= Cambodia =

Country in Southeast Asia

Kingdom of Cambodia ព្រះរាជាណាចក្រកម្ពុជា (Khmer) Preăh Riachianachăk Kămpŭchia
- Flag Royal Arms
- Motto: ជាតិ សាសនា ព្រះមហាក្សត្រ: Chiat, Sasna, Preăh Môhaksăt; "Nation, Religion, King"
- Anthem: នគររាជ: Nôkô Riach; "Song of the Royal Kingdom"
- Location of Cambodia (red) in Southeast Asia
- Capital and largest city: Phnom Penh; 11°34′10″N 104°55′16″E
- Official languages: Khmer
- Official script: Khmer
- Ethnic groups (2019/20): 95.4% Khmer; 2.4% Cham; 1.5% Chinese; 0.8% other
- Religion (2024): 96.5% Buddhism (official); 2.6% Islam; 0.3% Christianity; 0.5% other
- Demonym: Cambodian
- Government: Unitary parliamentary constitutional elective monarchy under a hereditary dictatorship
  - Monarch: Norodom Sihamoni
  - Prime Minister: Hun Manet
  - President of the Senate: Hun Sen
  - President of the National Assembly: Khuon Sodary
- Legislature: Parliament
  - Upper house: Senate
  - Lower house: National Assembly

Formation
  - Funan: 68–550
  - Chenla: 550–802
  - Khmer Empire: 802–1431
  - Middle period: 1431–1863
  - French protectorate: 11 August 1863
  - Independence from France: 9 November 1953
  - Khmer Republic: 9 October 1970
  - Democratic Kampuchea: 5 January 1976
  - People's Republic of Kampuchea: 8 January 1979
  - State of Cambodia: 30 April 1989
  - United Nations Administered Cambodia: 28 February 1992
  - Monarchy restored: 24 September 1993

Area
  - Total: 181,035 km^{2} (69,898 sq mi) (88th)
  - Water (%): 2.5

Population
  - 2026 estimate: ▲17,816,143 (72st)
  - Density: 94.4/km^{2} (244.5/sq mi)
- GDP (PPP): 2026 estimate
  - Total: ▲US$158.55 billion (89th)
  - Per capita: ▲US$9,046 (131st)
- GDP (nominal): 2026 estimate
  - Total: ▲US$53.06 billion (93rd)
  - Per capita: ▲US$3,027 (140th)
- Gini (2024): 23.6 low inequality
- HDI (2023): ▲0.606 medium (151st)
- Currency: Riel (៛) (KHR; de jure and de facto); United States dollar ($) (USD; de facto)
- Time zone: UTC+07:00 (ICT)
- Calling code: +855
- ISO 3166 code: KH
- Internet TLD: .kh

Cambodia, (Note: /kæmˈboʊdiə/) officially the Kingdom of Cambodia, (Note: Khmer: ព្រះរាជាណាចក្រកម្ពុជា, romanised: Preăh Riachianachăk Kămpŭchia [prĕəh riə.ciə.naː.cak kam.puʔ.ciə]) is a country in Mainland Southeast Asia. It is bordered by Thailand to the northwest, Laos to the north, and Vietnam to the east, and has a coastline along the Gulf of Thailand in the southwest. Cambodia spans an area of about 181,035 km^{2} (69,898 sq mi), dominated by a low-lying plain and the confluence of the Mekong river and Tonlé Sap, Southeast Asia's largest lake. It is dominated by a tropical climate. Cambodia has a population of about 17 million people, the majority of whom are ethnically Khmer. A majority of its population adhere to Buddhism, with Islam and Christianity having a minor presence. Its capital and most populous city is Phnom Penh, followed by Siem Reap and Battambang.

Cambodia has been inhabited for over 5000 years, with its earliest recorded mandala known as Funan. In 802 AD, Jayavarman II declared himself king, uniting the warring Khmer princes of Chenla under the name "Kambuja". Cambodia with this became the centre of power of the Khmer Empire. Over 600 years, the Khmer Empire facilitated the spread of first Hinduism and then Buddhism across Southeast Asia and undertook infrastructural projects throughout the region. In the 15th century, Cambodia saw a decline in power and territorial losses to its neighbours. In 1863, it became a French protectorate and later a part of French Indochina. During World War II, Cambodia was occupied by Japan. French rule was then restored until Cambodia secured independence in 1953. Spillover of the Vietnam War in the 1960s destabilised Cambodia and contributed to internal conflict. The civil war ended with the takeover of the Khmer Rouge regime, which carried out the Cambodian genocide from 1975 to 1979. A Vietnamese intervention and occupation deposed the Khmer Rouge, while insurgencies continued until 1999. By 1993 a United Nations peacekeeping mission had restored Cambodia's monarchy, and established a new democratic constitution with elections.

Cambodia is a constitutional monarchy and a de jure multi-party state, while the Cambodian People's Party (CPP) dominates the political system and rules the country as a de facto one-party state. The UN designates Cambodia as a least developed country, given the persistent socio-economic challenges. Agriculture remains its dominant economic sector, with growth in textiles, construction, garments, and tourism leading to increased foreign investment and international trade. Corruption, deforestation, human rights issues and organized crime have remained issues in Cambodia's post-conflict development.

== Etymology ==
The Kingdom of Cambodia is the official English name of the country. The English Cambodia is an anglicisation of the French Cambodge, which in turn is the French transliteration of the Khmer កម្ពុជា (Kămpŭchia, pronounced [kampuciə]). Kămpŭchia is the shortened alternative to the country's official name in Khmer ព្រះរាជាណាចក្រកម្ពុជា (Preăh Riachianachăk Kămpŭchia, pronounced [preah riəciənaːcak kampuciə]). The Khmer endonym កម្ពុជា Kămpŭchia is derived from the Sanskrit name Kambujadeśa, composed of Kambuja (lit. 'the sons of Kambu') and Deśa (lit. 'land of'), and refers to the legendary sage Kambu Swayambhuva from whom the Khmer kings claimed descent; the name Kambujadeśa literally means "the land of the sons of Kambu". The country was known as Camogia in Europe as early as 1524, as mentioned by Antonio Pigafetta in his work Relazione del primo viaggio intorno al mondo (1524–1525).

== History ==
=== Prehistory ===
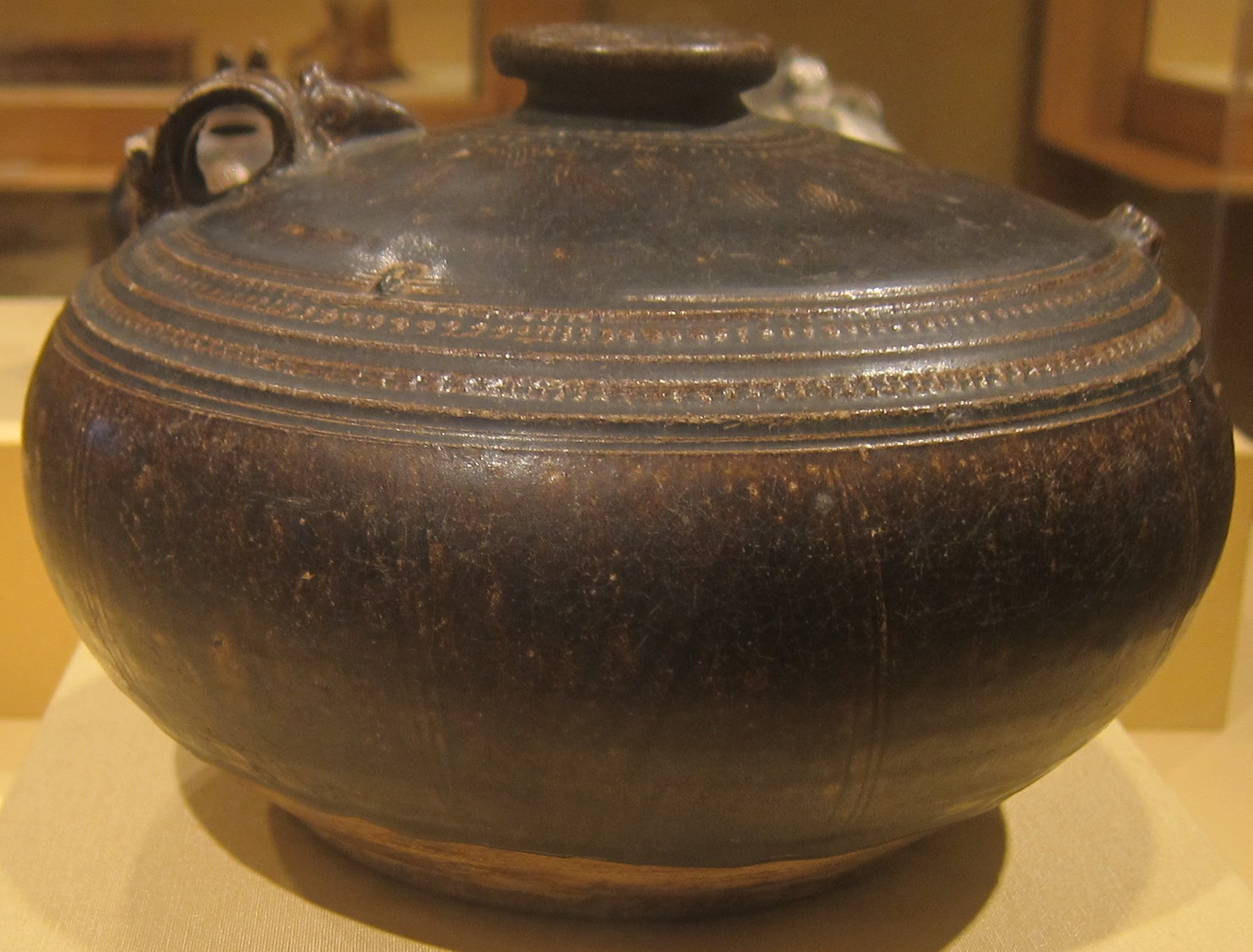
Glazed stoneware dating back to the 12th century

There exists evidence for a Pleistocene human occupation of what later is Cambodia, which includes quartz and quartzite pebble tools found in terraces along the Mekong River, in Stung Treng and Kratié provinces, and in Kampot province. Some archaeological evidence shows communities of hunter-gatherers inhabited the region during the Holocene: the most ancient archaeological discovery site in Cambodia is considered to be the cave of Laang Spean, which belongs to the Hoabinhian period. Excavations in its lower layers produced a series of radiocarbon dates around 6000 BC. Upper layers in the same site gave evidence of transition to Neolithic, containing the earliest dated earthenware ceramics in Cambodia.

Archaeological records for the period between the Holocene and Iron Age remain equally limited. An event in prehistory was the penetration of the first rice farmers from the north, which began in the third millennium BC. Prehistoric evidence are the "circular earthworks" discovered in the red soil near Memot and in the adjacent region of Vietnam in the latter 1950s. Their function and age are still debated, and some of them possibly date from the second millennium BC. Other prehistoric sites of somewhat uncertain date are Samrong Sen (not far from the ancient capital of Oudong), where the first investigations began in 1875, and Phum Snay, in the northern province of Banteay Meanchey.

Iron was worked by about 500 BC, with supporting evidence coming from the Khorat Plateau, in what later is Thailand. In Cambodia, some Iron Age settlements were found beneath Prasat Baksei Chamkrong and other Angkorian temples while circular earthworks were discovered at the site of Lovea kilometres north-west of Angkor. Burials testify to improvement of food availability and trade, and the existence of a social structure and labour organisation. Kinds of glass beads recovered from sites, such as the Phum Snay site in the northwest and the Prohear site in the southeast, suggest that there were two main trading networks at the time. The two networks were separated by time and space, which indicate that there was a shift from one network to the other at about the 2nd–4th century AD, probably due to changes in socio-political powers.

=== Pre-Angkorian, Angkorian, and Post-Angkor ===
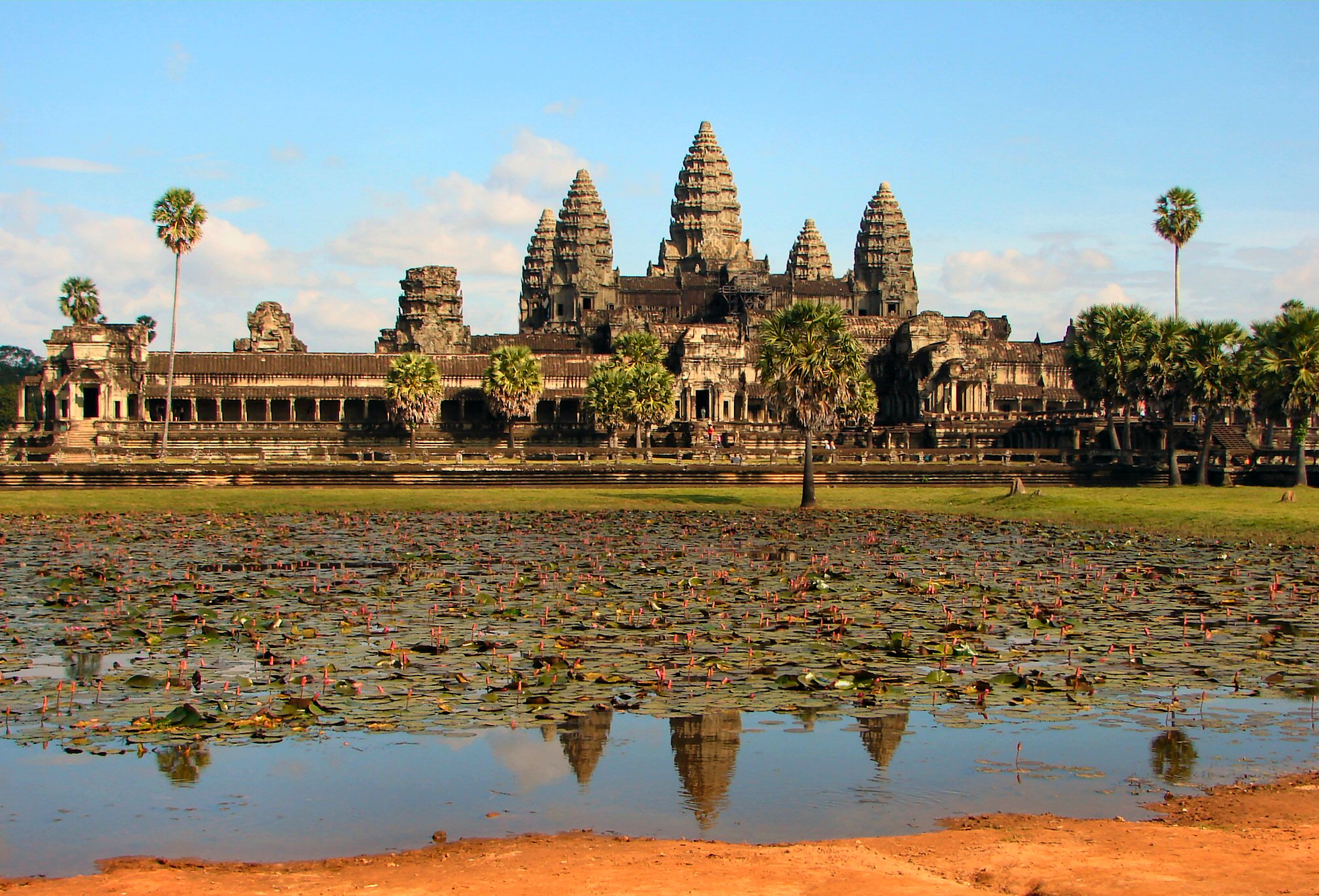
Angkor Wat

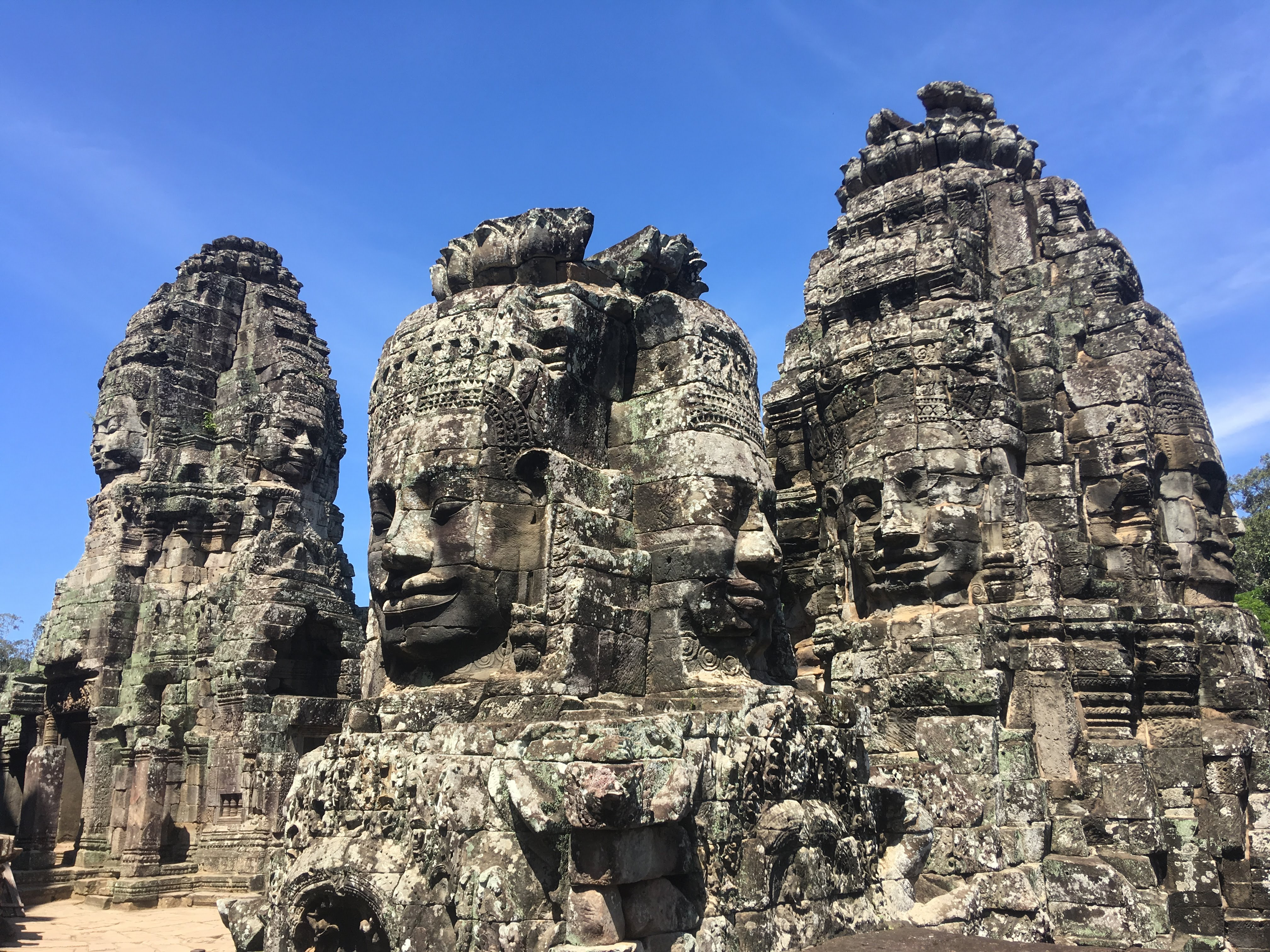
Faces of Bodhisattva Avalokiteshvara at Prasat Bayon

During the 3rd, 4th, and 5th centuries, the Indianised kingdoms of Funan and its successor, Chenla, coalesced in what later is Cambodia and southwestern Vietnam. For more than 2,000 years, what was to become Cambodia absorbed influences from India, passing them on to other Southeast Asian civilisations that later became Thailand and Laos.

The scholar George Cœdès refers to the 10th-century Baksei Chamkrong inscription, narrating the Cambodian dynastic legend in which the hermit Kambu Swayambhuva and the celestial nymph Mera unite and establish the Cambodian royal dynasty, first of whom were the Chenla rulers Srutavarman and his son Sreshthavarman. The Khmer Empire grew out of the remnants of Chenla, becoming firmly established in 802 when Jayavarman II (reigned c. 790 – c. 835) declared independence from Java and proclaimed himself a devaraja. Khmer kings and their followers instituted the cult of the God-king and began a series of conquests that formed an empire which flourished in the area from the 9th to the 15th centuries. During the rule of Jayavarman VIII the Angkor Empire was attacked by the Mongol army of Kublai Khan; the king was able to buy peace. Around the 13th century, Theravada missionaries from Sri Lanka reintroduced Theravada Buddhism to Southeast Asia, having previously sent missionaries in the 1190s. The religion spread and eventually displaced Hinduism and Mahayana Buddhism as the popular religion of Angkor, and officially became state religion in 1295 when Indravarman III took power.

The Khmer Empire was the largest Southeast Asian empire during the 12th century. Its centre of power was Angkor, where a series of capitals were constructed during the empire's zenith. In 2007, an international team of researchers using satellite photographs and other modern techniques concluded Angkor to have been the largest pre-industrial city in the world with an urban sprawl of 2,980 km^{2} (1,151 sq mi). The city could have supported a population of up to 1 million people.

After a series of wars with neighbouring kingdoms, Angkor was sacked by the Ayutthaya Kingdom and abandoned in 1432 because of ecological failure and infrastructure breakdown. The kingdom's capital was eventually moved to Longvek, which prospered as an integral part of the 16th century Asian maritime trade network. The rivalry with the Ayutthaya Kingdom resulted in several conflicts, including the Siamese conquest of Longvek in 1594.

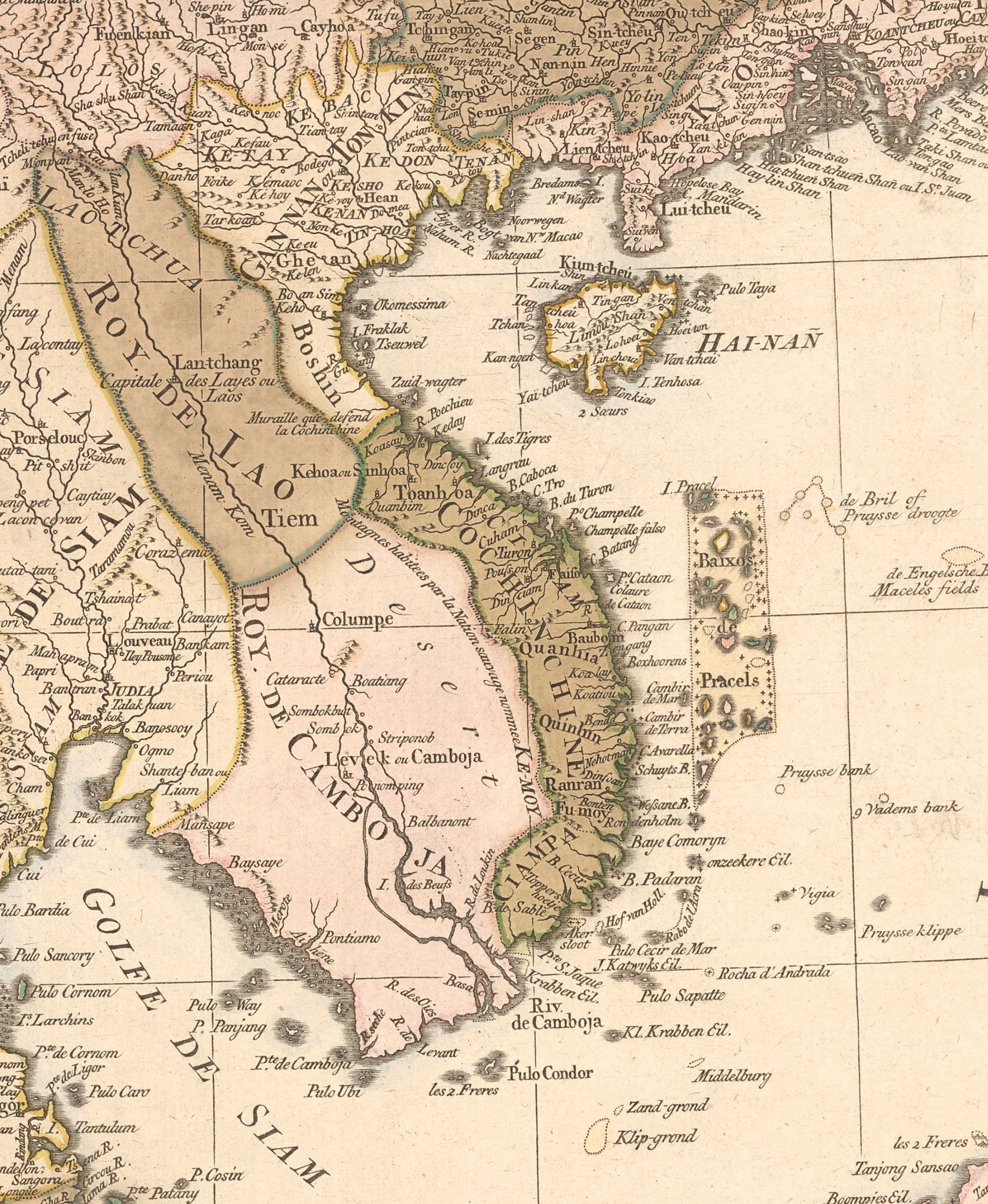
A map of Indochina in 1760

The hill tribe people were "hunted incessantly and carried off as slaves by the Siamese (Thai), the Annamites (Vietnamese), and the Cambodians".

Formerly part of the Khmer Empire, the Mekong Delta came under Vietnamese control in 1698, with King Chey Chettha II having granted the Vietnamese permission to settle in the area decades before.

Siamese and Vietnamese dominance intensified during the 17th and 18th century, provoking displacements of the seat of power as the Khmer monarch's authority decreased to the state of a vassal. Both powers alternately demanded subservience and tribute from the Cambodian court.

=== French colonisation ===
In 1863, King Norodom signed a treaty of protection with France. The protectorate of France period lasted until 1953, with an interruption while the kingdom was occupied by the Japanese empire from 1941 to 1945 and simultaneously existing as the puppet state of Kingdom of Kampuchea in 1945. Between 1874 and 1962, the total population increased from about 946,000 to 5.7 million. After King Norodom's death in 1904, France manipulated the choice of king and Sisowath, Norodom's brother, was placed on the throne. The throne became vacant in 1941 with the death of Monivong, Sisowath's son, and France passed over Monivong's son, Monireth, feeling he was too independently minded. Instead, Norodom Sihanouk, a maternal grandson of King Sisowath was enthroned. The French thought young Sihanouk would be easy to control. Under the reign of King Norodom Sihanouk, Cambodia gained independence from France on 9 November 1953.

=== Kingdom (1953–1970) ===
In 1955, Sihanouk abdicated in favour of his father to participate in politics and was elected Prime Minister. Upon his father's death in 1960, Sihanouk again became head of state, taking the title of prince. As the Vietnam War progressed, Sihanouk adopted an official policy of neutrality in the Cold War. He allowed the Vietnamese communists to use Cambodia as a sanctuary and a supply route for their arms and other aid to their armed forces fighting in South Vietnam. In December 1967, Washington Post journalist Stanley Karnow was told by Sihanouk that if the U.S. wanted to bomb the Vietnamese communist sanctuaries, he would not object unless Cambodians were killed.

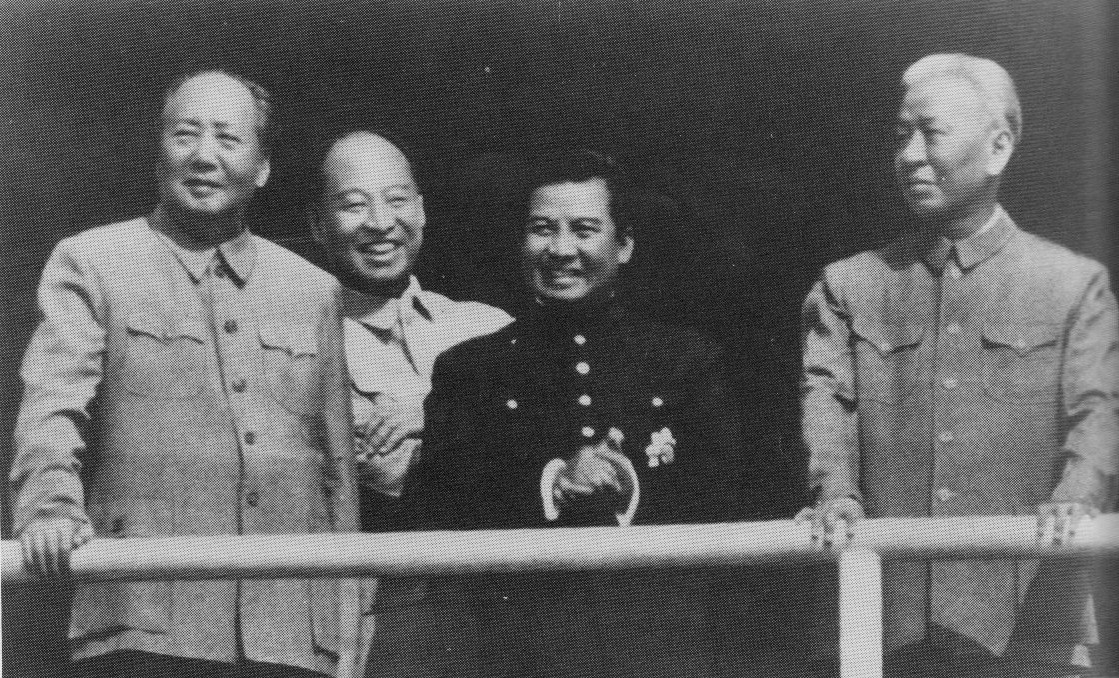
Norodom Sihanouk and Mao Zedong in 1956

The same message was conveyed to U.S. president Lyndon B. Johnson emissary Chester Bowles in January 1968. In public Sihanouk refuted the right of the U.S. to use air strikes in Cambodia, and on 26 March he said "these criminal attacks must immediately and definitively stop". On 28 March a press conference was held and Sihanouk appealed to the international media: "I appeal to you to publicise abroad this very clear stand of Cambodia – that is, I will, in any case, oppose all bombings on Cambodian territory under whatever pretext." Nevertheless, the bombing continued.

=== Khmer Republic (1970–1975) ===
While visiting Beijing in 1970 Sihanouk was ousted by a military coup led by Prime Minister Lon Nol and Prince Sisowath Sirik Matak. Once the coup was completed, the new regime, which demanded that the Vietnamese communists leave Cambodia, gained the political support of the United States. The North Vietnamese and Viet Cong forces launched armed attacks on the new government to retain their sanctuaries and supply lines from North Vietnam. The king urged his followers to help in overthrowing this government, hastening the onset of civil war.

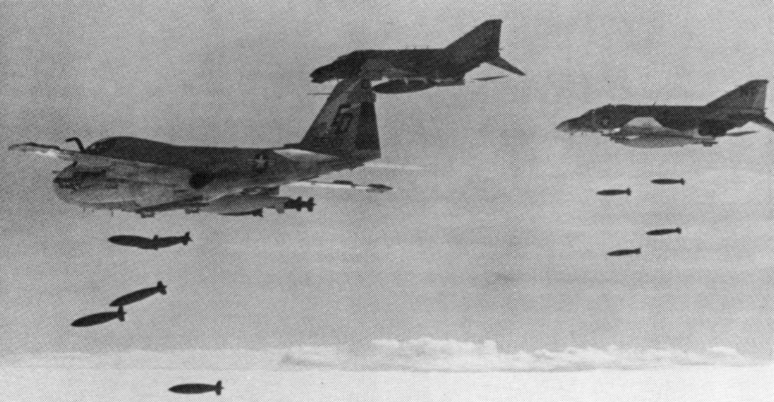
Tens of thousands of people were killed during the US bombing of Cambodia between 1970 and 1973.

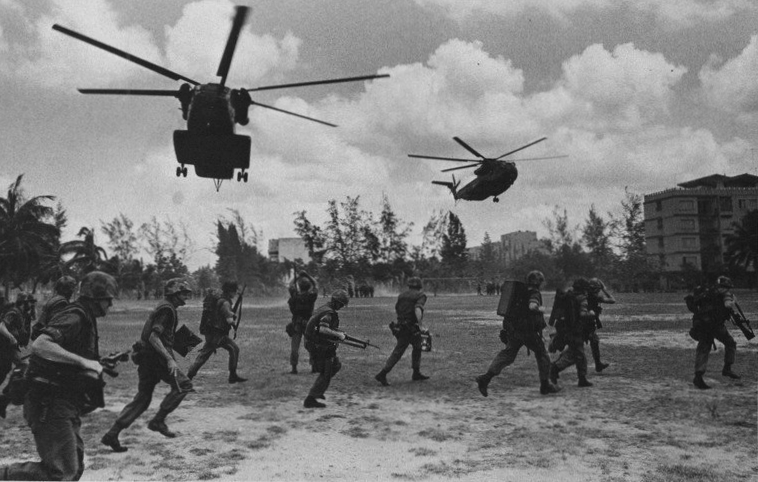
Operation Eagle Pull

Khmer Rouge rebels began using the king to gain support. From 1970 until 1972, the Cambodian conflict was largely between the government and army of Cambodia, and the armed forces of North Vietnam. As they gained control of Cambodian territory, the Vietnamese communists imposed a new political infrastructure, which was eventually dominated by the Cambodian communists now referred to as the Khmer Rouge.

Documents uncovered from the Soviet archives after 1991 reveal that the North Vietnamese attempt to overrun Cambodia in 1970 was launched at the explicit request of the Khmer Rouge and negotiated by then second-in-command Nuon Chea. North Vietnamese Army (NVA) units overran Cambodian army positions while the Communist Party of Kampuchea (CPK) expanded their attacks on lines of communication. In response to the North Vietnamese invasion, U.S. President Richard Nixon announced that U.S. and South Vietnamese ground forces had entered Cambodia in a campaign aimed at destroying NVA base areas in Cambodia.

On New Year's Day 1975, Communist troops launched an offensive which, in 117 days, led to the collapse of the Khmer Republic. Simultaneous attacks around the perimeter of Phnom Penh pinned down Republican forces, while other CPK units overran fire bases controlling the lower Mekong resupply route. A U.S.-funded airlift of ammunition and rice ended when Congress refused additional aid for Cambodia. The Lon Nol government in Phnom Penh surrendered on 17 April 1975, 5 days after the U.S. mission evacuated Cambodia.

=== Khmer Rouge regime (1975–1979) ===
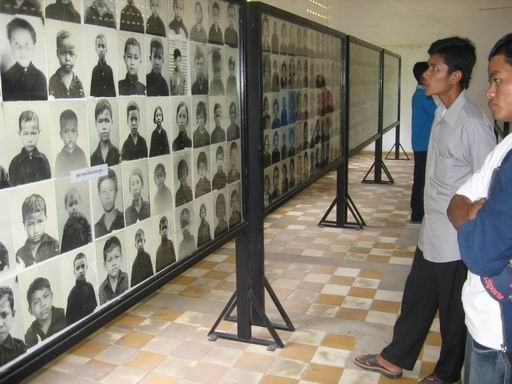
Rooms of the Tuol Sleng Genocide Museum contain thousands of photos taken by the Khmer Rouge of their victims.

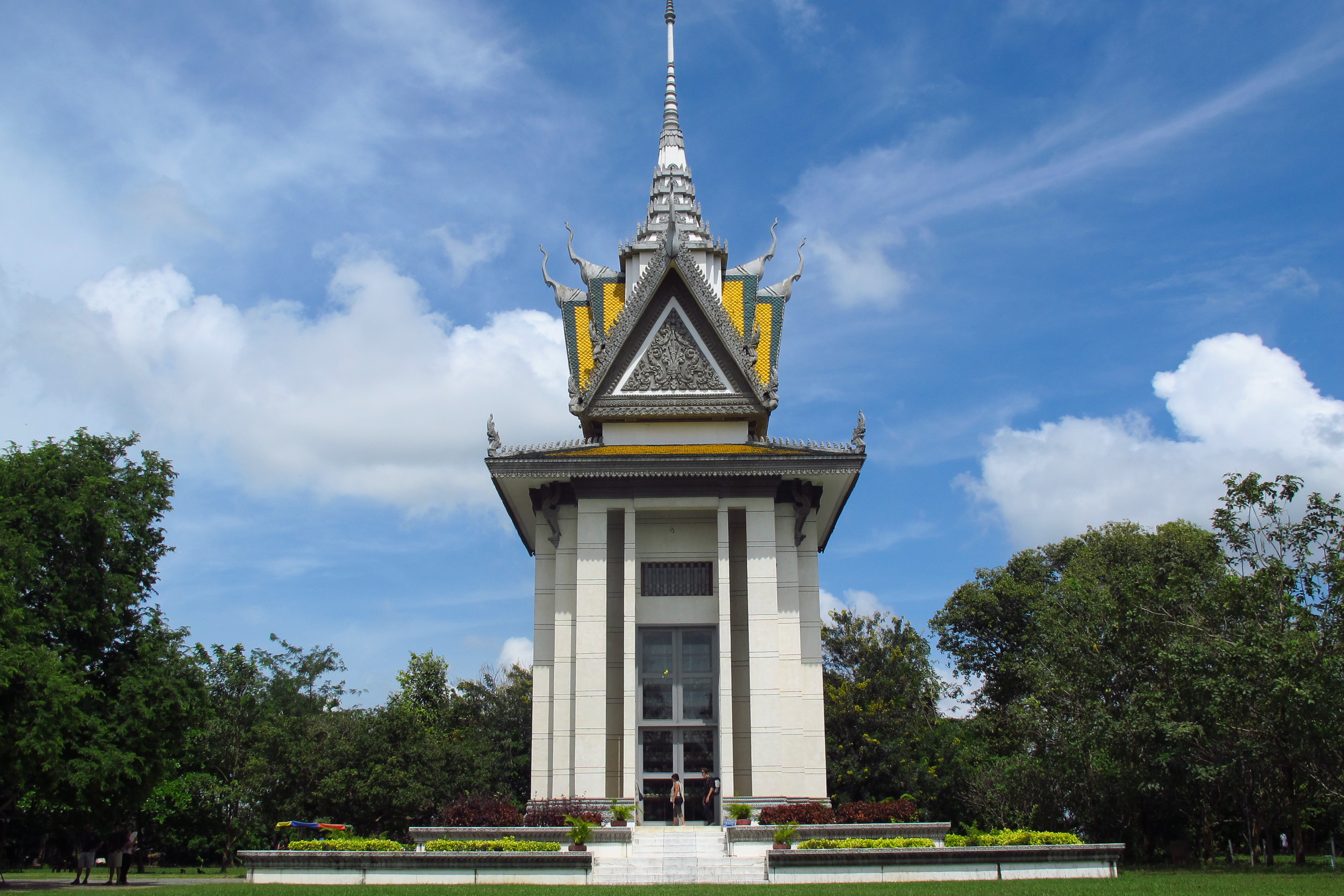
Choeung Ek, a known site of mass grave for genocide victims during the Khmer Rouge era

Estimates as to how many people were killed by the Khmer Rouge regime range from approximately 1 to 3 million; a cited figure is 2 million (about a quarter of the population). This era gave rise to the term Killing Fields, and the prison Tuol Sleng became known for its history of mass killing. Hundreds of thousands fled across the border into neighbouring Thailand.

While the regime targeted ethnic minority groups at disproportionately higher rates relative to their population size, the absolute majority of victims were ethnic Khmer. The Cham Muslims underwent purges with as much as half of their population exterminated, while forced repatriation in 1970 and deaths during the regime reduced the Vietnamese population in Cambodia from between 250,000 and 300,000 in 1969 to a reported 56,000 in 1984. Khmer Rouge leader Pol Pot was determined to keep his power and disenfranchise any potential threats, escalating violence against the general population. Professionals, such as doctors, lawyers, and teachers, were heavily targeted. According to Robert D. Kaplan, "eyeglasses were as deadly as the yellow star" as they were seen as a sign of intellectualism. By 1978, the entire legal system was eradicated by the Khmer Rouge regime. Judges and lawyers were executed after being deemed "class enemies", and only 6–12 legal professionals survived and remained in the country. Religious institutions were also targeted, resulting in the destruction of 95% of Cambodia's Buddhist temples alongside vast amounts of Khmer architecture.

=== Vietnamese occupation and transition (1979–1992) ===
In November 1978, Vietnamese troops invaded Cambodia in response to border raids by the Khmer Rouge and conquered it. The People's Republic of Kampuchea (PRK) was established as a pro-Soviet state led by the Kampuchean People's Revolutionary Party, a party created by the Vietnamese in 1951, and led by a group of Khmer Rouge who had fled Cambodia to avoid being purged by Pol Pot and Ta Mok. It was fully beholden to the occupying Vietnamese army and under the direction of the Vietnamese ambassador to Phnom Penh. Its arms came from Vietnam and the Soviet Union.

In opposition to the newly created state, a government-in-exile referred to as the Coalition Government of Democratic Kampuchea (CGDK) was formed in 1981 from three factions. This consisted of the Khmer Rouge, a royalist faction led by Sihanouk, and the Khmer People's National Liberation Front. Its credentials were recognised by the United Nations. The Khmer Rouge representative to the UN, Thiounn Prasith, was retained, and he had to work in consultation with representatives of the noncommunist Cambodian parties. The refusal of Vietnam to withdraw from Cambodia led to economic sanctions against it by the US.

Memorial of King Norodom Sihanouk

Peace efforts began in Paris in 1989 under the State of Kampuchea, culminating two years later in October 1991 in a Paris Comprehensive Peace Settlement. The UN was given a mandate to enforce a ceasefire and deal with refugees and disarmament known as the United Nations Transitional Authority in Cambodia (UNTAC).

=== Kingdom (1993–) ===
In 1993, the monarchy was restored with Norodom Sihanouk reinstated as King, and the first post-war election was coordinated by UNTAC. The election was won by FUNCINPEC led by Sihanouk's son Ranariddh in a hung parliament. A power-sharing agreement was agreed with Ranariddh and Hun Sen of the Cambodian People's Party both simultaneously being co-PMs after the CPP threatened to secede part of the country if power was fully transferred to FUNCINPEC. The stability established following the conflict was shaken in 1997 by a coup d'état led by the co-prime minister Hun Sen, who ousted Ranariddh and other parties represented in the government and consolidated power for CPP. After its government was able to stabilise under Sen, Cambodia was accepted into the Association of Southeast Asian Nations (ASEAN) on 30 April 1999. Norodom Sihamoni was crowned Cambodia's king in 2004 after his father Sihanouk's abdication.

During the 1990s and 2000s, reconstruction efforts progressed which led to some political stability through a multiparty democracy under a constitutional monarchy, although Sen's rule has been marred by human rights abuses and corruption. The Cambodian economy grew rapidly in the 2000s and 2010s, and it received considerable investment and infrastructure development support from China as part of its Belt and Road Initiative.

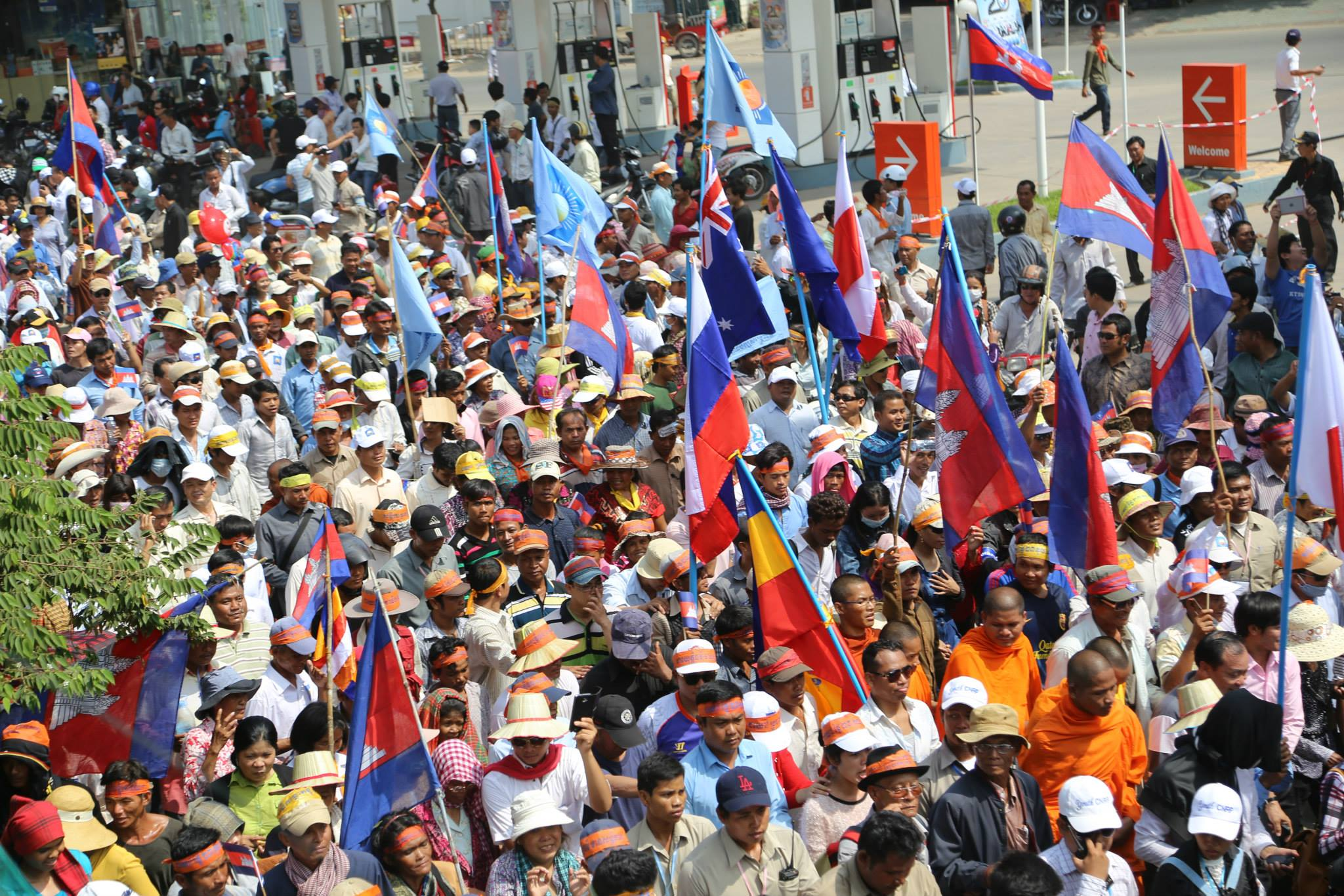
Anti-government protests supporting opposition party CNRP followed the 2013 general election.

A UN-backed war crimes tribunal, the Khmer Rouge Tribunal sought out to investigate crimes committed during the Democratic Kampuchea period and prosecute its leaders. Hun Sen has opposed extensive trials or investigations of former Khmer Rouge officials. In July 2010, Kang Kek Iew was the first Khmer Rouge member found guilty of war crimes and crimes against humanity in his role as the former commandant of the S-21 extermination camp and was sentenced to life in prison.

After the 2013 Cambodian general election, allegations of voter fraud from opposition party Cambodia National Rescue Party led to widespread anti-government protests that continued into the following year. The protests ended after a crackdown by government forces. The Cambodia National Rescue Party was dissolved ahead of the 2018 Cambodian general election and the ruling Cambodian People's Party also enacted tighter curbs on mass media. The CPP won every seat in the National Assembly without major opposition, effectively solidifying de facto one-party rule in the country.

Prime Minister Hun Sen was one of the world's longest-serving leaders. He had been accused of crackdowns on opponents and critics. In December 2021, Hun Sen announced his support for his son Hun Manet to succeed him after the next general election in 2023. A July 2023 Human Rights Watch report showed election fraud and vote tampering in the June 2022 commune elections. In the July 2023 election, the ruling Cambodian People's Party (CPP) won by a landslide in an election, after the disqualification of a Cambodia's opposition, Candlelight Party. On 22 August 2023, Hun Manet was sworn in as the new Cambodian PM.

== Geography ==
Geographic map of Cambodia

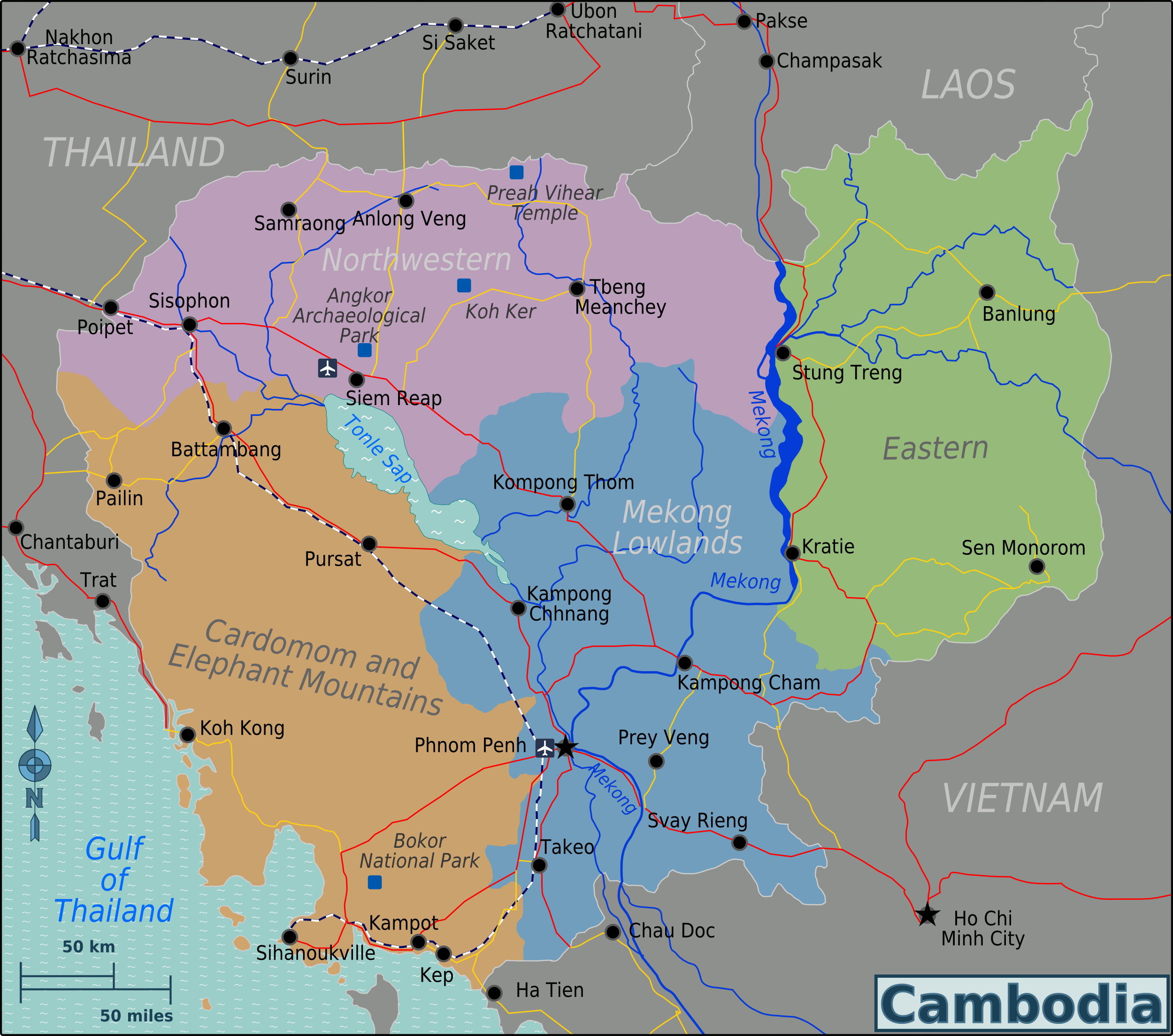
Regional map of Cambodia

Cambodia has an area of 181,035 km^{2} (69,898 sq mi) and lies entirely within the tropics, between latitudes 10° and 15°N, and longitudes 102° and 108°E. It borders Thailand to the north and west, Laos to the northeast, and Vietnam to the east and southeast. It has a 443 km (275 mi) coastline along the Gulf of Thailand.

Cambodia's landscape is characterised by a low-lying central plain that is surrounded by uplands and low mountains and includes the Tonle Sap (Great Lake) and the upper reaches of the Mekong River delta. Extending outward from this central region are transitional plains, thinly forested and rising to elevations of about 200 m (650 ft) above sea level. In Cambodia forest cover is around 46% of the total land area, equivalent to 8,068,370 hectares (ha) of forest in 2020, down from 11,004,790 hectares (ha) in 1990. In 2020, naturally regenerating forest covered 7,464,400 ha, and planted forest covered 603,970 ha. Of the naturally regenerating forest 4% was reported to be primary forest (consisting of native tree species with no clearly visible indications of human activity). For the year 2015, 100% of the forest area was reported to be under public ownership.

To the north the Cambodian plain abuts a sandstone escarpment, which forms a southward-facing cliff stretching more than 320 km (200 mi) from west to east and rising abruptly above the plain to heights of 180–550 m (600–1,800 ft). This cliff marks the southern limit of the Dângrêk Mountains.

Flowing south through Cambodia's eastern regions is the Mekong River. East of the Mekong the transitional plains gradually merge with the eastern highlands, a region of forested mountains and high plateaus that extend into Laos and Vietnam. In southwestern Cambodia two distinct upland blocks, the Krâvanh Mountains and the Dâmrei Mountains, form another highland region that covers most of the land area between the Tonle Sap and the Gulf of Thailand.

In this largely uninhabited area, Phnom Aural, Cambodia's highest peak rises to an elevation of 1,813 m (5,949 ft). The southern coastal region adjoining the Gulf of Thailand is a lowland strip, more heavily wooded and more sparsely populated, which is isolated from the central plain by the southwestern highlands.

The most distinctive geographical feature is the inundations of the Tonle Sap, measuring about 2,590 km^{2} (1,000 sq mi) during the dry season and expanding to about 24,605 km^{2} (9,500 sq mi) during the rainy season. This plain, which is devoted to wet rice cultivation, is the heartland of Cambodia. Most of this area has been designated as a biosphere reserve.

=== Climate ===
Köppen climate classification map of Cambodia

Cambodia's climate, like that of the rest of Southeast Asia, is dominated by monsoons, which are known as tropical wet and dry because of the distinctly marked seasonal differences.

Cambodia has a temperature range from 21 to 35 °C (70 to 95 °F) and experiences tropical monsoons. Southwest monsoons blow inland bringing moisture-laden winds from the Gulf of Thailand and Indian Ocean from May to October. The northeast monsoon ushers in the dry season, which lasts from November to April. The country experiences the heaviest precipitation from September to October with the driest period occurring from January to February.

According to the International Development Research Centre and The United Nations, Cambodia is considered Southeast Asia's most vulnerable country to the effects of climate change, alongside the Philippines. Nearly all provinces in Cambodia are affected by climate change. Rural coastal populations are particularly at risk. Shortages of clean water, extreme flooding, mudslides, higher sea levels and potentially destructive storms are of particular concern, according to the Cambodia Climate Change Alliance. Climate change has also had an impact on water levels, ecology and productivity of the Tonlé Sap in years, affecting the food security and agriculture of a proportion of Cambodia's population.

Cambodia has two distinct seasons. The rainy season, which runs from May to October, can see temperatures drop to 22 °C (72 °F) and is generally accompanied with high humidity. The dry season lasts from November to April when temperatures can rise up to 40 °C (104 °F) around April. Disastrous flooding occurred in 2001 and again in 2002, with some degree of flooding almost every year. Severe flooding also affected 17 provinces in Cambodia during the 2020 Pacific typhoon season.

=== Biodiversity and conservation ===
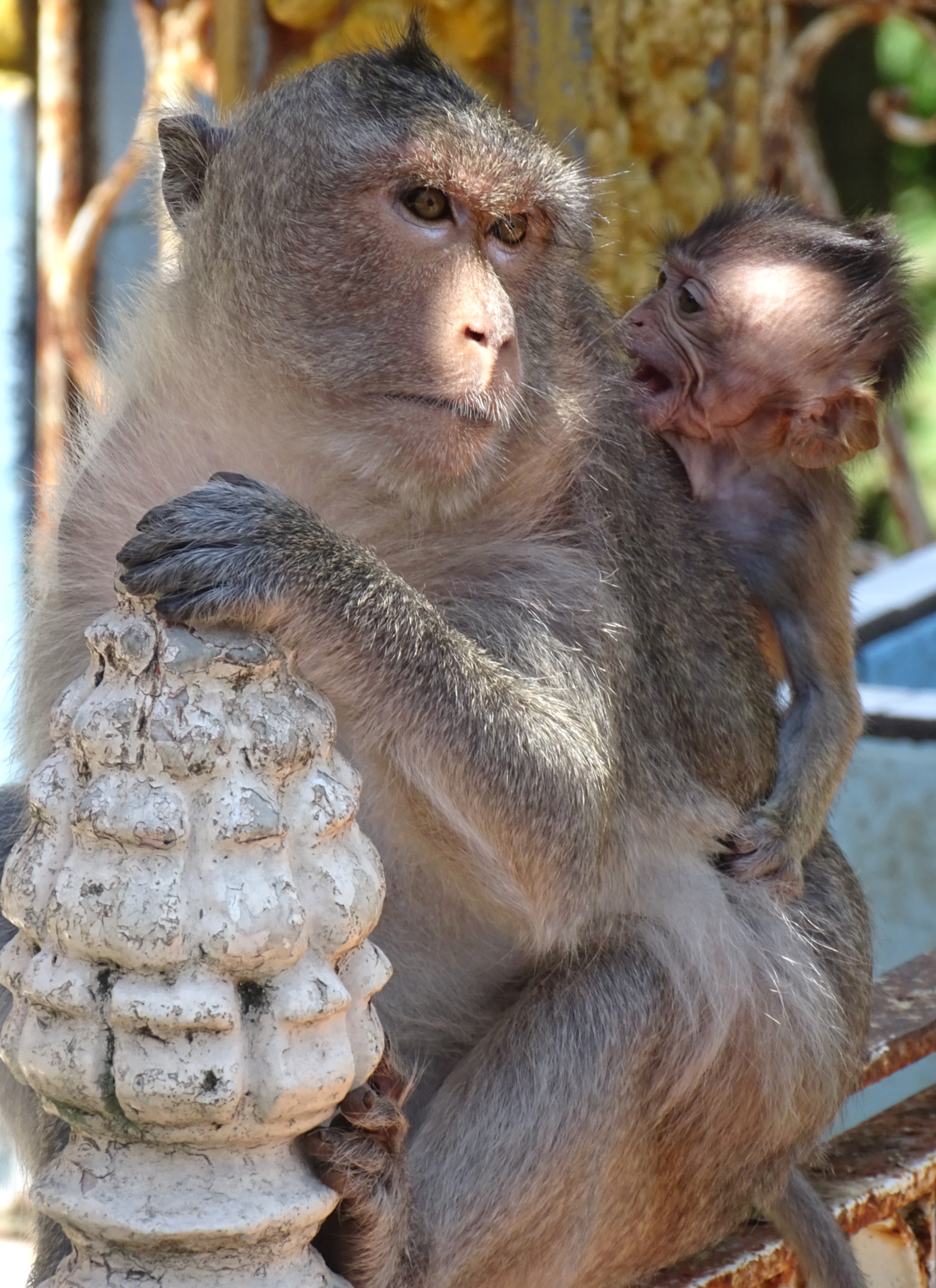
Macaques at Phnom Pros, Kampong Cham Province

Cambodia's biodiversity is largely founded on its seasonal tropical forests, containing some 180 recorded tree species, and riparian ecosystems. There are 212 mammal species, 536 bird species, 240 reptile species, 850 freshwater fish species (Tonle Sap Lake area), and 435 marine fish species recorded by science. Most of this biodiversity is contained around the Tonle Sap Lake and the surrounding biosphere.

The Tonle Sap Biosphere Reserve is a reserve surrounding the Tonle Sap lake. It encompasses the lake and nine provinces: Kampong Thom, Siem Reap, Battambang, Pursat, Kampong Chhnang, Banteay Meanchey, Pailin, Oddar Meanchey and Preah Vihear. In 1997, it was successfully nominated as a UNESCO Biosphere Reserve.

The Worldwide Fund for Nature recognises six distinct terrestrial ecoregions in Cambodia – the Cardamom Mountains rain forests, Central Indochina dry forest, Southeast Indochina dry evergreen forest, Southern Annamite Range tropical forest, Tonle Sap freshwater swamp forest, and Tonle Sap-Mekong peat swamp forest.

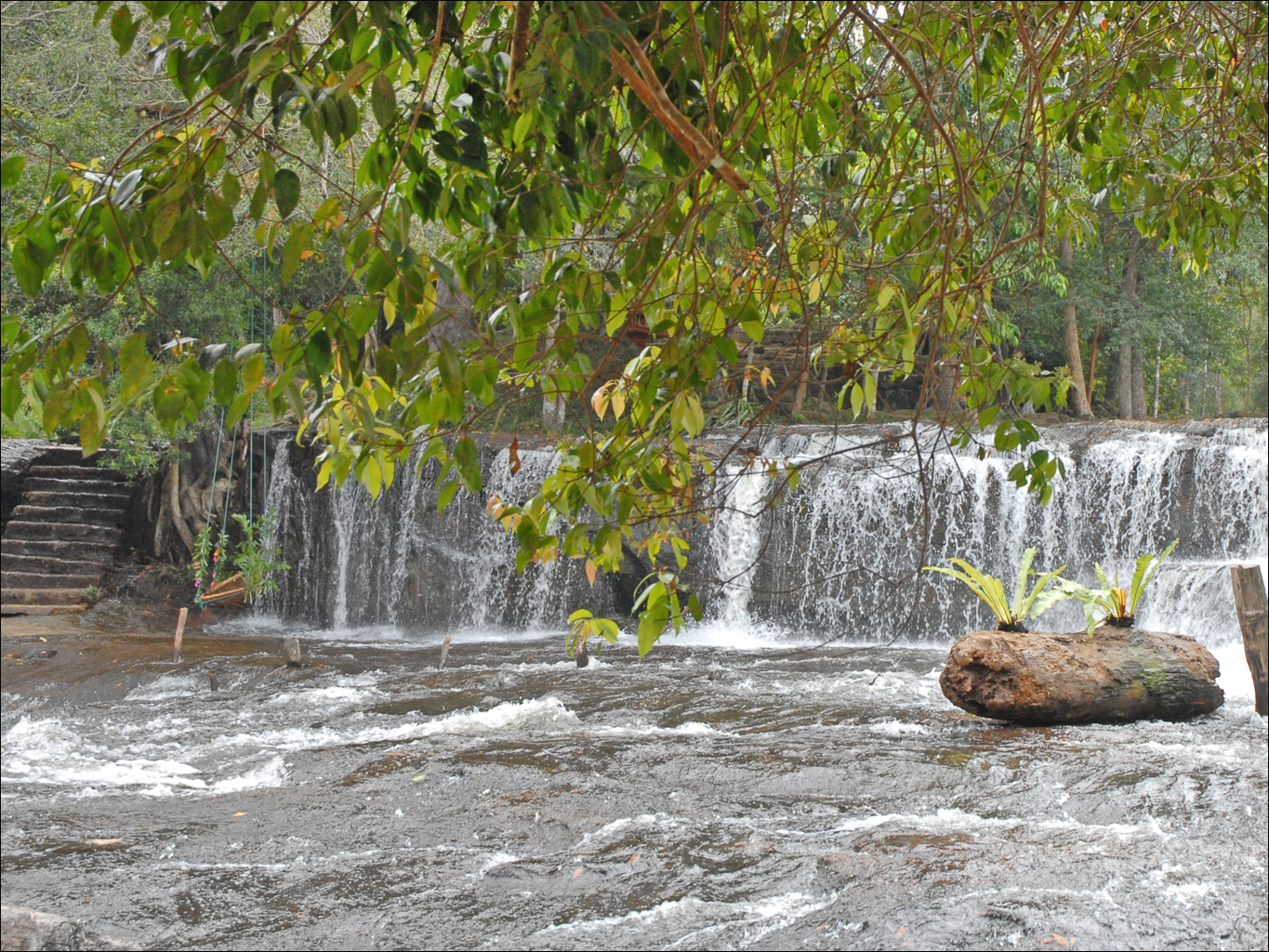
Waterfall at Phnom Kulen

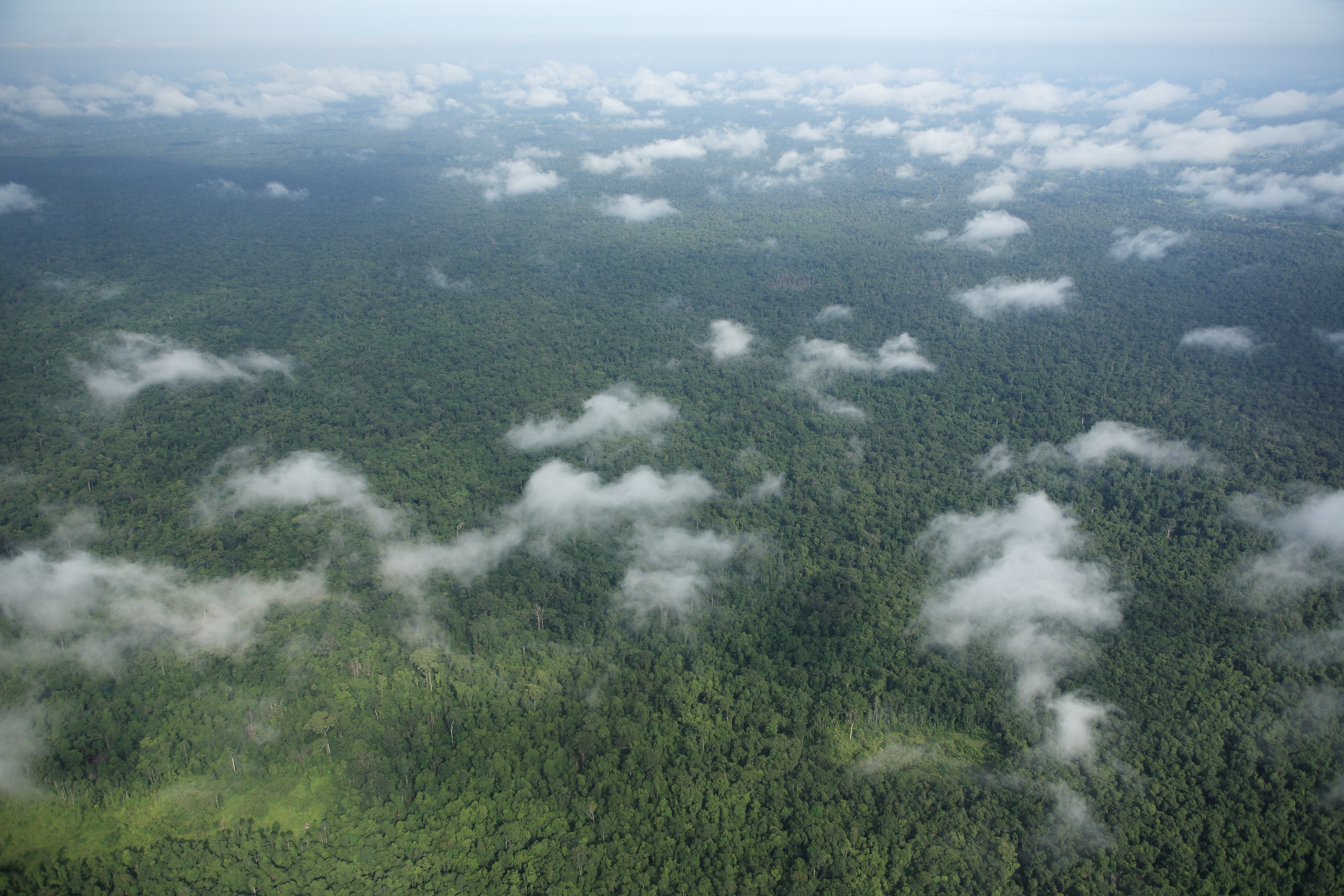
Prey Lang Forest

The rate of deforestation in Cambodia is “one of the highest in the world and it is often perceived as the most destructive, singular environmental issue” in the country. Cambodia's primary forest cover fell from over 70% in 1969 to just 3.1% in 2007. Since 2007, less than 3,220 km^{2} (1,243 sq mi) of primary forest remain with the result that the future sustainability of the forest reserves of Cambodia is under severe threat. In 2010–2015, the annual rate of deforestation was 1.3%. The environmental degradation also includes national parks and wildlife sanctuaries and endangered and endemic species are threatened with extinction due to loss of habitats. Reasons for the deforestation in Cambodia range from opportunistic illegal loggings to clearings from construction projects and agricultural activities. The deforestation involves the local population, Cambodian businesses and authorities, and transnational corporations from all over the world.

Plans for hydroelectric development in the Greater Mekong Subregion, by Laos in particular, pose a "real danger to the food supply of Vietnam and Cambodia. Upstream dams will imperil the fish stocks that provide the vast majority of Cambodia's protein and could also denude the Mekong River of the silt Vietnam needs for its rice basket." The rich fisheries of Tonle Sap, the largest freshwater lake in Southeast Asia, largely supply the country's protein. The lake all but disappears in the dry season and then expands as water flow from the Mekong backs up when the rains come. "Those fish are so important for their livelihoods, both economically and nutritionally", said Gordon Holtgrieve, a professor at the University of Washington; he points out that none of the dams that are either built or being built on the Mekong river "are pointing at good outcomes for the fisheries".

In the 2010s, the Cambodian government and educational system has increased its involvement and co-operation with national and international environmental groups. A new National Environmental Strategy and Action Plan (NESAP) for Cambodia is to be implemented from 2016 to 2023 and contains new ideas for how to incite a green and environmentally sustainable growth for the country.

=== Administrative divisions ===
The autonomous municipality (reach thani) and provinces (khaet) of Cambodia are first-level administrative divisions. Cambodia is divided into 25 provinces including the autonomous municipality.

Municipalities and districts are the second-level administrative divisions of Cambodia. The provinces are subdivided into 159 districts and 26 municipalities. The districts and municipalities in turn are further divided into communes (khum) and quarters (sangkat).

| Number | Province | Capital | Area (km^{2}) | Population (2024) |
|---|---|---|---|---|
| 1 | Banteay Meanchey | Serei Saophoan | 6,679 | 898,484 |
| 2 | Battambang | Battambang | 11,702 | 1,132,017 |
| 3 | Kampong Cham | Kampong Cham | 4,549 | 1,062,914 |
| 4 | Kampong Chhnang | Kampong Chhnang | 5,521 | 604,895 |
| 5 | Kampong Speu | Chbar Mon | 7,017 | 924,175 |
| 6 | Kampong Thom | Stung Saen | 13,814 | 807,254 |
| 7 | Kampot | Kampot | 4,873 | 682,987 |
| 8 | Kandal | Ta Khmau | 3,179 | 1,352,198 |
| 9 | Kep | Kep | 336 | 48,772 |
| 10 | Koh Kong | Khemarak Phoumin | 10,090 | 140,962 |
| 11 | Kratié | Kratié | 11,094 | 441,078 |
| 12 | Mondulkiri | Senmonorom | 14,288 | 93,657 |
| 13 | Oddar Meanchey | Samraong | 6,158 | 267,703 |
| 14 | Pailin | Pailin | 803 | 79,445 |
| 15 | Phnom Penh | Phnom Penh | 679 | 2,352,851 |
| 16 | Preah Sihanouk | Preah Sihanouk | 1,938 | 234,702 |
| 17 | Preah Vihear | Preah Vihear | 13,788 | 249,973 |
| 18 | Pursat | Pursat | 12,692 | 516,072 |
| 19 | Prey Veng | Prey Veng | 4,883 | 1,277,867 |
| 20 | Ratanakiri | Banlung | 10,782 | 235,852 |
| 21 | Siem Reap | Siem Reap | 10,299 | 1,099,825 |
| 22 | Stung Treng | Stung Treng | 11,092 | 176,488 |
| 23 | Svay Rieng | Svay Rieng | 2,966 | 613,159 |
| 24 | Takéo | Doun Kaev | 3,563 | 1,097,243 |
| 25 | Tboung Khmom | Suong | 5,250 | 889,970 |

== Politics ==
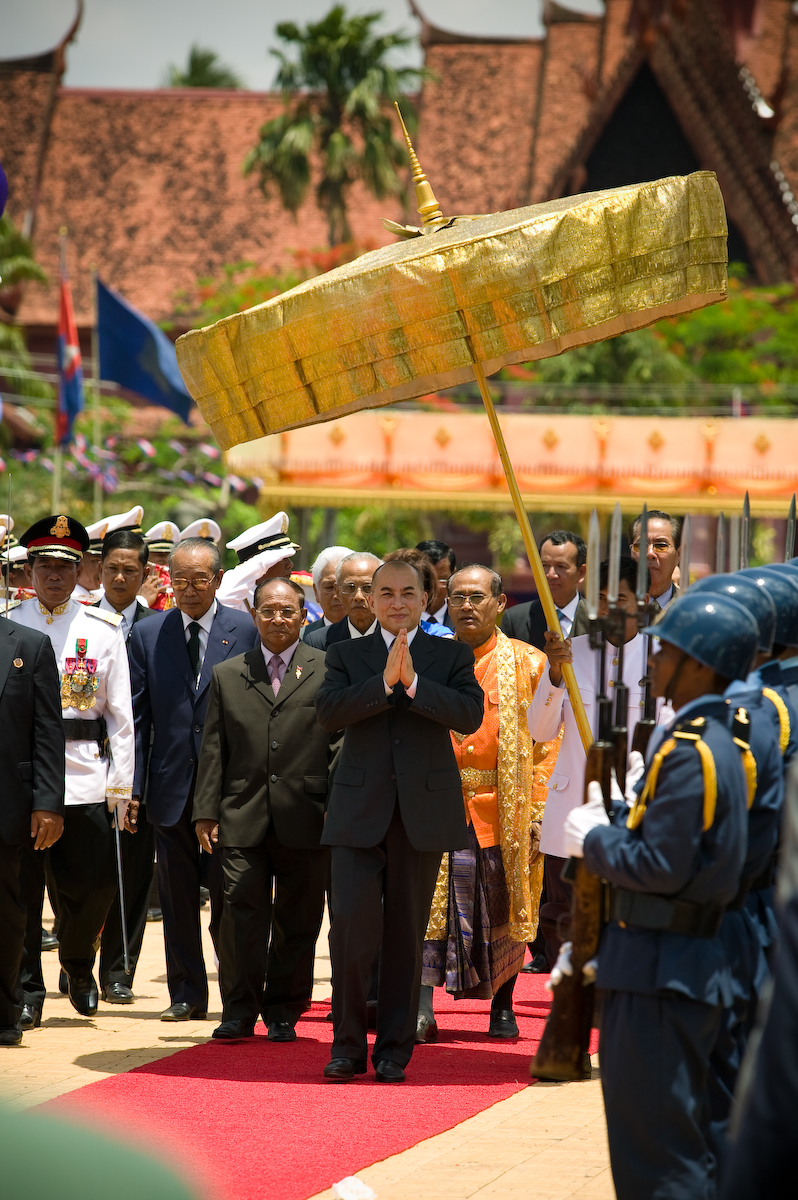
Norodom Sihamoni, King of Cambodia

Cambodia is a constitutional monarchy with a unitary structure and a parliamentary form of government. The king is officially the head of state and is the symbol of unity and "perpetuity" of the nation, as defined by Cambodia's constitution. Legislative powers are shared by the executive and the bicameral Parliament of Cambodia (សភាតំណាងរាស្ត្រ, sâphéa tâmnang réastrâ), which consists of a lower house, the National Assembly (រដ្ឋសភា, rôdthâsâphéa) and an upper house, the Senate (ព្រឹទ្ធសភា, prœ̆tthôsâphéa). Members of the 125-seat National Assembly are elected through a system of proportional representation and serve for a maximum term of five years. The Senate has 62 seats, two of which are appointed by the king and two others by the National Assembly, and the rest are elected by the commune councillors from the 24 provinces of Cambodia. Senators serve six-year terms.

Officially a multiparty democracy, in reality, "the country remain[ed] a one-party state dominated by the Cambodian People's Party and Prime Minister Hun Sen, a recast Khmer Rouge official in power since 1985. The open doors to new investment during his reign have yielded the most access to a coterie of cronies of his and his wife, Bun Rany", according to Megha Bahree, a writer on Forbes. Cambodia's government has been described by Human Rights Watch's Southeast Asian director, David Roberts, as a "relatively authoritarian coalition via a superficial democracy".

Prime Minister Hun Sen vowed to rule until he turned 74. His government was accused of ignoring human rights and suppressing political dissent. The 2013 election results were disputed by the opposition, leading to demonstrations in the capital. Demonstrators were injured and killed in Phnom Penh where a reported 20,000 protesters gathered, with some clashing with riot police. From a farming background, Hun Sen was 33 when he took power in 1985, and was by some considered a long-ruling dictator. Hun Sen was succeeded by his son Hun Manet as prime minister in August 2023 following an election that was deemed by independent and foreign media and politicians to be neither free nor fair. Hun Sen remains the de facto ruler of Cambodia through his continued leadership of the Cambodian People's Party. Following the 2024 Senate election, Hun Sen became president of the Senate, a role which gives him the power to sign off on laws in the King's absence.

Since the 2017 crackdowns on political dissent and free press, Cambodia has been described as a de facto one-party state.

On 14 March 2018, the UN expert on the human rights situation in Cambodia "expressed serious concerns about restrictions on the media, freedom of expression and political participation ahead of a national election in July". Some critics of the government have been arrested for allegedly spreading fake news about the COVID-19 pandemic in Cambodia.

=== Foreign relations ===
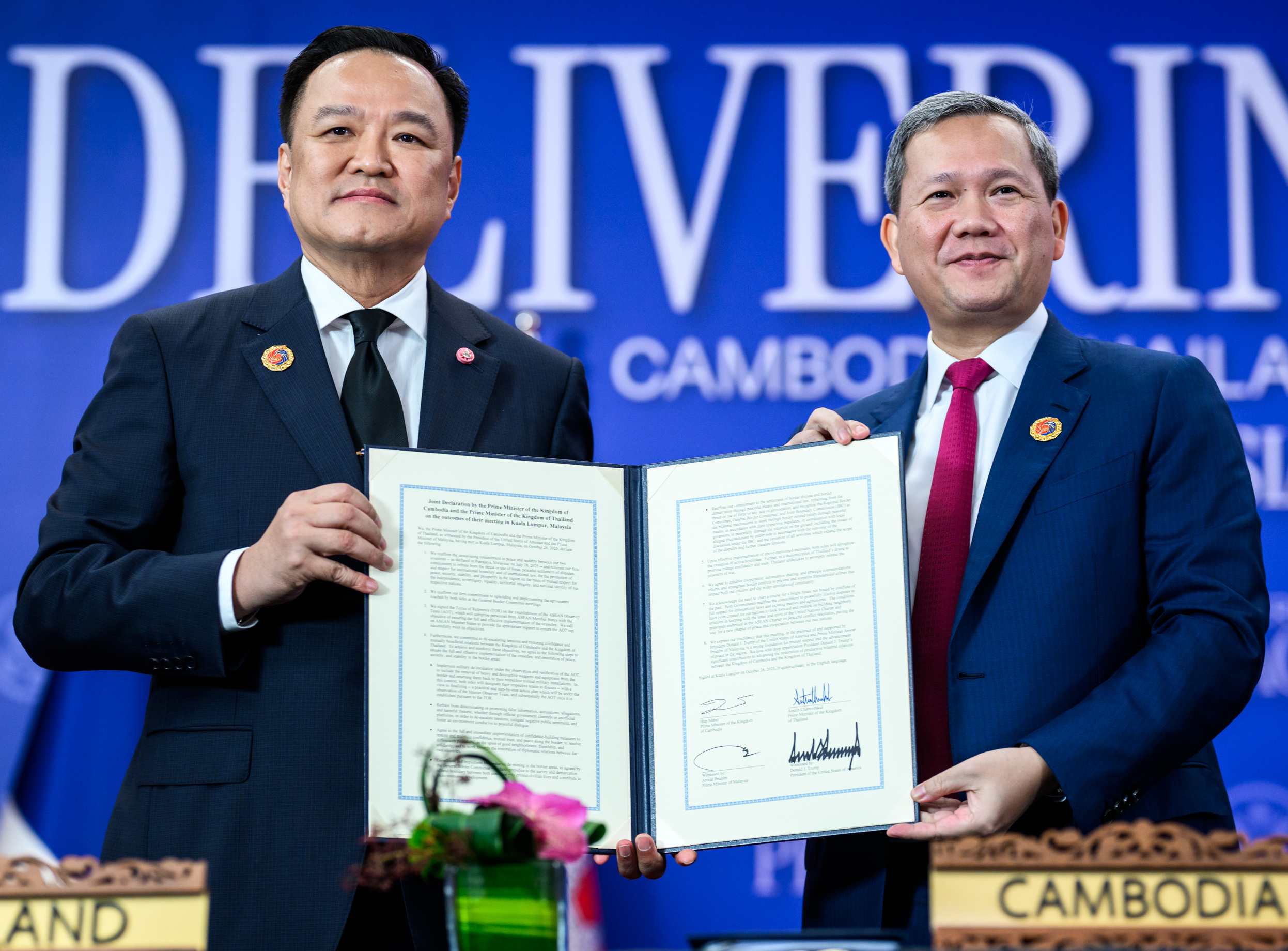
Cambodian prime minister Hun Manet and Thai prime minister Anutin Charnvirakul sign the Kuala Lumpur Peace Accord on 25 October 2025 at the ASEAN Summit

Cambodia has established diplomatic relations with other countries; the government reports 20 embassies in the country including some of its Asian neighbours and those of "important players" during the Paris peace negotiations, including the U.S., Australia, Canada, China, the EU, Japan, and Russia.

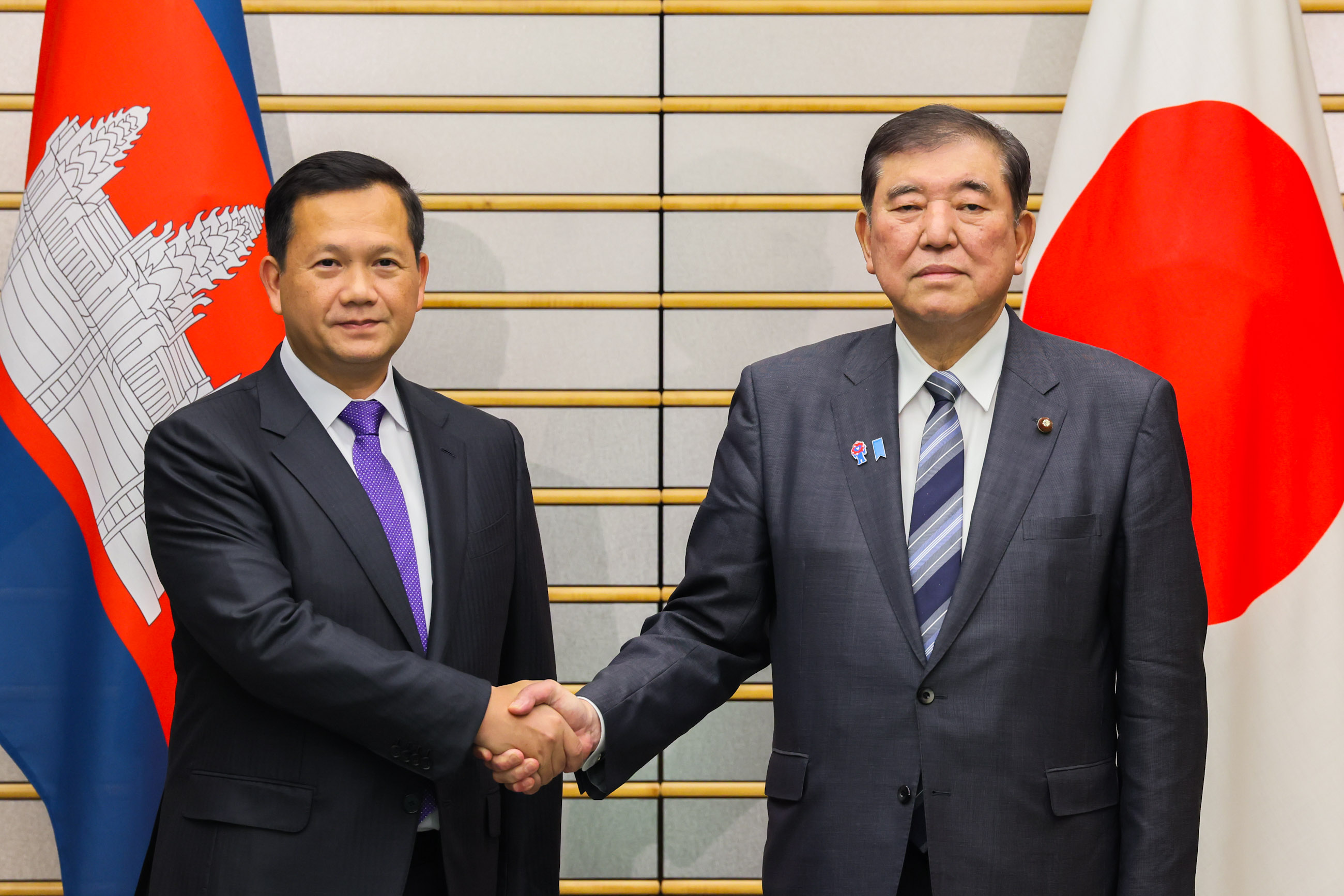
Cambodian prime minister Hun Manet with Japanese prime minister Shigeru Ishiba, 30 May 2025.

While the violent ruptures of the 1970s and 1980s have passed, several border disputes between Cambodia and its neighbours persist. There are disagreements over some offshore islands and sections of the boundary with Vietnam and undefined maritime boundaries. Cambodia and Thailand have border disputes, with troops clashing over land immediately adjacent to the temple of Preah Vihear in particular, leading to a deterioration in relations. Most of the territory belongs to Cambodia, and a combination of Thailand disrespecting international law, Thai troops upbuild in the area and lack of resources for the Cambodian military have left the situation unsettled since 1962.

Cambodia and China have cultivated ties in the 2010s. A Chinese company with the support of the People's Liberation Army built a deep-water seaport along 90 km (56 mi) stretch of Cambodian coastline of the Gulf of Thailand in Koh Kong province; the port is sufficiently deep to be used by cruise ships, bulk carriers or warships. Cambodia's diplomatic support has been invaluable to Beijing's effort to claim disputed areas in the South China Sea. Because Cambodia is a member of ASEAN, and because under ASEAN rules "the objections of one member can thwart any group initiative", Cambodia is diplomatically useful to China as a counterweight to southeast Asian nations that have closer ties to the United States.

Cambodia is the 70th most peaceful country in the world, according to the 2024 Global Peace Index.

=== Military ===
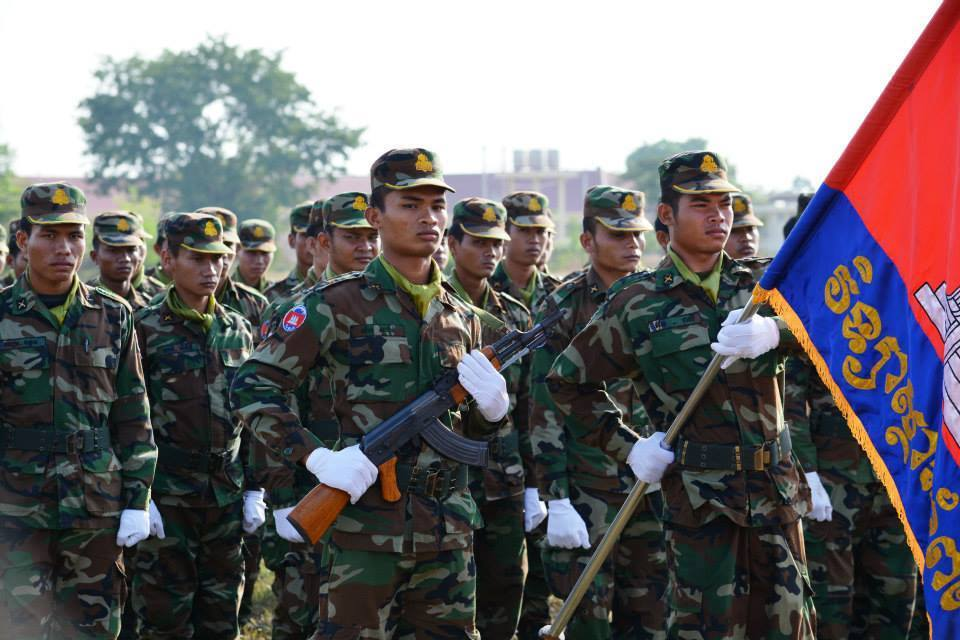
Royal Cambodian Army officers marching

Hun Sen has accumulated highly centralised power in Cambodia, including a praetorian guard that 'appears to rival the capabilities of the country's regular military units', and is allegedly used by Hun Sen to quell political opposition.' Cambodia signed the UN treaty on the Prohibition of Nuclear Weapons.

=== Political culture ===
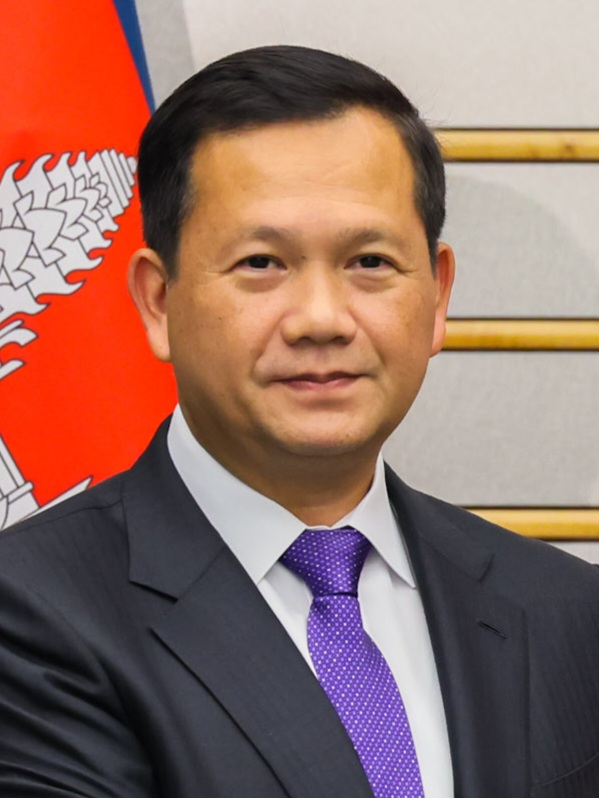
General Hun Manet succeeded his father Hun Sen as Prime Minister in August 2023.

Hun Sen was a former Khmer Rouge commander who was originally installed by the Vietnamese and, after the Vietnamese left the country, maintains his strong man position by violence and oppression when deemed necessary. In 1997, fearing the growing power of his co-PM, Prince Norodom Ranariddh, Hun launched a coup, using the army to purge Ranariddh and his supporters. Ranariddh was ousted and fled to Paris while other opponents of Hun Sen were arrested, tortured, and some summarily executed.

In addition to political oppression, the Cambodian government has been accused of corruption in the sale of areas of land to foreign investors resulting in the eviction of thousands of villagers and taking bribes in exchange for grants to exploit Cambodia's oil wealth and mineral resources. Cambodia is listed as one of the most corrupt governments in the world. Amnesty International recognises one prisoner of conscience in the country: 33-year-old land rights activist Yorm Bopha.

Lawyers did not reappear until 1995 when the Bar Association of the Kingdom of Cambodia was created.

Journalists covering a protest over disputed election results in Phnom Penh on 22 September 2013 say they were deliberately attacked by police and men in plain clothes, with slingshots and stun guns. The attack against the president of the Overseas Press Club of Cambodia, Rick Valenzuela, was captured on video. The violence came amid political tensions as the opposition boycotted the opening of Parliament due to concerns about electoral fraud. Seven reporters sustained minor injuries while at least two Cambodian protesters were hit by slingshot projectiles and hospitalised.

In 2017, Cambodia's Supreme Court dissolved the main opposition party, Cambodia National Rescue Party (CNRP), paving the way for a return to a yet more authoritarian political system.

=== Corruption ===
Corruption affects the judiciary, the police, and other state institutions. There is favouritism. Lack of a distinction between the courts and the executive branch of government makes for a politicisation of the judicial system.

Examples of areas where people encounter corrupt practices in their everyday lives include obtaining medical services, dealing with alleged traffic violations, and pursuing fair court verdicts. Companies deal with extensive red tape when obtaining licences and permits, especially construction-related permits, and the demand for and supply of bribes exist in this process. The 2010 Anti-Corruption Law provided no protection to whistle-blowers, and whistle-blowers can be jailed for up to 6 months if they report corruption that cannot be proven.

=== Human rights ===
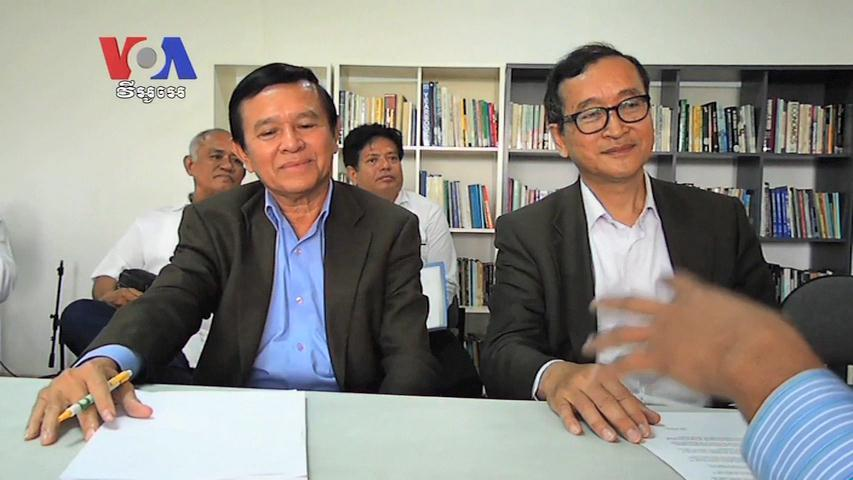
Cambodia's deputy opposition leader Kem Sokha (left) was arrested in September 2017, while opposition leader Sam Rainsy (right) has lived in exile since November 2015.

A U.S. State Department report says "forces under Hun Sen and the Cambodian People's Party have committed frequent and large-scale abuses, including extrajudicial killings and torture, with impunity". The 2023 Global Slavery Index estimated 83,000 people to be enslaved in Cambodia, approximately 0.5% of the population.

There are forced land evictions by senior officials, security forces, and government-connected business leaders. Land has been confiscated from hundreds of thousands of Cambodians over more than a decade for the purpose of self-enrichment and maintaining power of groups of special interests. Non-governmental organisations estimate that "770,000 people have been adversely affected by land grabbing covering at least four million hectares (nearly 10 million acres) of land that have been confiscated", says Paris-based International Federation for Human Rights (FIDH).

== Economy ==
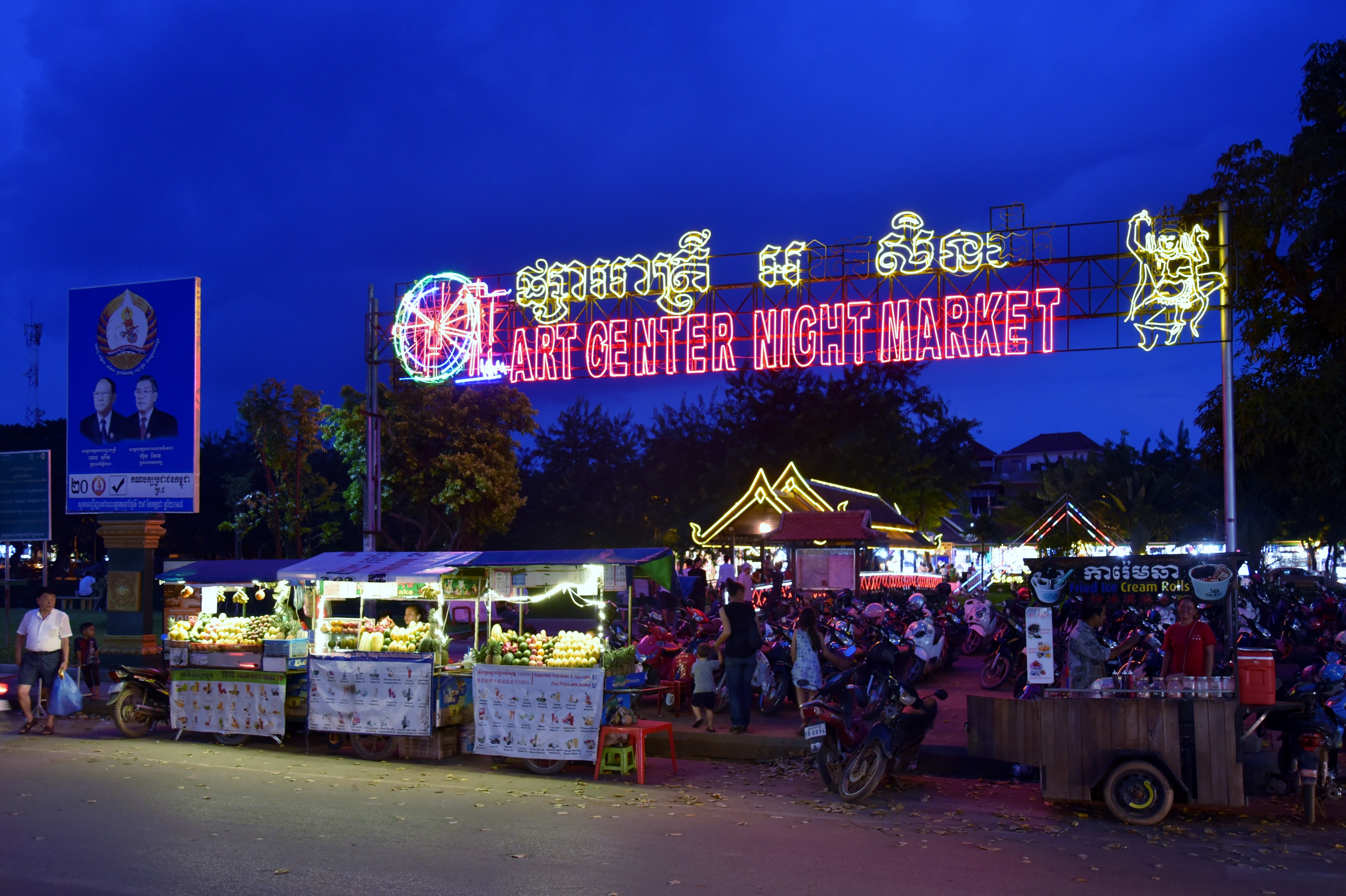
Food stands in Siem Reap

Oil and natural gas deposits found beneath Cambodia's territorial waters in 2005 yield potential and remain mostly untapped, due in part to territorial disputes with Thailand.

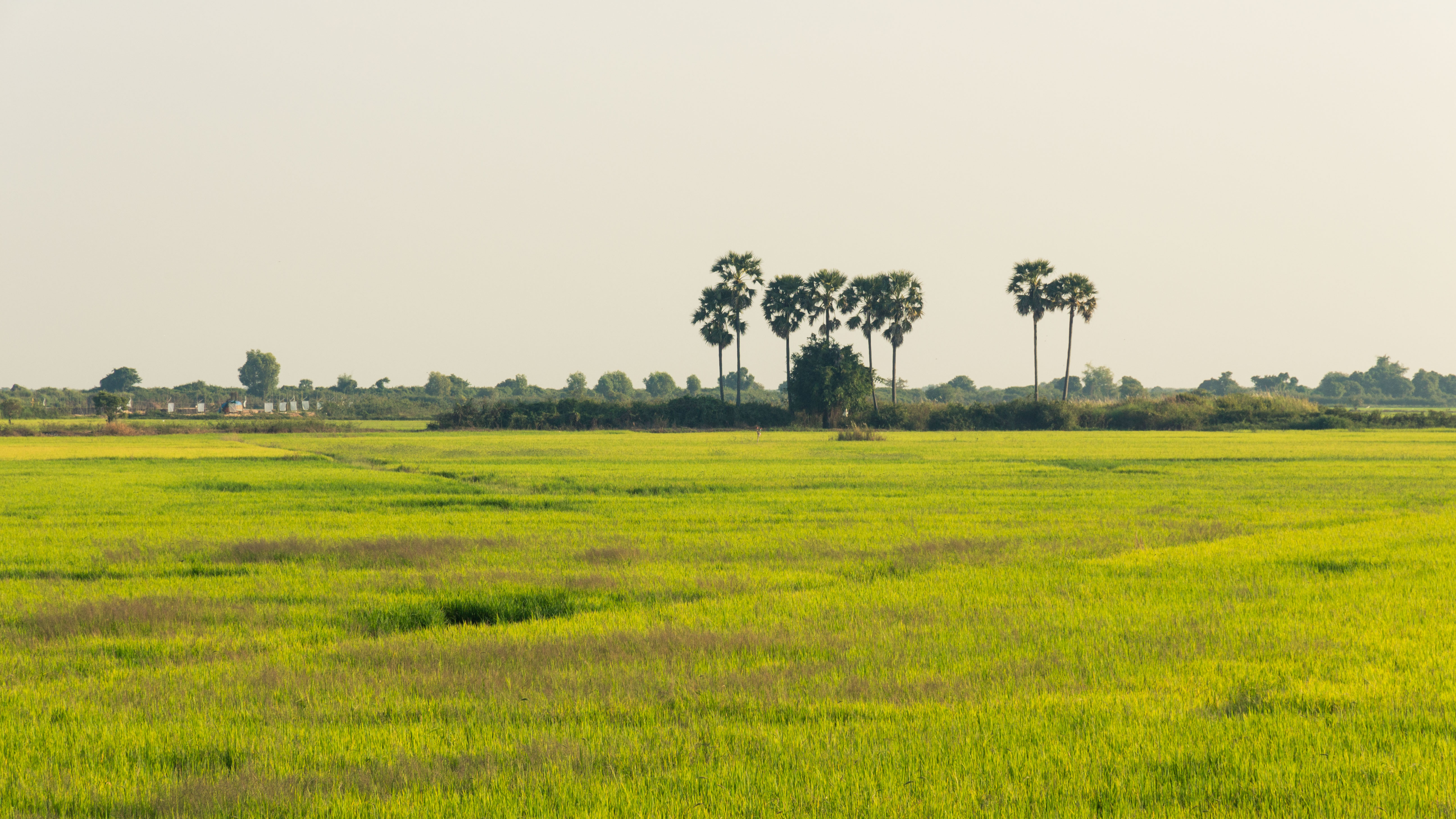
Paddy field in Siem Reap Province

In 2012, Credit Bureau Cambodia was established with direct regulatory oversight by the National Bank of Cambodia.

Fear of renewed political instability and corruption within the government discourage foreign investment and delay foreign aid, while there has been aid from bilateral and multilateral donors. Donors pledged US$504 million to the country in 2004, while the Asian Development Bank alone has provided US$850 million in loans, grants, and technical assistance. Bribes are sometimes demanded from companies operating in Cambodia when obtaining licences and permits, such as construction-related permits.

=== Textiles ===
The garment industry represents the largest portion of Cambodia's manufacturing sector, accounting for 80% of the country's exports. In 2012, the exports grew to US$4.61 billion up 8% over 2011. In the first half of 2013, the garment industry reported exports worth US$1.56 billion.

Better Factories Cambodia was created in 2001 as a partnership between the ILO and the International Finance Corporation (IFC), a member of the World Bank Group. The programme engages with workers, employers, and governments to improve working conditions and boost the competitiveness of the garment industry. On 18 May 2018, the Project Advisory Committee (PAC) of the ILO Better Factories Cambodia Programme met in Phnom Penh to provide input into the draft conclusions and recommendations of the BFC's independent mid-term evaluation, as well as to discuss options on how to further strengthen the programme's transparent reporting initiative. The members of the PAC concurred with the findings of the evaluation related to the impact the programme has had on the Cambodian garment sector and workers, including:

1. contributing to sustained overall growth of the garment industry
2. improving the lives of at least half a million Cambodian workers of factories in the BFC programme and many more of their family members;
3. ensuring that workers receive correct wages and social protection benefits
4. virtually eliminating child labour in the sector
5. making Cambodia's garment factories safer overall
6. creating a "level playing field" for labour across garment sector
7. influencing business practices through (1) using factory data to highlight areas for improvement and (2) being a core part of risk management strategies of international brands and buyers.

=== Tourism ===
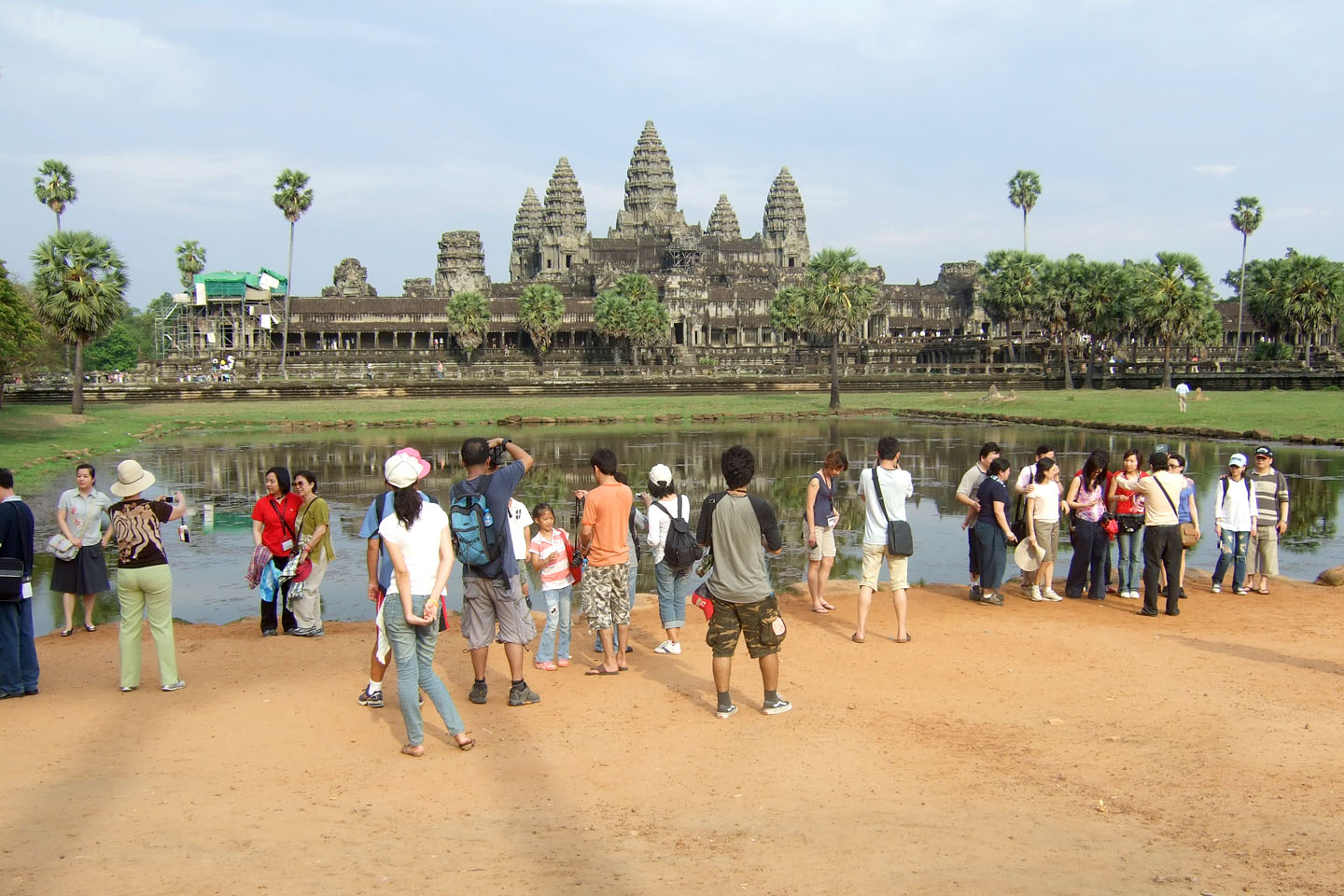
Every year, nearly 2.6 million tourists visit Angkor Wat in Siem Reap, Cambodia.

The tourism industry is the country's second-greatest source of hard currency after the textile industry, specifically garment-making industry. International visitor arrivals in 2023 topped 5.4 million based on the Tourism Statistics Report published by the Minister of Tourism. Reasons for growing tourism include a booming domestic tourism market, government policies to attract the Chinese market, and investments in new infrastructure like the Siem Reap Angkor International Airport. Tourism employs 26% of the country's workforce, which translates into roughly 2.5 million jobs for Cambodians.

Besides Phnom Penh and Angkor Wat, other tourist destinations include Sihanoukville in the southwest, which has beaches, and Battambang in the northwest, both of which are stops for backpackers. The area around Kampot and Kep including the Bokor Hill Station are also of interest to visitors. Tourism has increased steadily each year in the relatively stable period since the 1993 UNTAC elections.

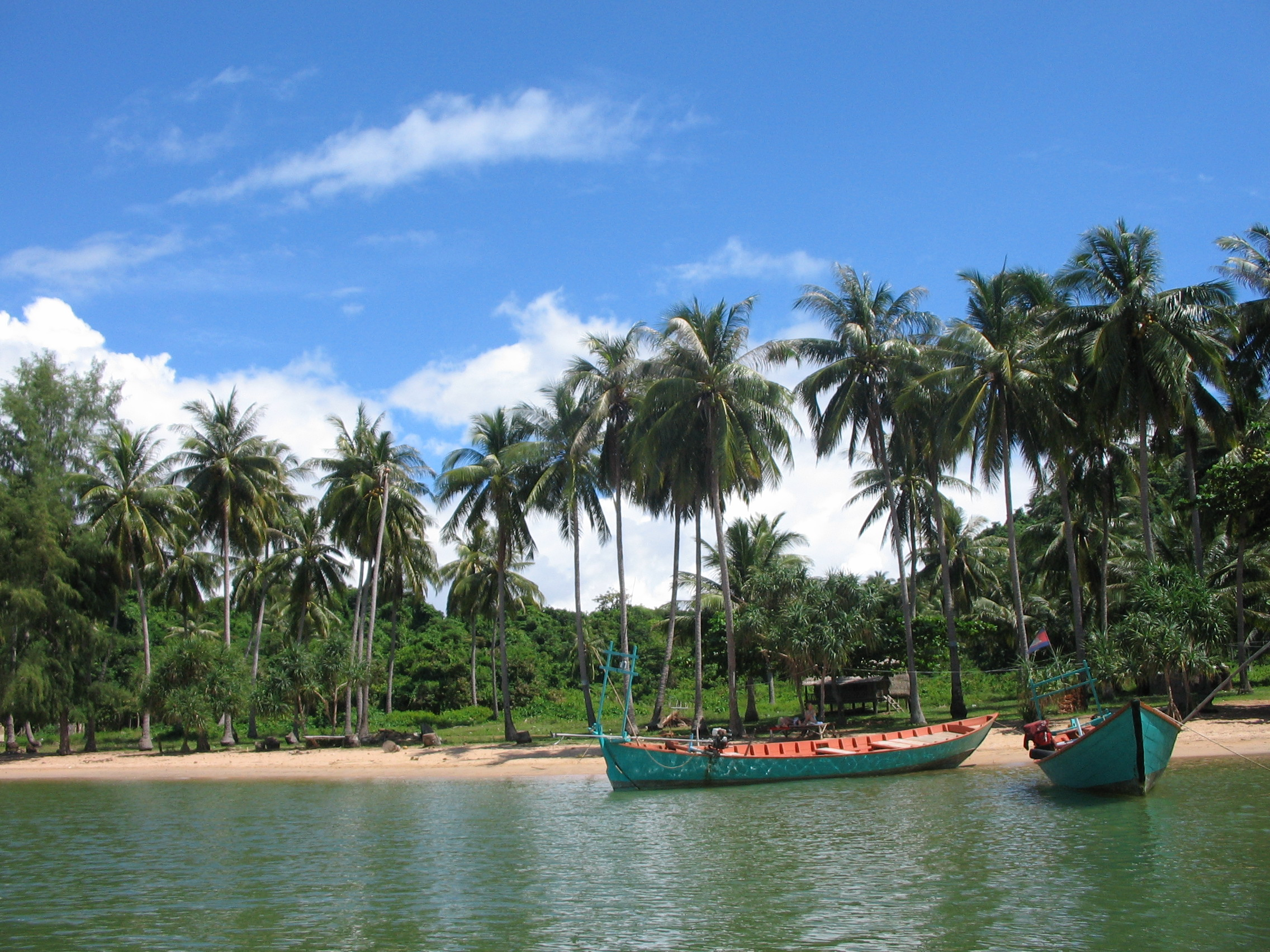
Rabbit Island Koh Tonsay in Cambodia

Most international arrivals in 2018 were Chinese. Tourism receipts exceeded US$4.4 billion in 2018, accounting for almost ten percent of the kingdom's gross national product. The Angkor Wat historical park in Siem Reap Province, the beaches in Sihanoukville, the capital city Phnom Penh, and Cambodia's 150 casinos (up from just 57 in 2014) are the main attractions for foreign tourists.

Cambodia's reputation as a safe destination for tourism has been hindered by civil and political unrest and several examples of crime committed against tourists visiting the kingdom.

Cambodia's tourist souvenir industry employs people around the main places of interest. The quantity of souvenirs produced is insufficient to face the increasing number of tourists. Most products sold to tourists on the markets are imported from China, Thailand, and Vietnam.

=== Transport ===
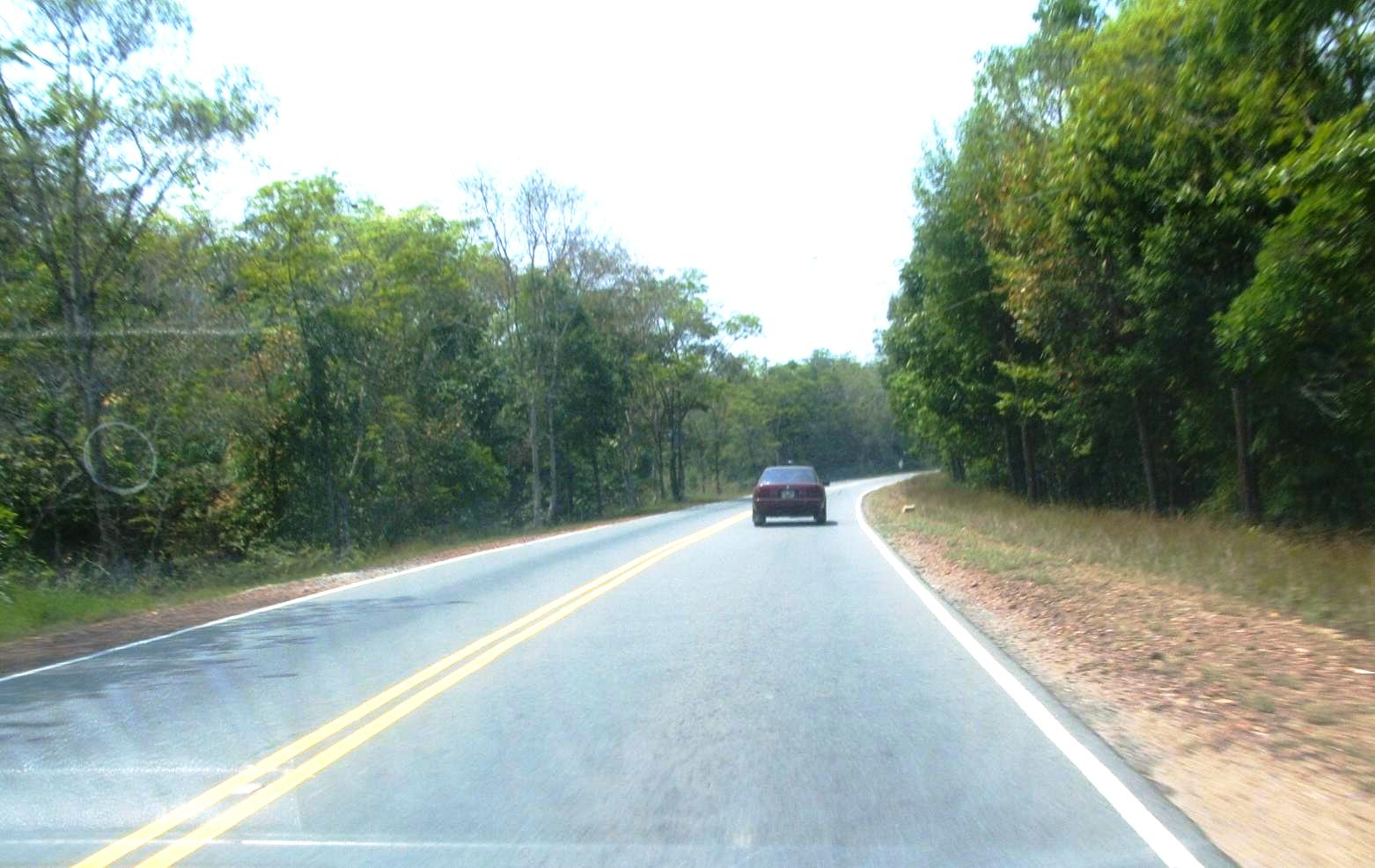
National Highway 4

Cambodia has two rail lines, totalling about 612 km (380 mi) of single, 1 m (3 ft 3 in) gauge track. The lines run from the capital to Sihanoukville on the southern coast. Trains are again running to and from the Cambodian capital and destinations in the south. After 14 years, regular rail services between the two cities restarted – offering a safer option than road for travellers. Trains run from Phnom Penh to Sisophon (trains often run only as far as Battambang). As of 1987, only one passenger train per week operated between Phnom Penh and Battambang and a US$141 million project, funded mostly by the Asian Development Bank, has been started to revitalise the languishing rail system that will "(interlink) Cambodia with major industrial and logistics centres in Bangkok and Ho Chi Minh City".

Techo International Airport, completed in September 2025

In 2004, the number of road fatalities per 10,000 vehicles was ten times higher in Cambodia than in the developed world, and the number of road deaths had doubled in the preceding three years.

The Mekong and the Tonle Sap River, their tributaries, and the Tonle Sap provided avenues, including 3,700 km (2,300 mi) navigable all year by craft drawing 0.6 m (2.0 ft) and another 282 km (175 mi) navigable to craft drawing 1.8 m (5.9 ft).

With increasing economic activity has come an increase in automobile use, while motorcycles still predominate. "Cyclo" (as hand-me-down French) or Cycle rickshaws were more popular in the 1990s and are increasingly replaced by remorques (carriages attached to motorcycles) and rickshaws imported from India. Cyclos are unique to Cambodia in that the cyclist sits behind the passenger seat.

Cambodia has three commercial airports. In 2018, they handled a record of 10 million passengers.

=== Science and technology ===
A National Committee for Science and Technology representing 11 ministries has been in place since 1999. While seven ministries are responsible for the country's 33 public universities, the majority of these institutions come under the umbrella of the Ministry of Education, Youth and Sports.

In 2010, the Ministry of Education, Youth and Sports approved a Policy on Research Development in the Education Sector. This move represented the first step towards a national approach to research and development across the university sector and the application of research for the purposes of national development.

This policy was followed by the country's first National Science and Technology Master Plan 2014–2020. It was officially launched by the Ministry of Planning in December 2014, as the culmination of a two-year process supported by the Korea International Cooperation Agency. The plan makes provision for establishing a science and technology foundation to promote industrial innovation, with a particular focus on agriculture, primary industry and ICTs. Cambodia was ranked 100th in the Global Innovation Index in 2025.

=== Energy ===
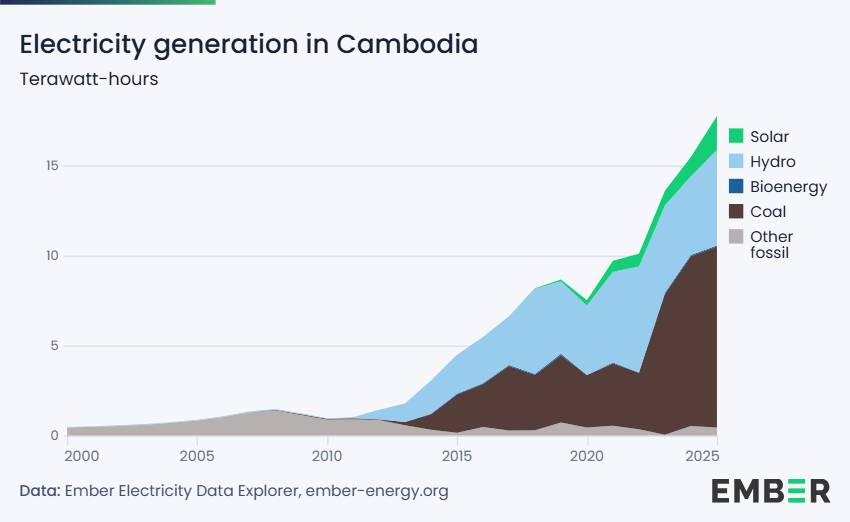
Electricity generation in Cambodia in terawatt-hours

Cambodia has potential for developing renewable energy resources. It serves as a model to learn from for other ASEAN countries in terms of conducting solar power auctions. To attract more investment in renewable energy, the government could improve renewable energy governance, adopt clear targets, develop an effective regulatory framework, improve project bankability and facilitate market entry for international investors. Cambodia is "highly vulnerable" to the negative effects of climate change and it is advised that the country focuses more on developing renewable energy as part of climate change mitigation measures.

=== Trade unions ===
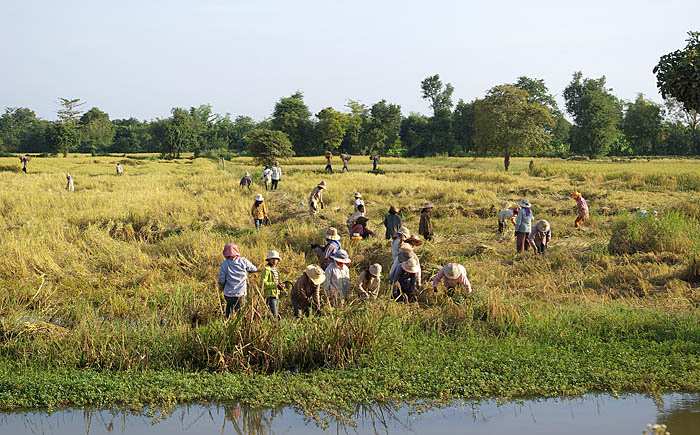
Farmers harvesting rice in Battambang Province

Cambodia ranked among the worst places in the world for organised labour in the 2015 International Trade Union Confederation (ITUC) Global Rights Index, with the country ranked in the category of countries with "no guarantee of rights".

In April 2016, Cambodia's National Assembly adopted a Law on Trade Unions. "The law was proposed at a time when workers have been staging sustained protests in factories and in the streets demanding wage increases and improvements in their working conditions". Concerns about Cambodia's new law were shared not only by labour and rights groups but international organisations more generally: the International Labour Organisation (ILO) Country Office for Thailand, Cambodia and Lao PDR noted that the law had "several key concerns and gaps".

== Demographics ==
Historical population
| Year | Pop. | ±% p.a. |
|---|---|---|
| 1962 | 5,728,771 | — |
| 1980 | 6,600,000 | +0.79% |
| 1994 | 9,900,000 | +2.94% |
| 1996 | 10,700,000 | +3.96% |
| 1998 | 11,437,656 | +3.39% |
| 2004 | 12,800,000 | +1.89% |
| 2008 | 13,395,682 | +1.14% |
| 2013 | 14,700,000 | +1.88% |
| 2019 | 15,552,211 | +0.94% |
National Institute of Statistics: General Population Census of the Kingdom of Cambodia 2019, Chapter 2, p. 6

The French protectorate of Cambodia conducted its first official census in 1921. Only men aged 20 to 60 were counted, as its purpose was for the collection of taxes. After the 1962 population census was conducted, Cambodia's civil conflicts and instability lead to a 36-year-long gap before the country could have another official census in 1998.

As of 2010, half of the Cambodian population is younger than 22 years old. At a 1.04 female to male ratio, Cambodia has the most female-biased sex ratio in the Greater Mekong Subregion. Among the Cambodian population aged over 65, the female to male ratio is 1.6:1.

The total fertility rate in Cambodia was 2.5 children per woman in 2018. The fertility rate was 4.0 children in 2000. Women in urban areas have 2.2 children on average, compared with 3.3 children per woman in rural areas. Fertility is highest in Mondol Kiri and Rattanak Kiri Provinces, where women have an average of 4.5 children, and lowest in Phnom Penh where women have an average of 2.0 children.

=== Ethnic groups ===
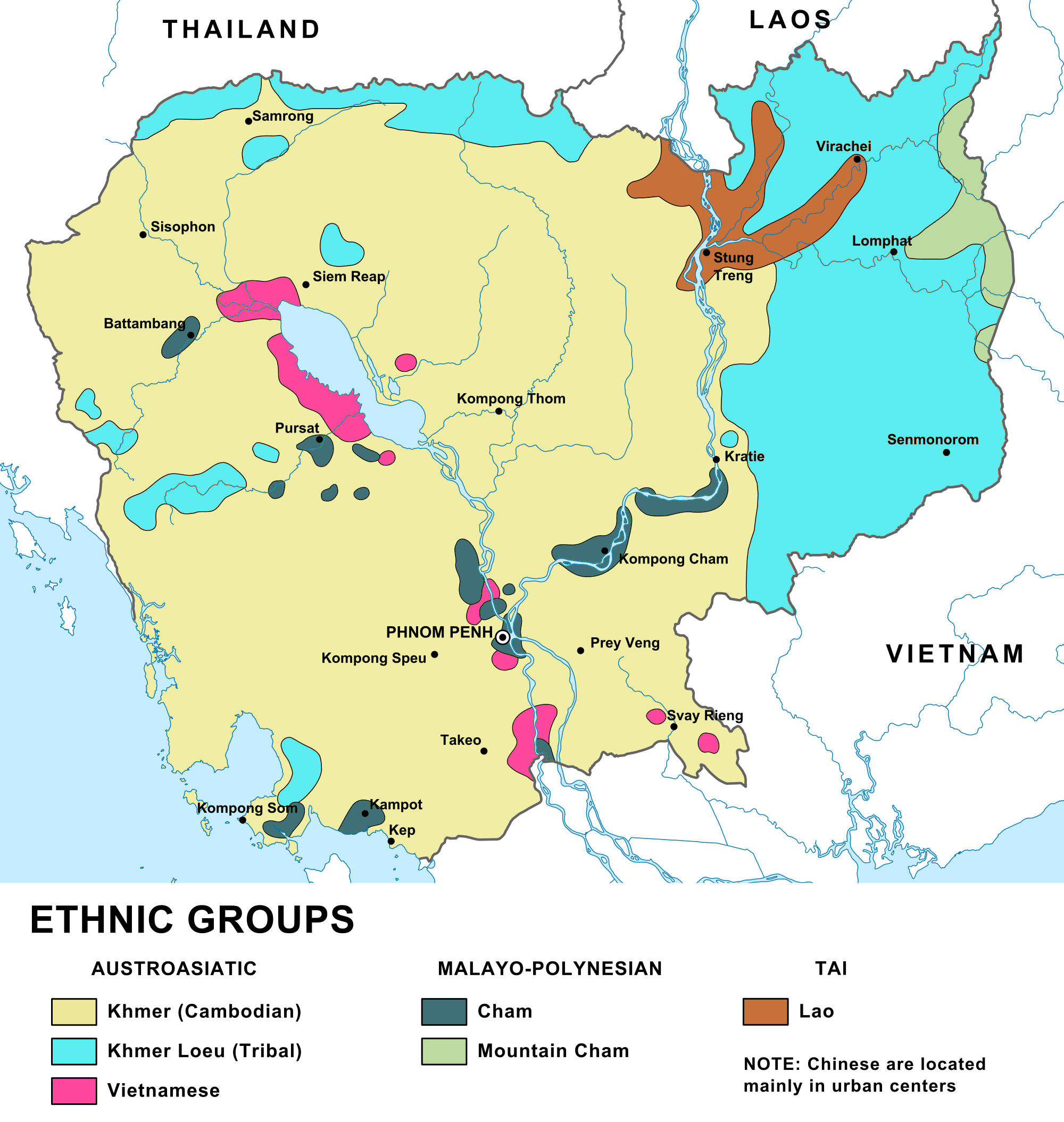
An ethnic map of Cambodia

The majority of Cambodia's population is of ethnic Khmer origin (95.8%) who are speakers of the Khmer language, the country's sole official language. This number includes approximately 17–21 indigenous ethnic groups collectively known as Khmer Loeu ("Highland Khmers" or "Montagnards"). The "non-indigenous ethnic minority" groups are Chams (1.8%), Vietnamese (0.5%) and Chinese (0.6%).

The Vietnamese are the second-largest ethnic minority in Cambodia, with an estimated 16,000 living in provinces concentrated in the southeast of the country adjacent to the Mekong Delta. While the Vietnamese language has been determined to be a Mon–Khmer language, there are fewer cultural connections between the two peoples because the early Khmers were influenced by the Indian cultural sphere while the Vietnamese are part of the Chinese cultural sphere. Ethnic tensions between the Khmer and the Vietnamese can be traced to the Post-Angkor Period (from the 16th to 19th centuries), during which time Vietnam and Thailand each attempted to vassalise a weakened post-Angkor Cambodia, and effectively dominate all of Indochina. Chinese Cambodians are approximately 0.6% of the population.

=== Largest cities ===
Largest cities or towns in Cambodia 2019 Census
| Rank | Name | Province | Pop. | Rank | Name | Province | Pop. |
|---|---|---|---|---|---|---|---|
| 1 | Phnom Penh | ⠀ | 2,281,951 | 11 | Chbar Mon | Kampong Speu | 50,359 |
| 2 | Siem Reap | Siem Reap | 245,494 | 12 | Bavet | Svay Rieng | 43,783 |
| 3 | Battambang | Battambang | 119,251 | 13 | Doun Kaev | Takéo | 43,402 |
| 4 | Sisophon | Banteay Meanchey | 99,019 | 14 | Svay Rieng | Svay Rieng | 41,424 |
| 5 | Poipet | Banteay Meanchey | 98,934 | 15 | Kampong Chhnang | Kampong Chhnang | 41,080 |
| 6 | Ta Khmau | Kandal | 75,629 | 16 | Kampong Cham | Kampong Cham | 38,365 |
| 7 | Sihanoukville | Preah Sihanouk | 73,036 | 17 | Pailin | Pailin | 37,393 |
| 8 | Samraong | Oddar Meanchey | 70,944 | 18 | Prey Veng | Prey Veng | 36,254 |
| 9 | Pursat | Pursat | 58,355 | 19 | Suong | Tboung Khmum | 35,054 |
| 10 | Stueng Saen | Kampong Thom | 53,118 | 20 | Kampot | Kampot | 32,053 |

=== Languages ===
The Khmer language is a member of the Mon–Khmer subfamily of the Austroasiatic language group. French, once the language of government in Indochina, is the language of instruction in some schools and universities that are funded by the government of France. There is a French-language newspaper and some TV channels are available in French. Cambodia is a member of La Francophonie. Cambodian French, a remnant of the country's colonial past, is a dialect found in Cambodia and is sometimes used in government, particularly in court. Since 1993, there has been a growing use of English, which has been replacing French as the main foreign language. English is taught in universities and there is a press in that language, while street signs are bilingual in Khmer and English. Due to this shift, mostly English is used in Cambodia's international relationships, and it has replaced French on Cambodia's stamps and, since 2002, on Cambodian currency.

=== Religion ===
Theravada Buddhism is the official religion of Cambodia, practised by more than 95% of the population with an estimated 4,392 monastery temples throughout the country. Islam is followed by about 2% of the population. There are three varieties of the religion. Two of which are practised by the Cham people; the third is practiced by the descendants of Malays, who have lived in the country for generations. Cambodia's Muslim population is reported to be 80% ethnic Cham.

=== Health ===
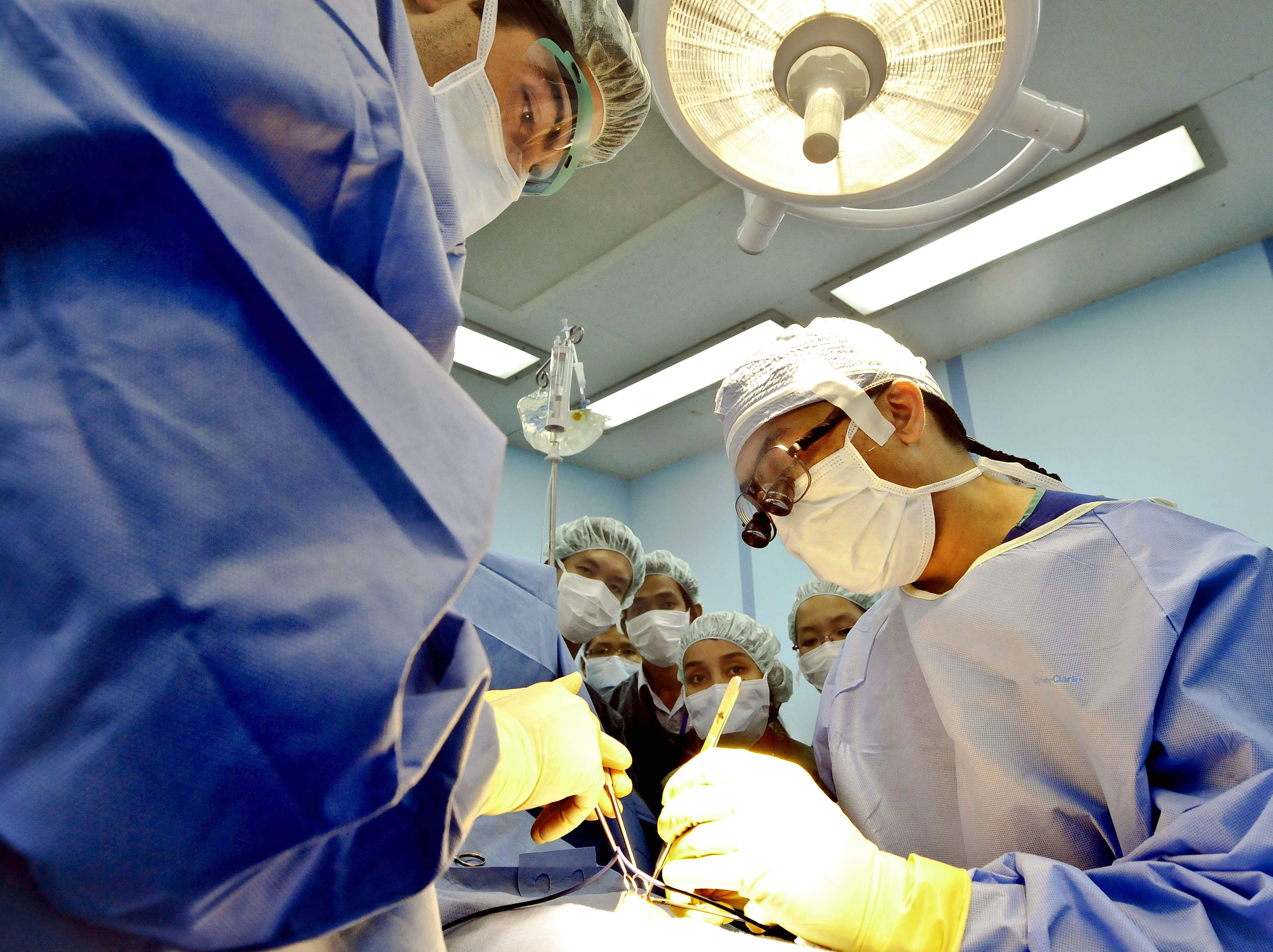
Cambodian medical students watching a surgery

Cambodian life expectancy was 75 years in 2021, an improvement since 1995 when the average life expectancy was 55. Health care is offered by public and private practitioners and research has found that trust in health providers is a factor in improving the uptake of health care services in rural Cambodia.

Cambodia's infant mortality rate has decreased from 86 per 1,000 live births in 1998 to 24 in 2018. In the province with worst health indicators, Ratanakiri, 22.9% of children die before age five.

According to some estimates, unexploded land mines have been responsible for over 60,000 civilian deaths and thousands more maimed or injured since 1970. The number of reported landmine casualties has decreased, from 800 in 2005 to 111 in 2013 (22 dead and 89 injured). Adults that survive landmines sometimes require amputation of one or more limbs and have to resort to begging for survival. Cambodia is expected to be free of land mines by 2025 with the social and economic legacy, including orphans and one in 290 people being an amputee. In Cambodia, landmines and exploded ordnance alone have caused 44,630 injuries between 1979 and 2013, according to the Cambodia Mine/UXO Victim Information System.

In the 2024 Global Hunger Index (GHI), Cambodia ranks 68th out of 127 countries with sufficient data. Cambodia's GHI score is 14.7, which indicates a moderate level of hunger.

=== Education ===
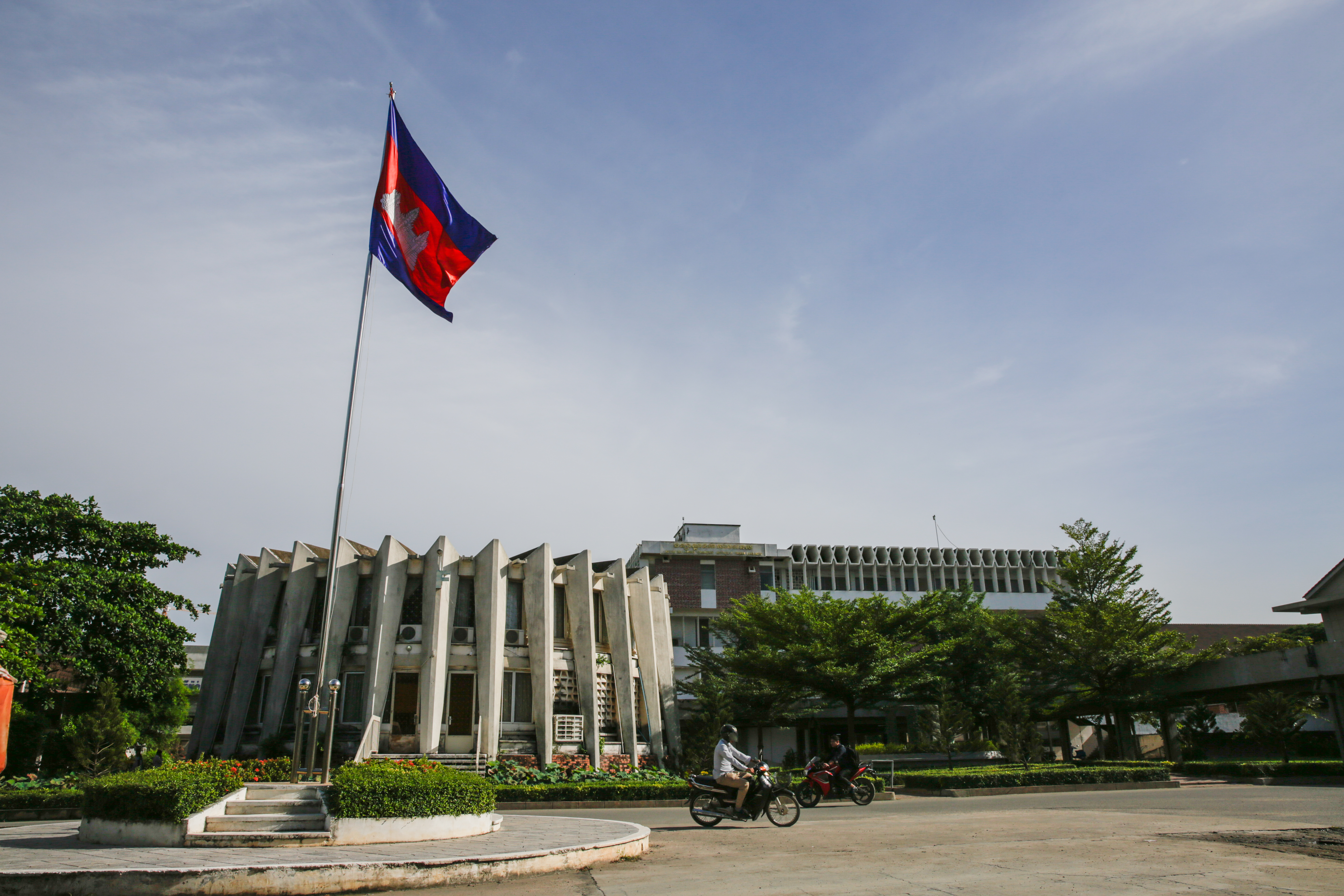
The Institute of Foreign Languages of the Royal University of Phnom Penh

The 2019 Cambodian census estimated that 88.5% of the population was literate (91.1% of men and 86.2% of women). Male youth age (15–24 years) have a literacy rate of 89% compared to 86% for females.

There have been improvements to the education system, especially in terms of primary net enrolment gains, the introduction of programme based-budgeting, and the development of a policy framework which helps disadvantaged children to gain access to education. The country has invested in vocational education, especially in rural areas, to tackle poverty and unemployment.

Traditionally, education in Cambodia was offered by the wats (Buddhist temples), thus providing education exclusively for the male population. Education has undergone setbacks from child labour, A study by Kim (2011) reports that most employed children in Cambodia are enrolled in school and their employment is associated with late school entry, negative impacts on their learning outcomes, and increased drop out rates. With respect to academic performance among Cambodian primary school children, research showed that parental attitudes and beliefs played a role.

=== Crime ===
In 2017, Cambodia had a homicide rate of 2.4 per 100,000 population.

Prostitution is de jure illegal in Cambodia. However, in a series of 1993 interviews of women about prostitution, three quarters of the interviewees found being a prostitute to be a norm and a profession they felt was not shameful having. That same year, it was estimated that there were about 100,000 sex workers in Cambodia.

In 2019, Prime Minister Hun Sen signed a directive banning the Finance Ministry from issuing new online gambling licences, while operators currently holding online licences would only be allowed to continue operating until those licences expire. The directive cited the fact that "some foreigners have used this form of gambling to cheat victims inside and outside the country" as justifying the new policy. Cambodia had issued over 150 such licences before the new policy was announced.

Since the 2020s, Cambodia has become a base for online scam operations run from guarded compounds, and the operations have been linked to trafficking for forced criminality, forced labour, and other abuses. A 2023 UN human-rights report estimated that around 100,000 people in Cambodia were held in scam operations. A 2025 Amnesty International report identified at least 53 scam compounds in Cambodia and documented cases of slavery and torture, and it alleged official failures that enabled abuses to persist, which the Cambodian government denied. Cambodian officials also rejected allegations of complicity and pointed to enforcement efforts against online scams. In October 2025, the U.S. Department of Justice filed what it described as the largest forfeiture action in its history, seeking forfeiture of approximately 127,271 bitcoin tied to a case alleging that Chen Zhi, described as founder and chairman of the Prince Holding Group, directed forced-labour scam compounds in Cambodia. In 2025, the U.S. Treasury's Financial Crimes Enforcement Network identified Cambodia-based Huione Group as a "primary money laundering concern". One of the directors of Huione Pay is Cambodian businessman Hun To, nephew of Hun Sen and cousin of Hun Manet.

== Culture ==
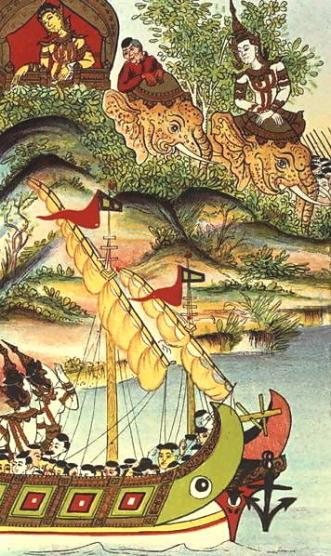
The 19th-century illustration tale of Vorvong & Sorvong

Traditionally, the Khmer people have a recorded information on Tra leaves. Tra leaf books record legends of the Khmer people, the Ramayana, the origin of Buddhism and other prayer books. They are taken care of by wrapping in cloth to protect from moisture and the climate. Bon Om Touk (Cambodian Water & Moon Festival), the annual boat rowing contest, is the most attended Cambodian national festival. Held at the end of the rainy season when the Mekong River begins to sink back to its normal levels allowing the Tonle Sap River to reverse flow, approximately 10% of Cambodia's population attends this event each year to play games, give thanks to the moon, watch fireworks, dine, and attend the boat race in a carnival-type atmosphere.

Every year, Cambodians visit pagodas across the country to mark the Pchum Ben (Ancestors' Day). During the 15-day festival, people offer prayers and food to the spirits of their dead relatives. For most Cambodians, it is a time to remember their relatives who died during the 1975–1979 Khmer Rouge regime.

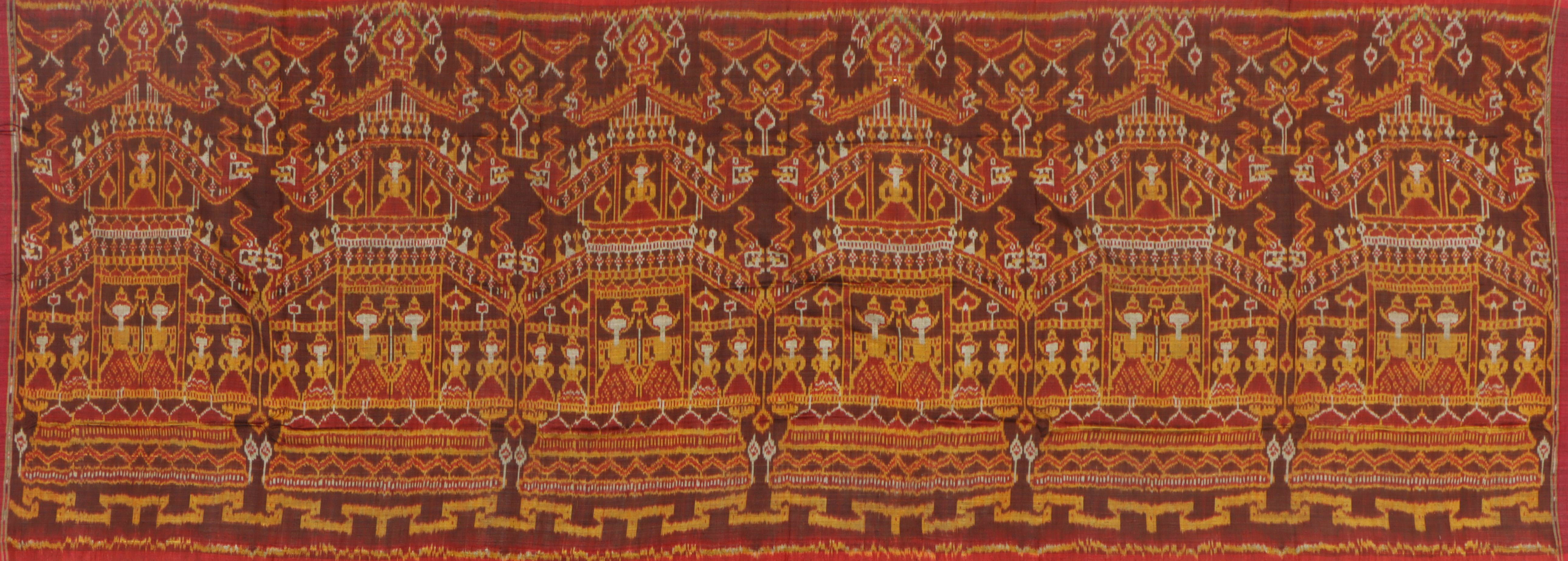
Antique Silk Ikat Pidan Temple Hanging courtesy Wovensouls Textiles Art Gallery Singapore

=== Cuisine ===
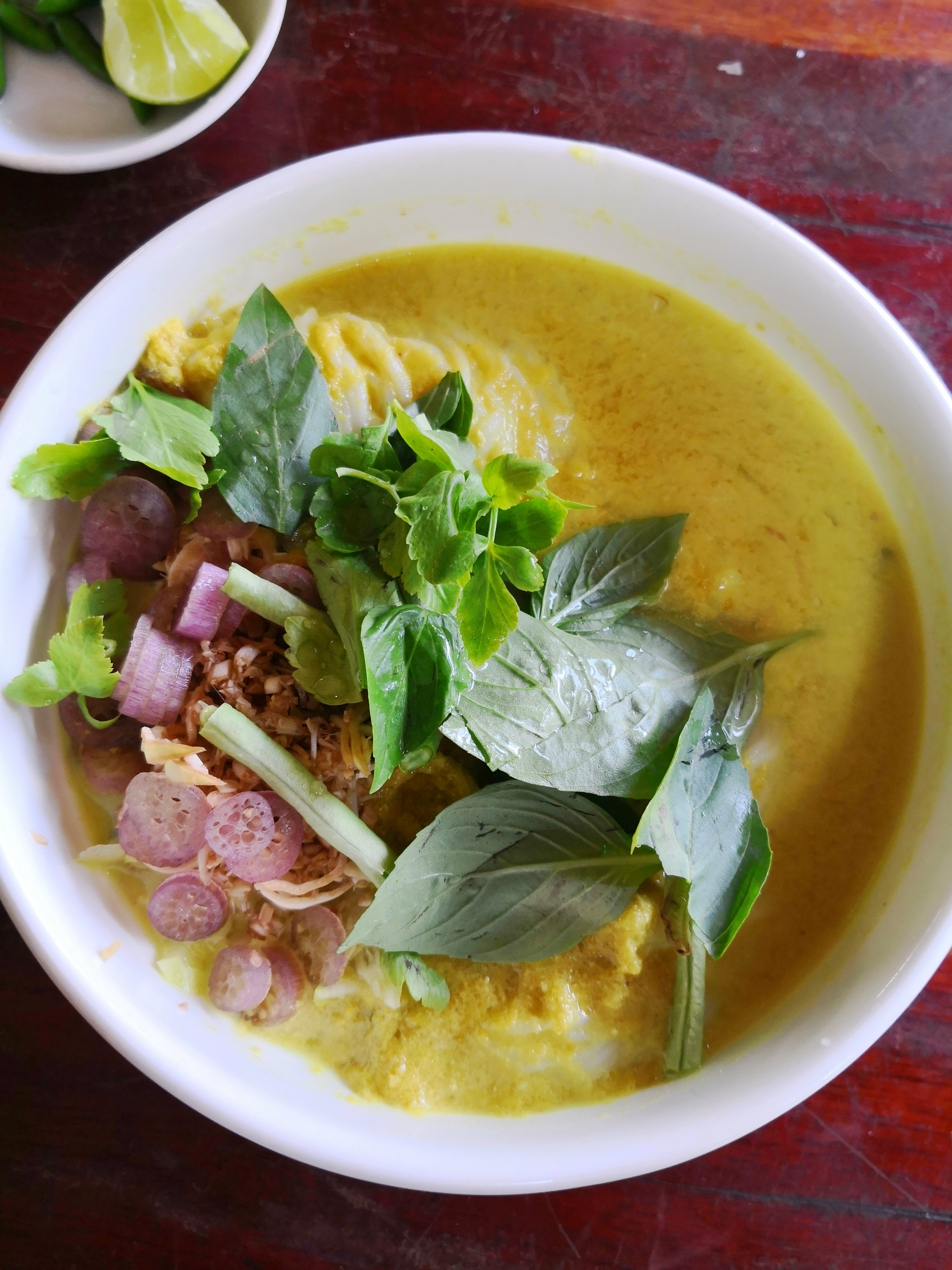
Num banhchok

Rice is the staple grain, as in other Southeast Asian countries. Fish from the Mekong and Tonlé Sap rivers is a part of the diet. The supply of fish and fish products for food and trade as of 2000 was 20 kg (44 lb) per person or 2 ounces per day per person.

French influence on Cambodian cuisine includes the Cambodian red curry with toasted baguette bread. The toasted baguette pieces are dipped in the curry and eaten. Cambodian red curry is eaten with rice and rice vermicelli noodles. A dine out dish, kuyteav, is a pork broth rice noodle soup with fried garlic, scallions, green onions that may contain toppings such as beef balls, shrimp, pork liver or lettuce. Kampot pepper accompanies crab at the Kep crab shacks and squid in the restaurants on the Ou Trojak Jet river.

Tea is grown in Mondulkiri Province and around Kirirom. Te krolap is a strong tea, made by putting water and a mass of tea leaves into a glass, placing a saucer on top, and turning the whole thing upside down to brew. When it is dark enough, the tea is decanted into another cup and plenty of sugar added, and no milk. Lemon tea te kdau kroch chhma, made with Chinese red-dust tea and lemon juice, is refreshing both hot and iced and is generally served with a more hefty dose of sugar. Regarding coffee, the beans are generally imported from Laos and Vietnam – while domestically produced coffee from Ratanakiri Province and Mondulkiri Province can be found in some places. Beans are traditionally roasted with butter and sugar, plus other ingredients that might include anything from rum to pork fat, giving the beverage a sometimes faintly chocolatey aroma.

Cambodia has industrial breweries, located mainly in Sihanoukville Province and Phnom Penh. There are a growing number of microbreweries in Phnom Penh and Siem Reap. As of 2019, there are 12 brewpubs or microbreweries in Cambodia. Rice wine is an alcoholic drink. It is sometimes infused with fruits or medicinal herbs. When prepared with macerated fruits or spices, like the Sombai liqueur, it is called sra tram (soaked wine).

=== Dance ===
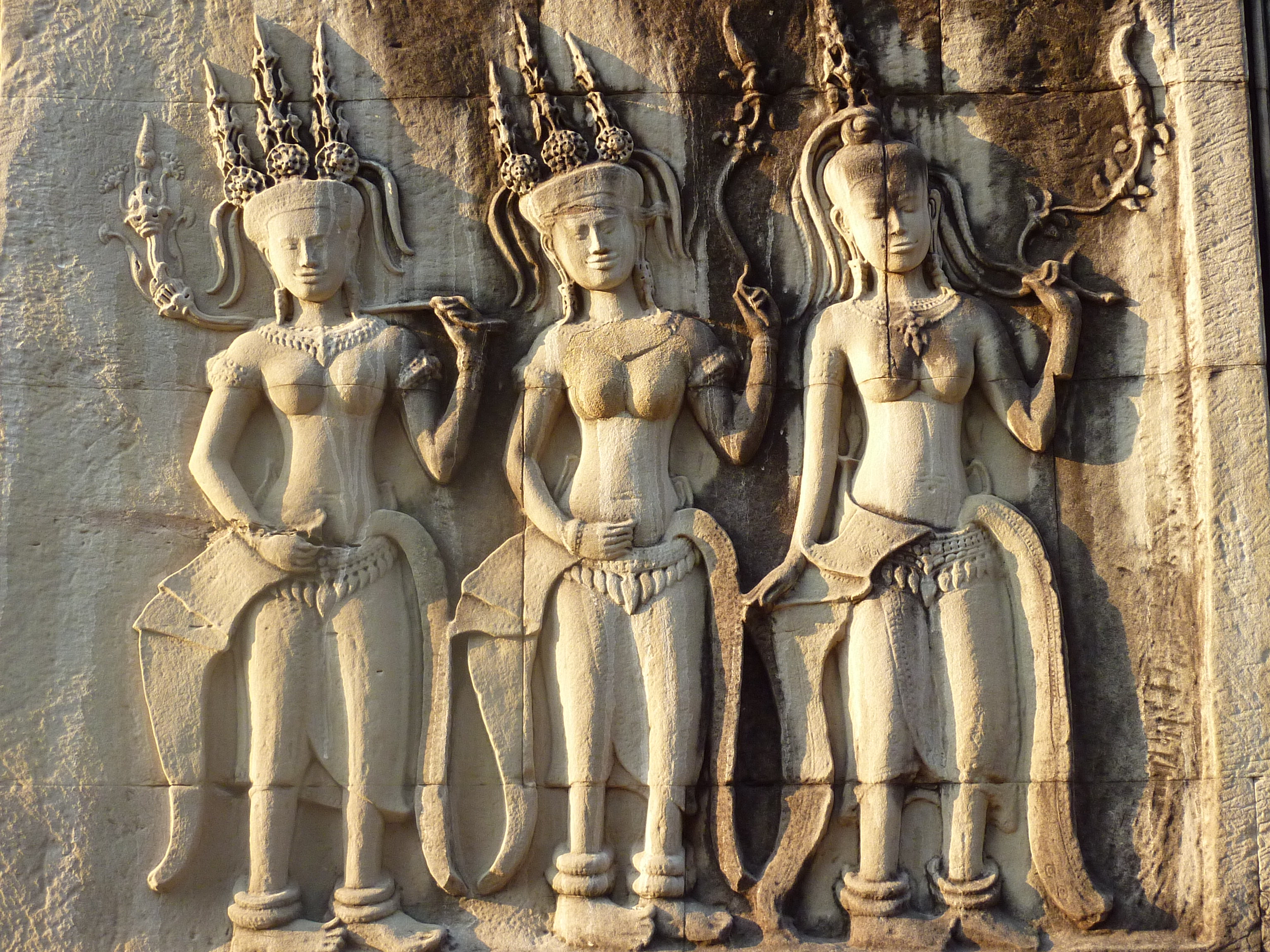
Apsara dancers at Angkor Wat

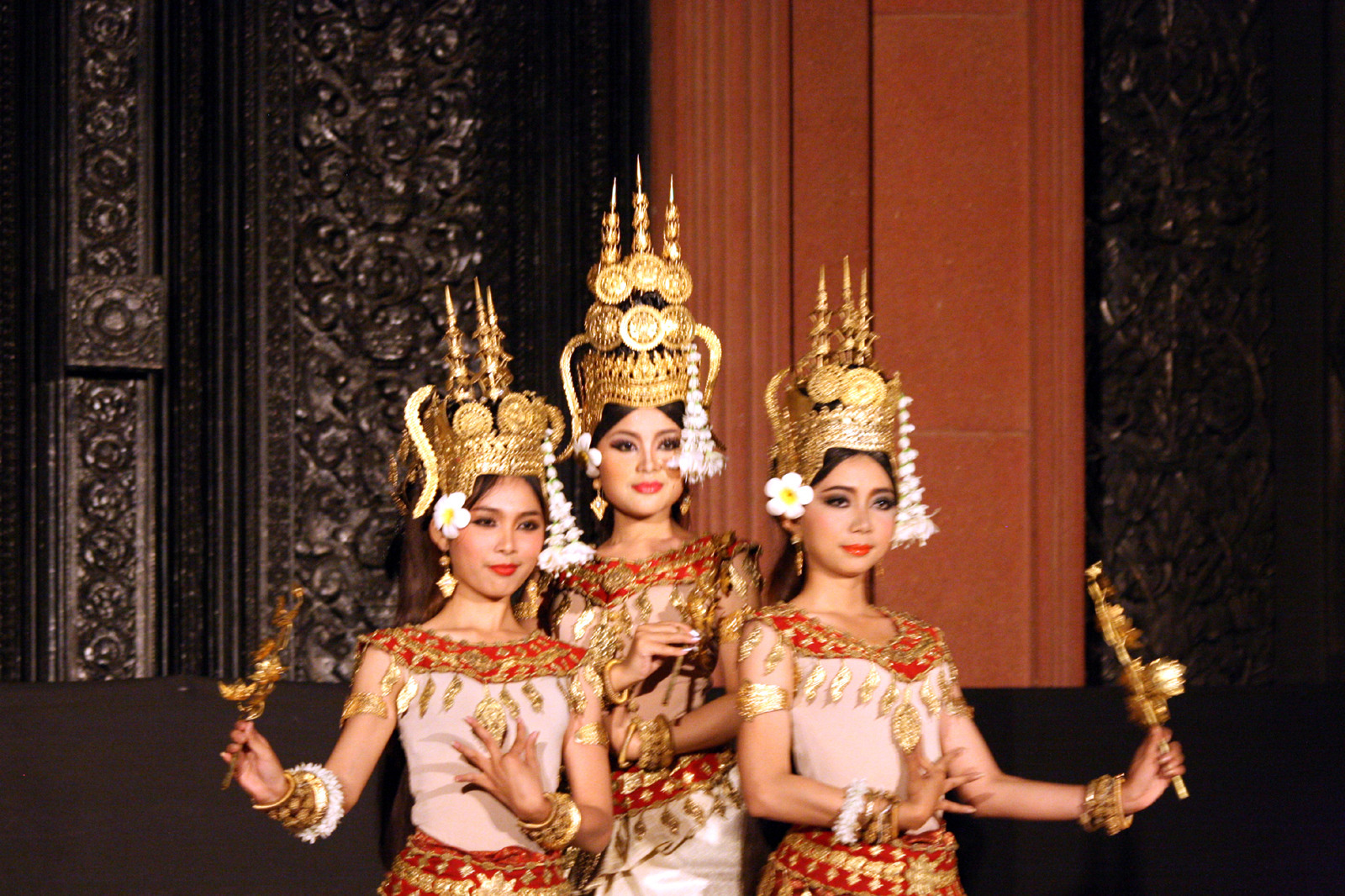
Khmer Apsara dancers

Khmer classical dance is the form of stylised performance art established in the royal courts of Cambodia exhibited for both entertainment and ceremonial purposes. The dances are performed by costumed, trained men and women on public occasions for tribute, invocation or to enact traditional stories and epic poems such as Reamker, the Khmer version of the Ramayana.

Cambodian folk dance, sometimes performed to mahori music, celebrates the cultural and ethnic groups of Cambodia. Folk dances originated in the villages and are performed, for the most part, by the villagers for the villagers. The movements are less stylised and the clothing worn is that of the people the dancers are portraying, such as hill tribes, Chams or farmers. Typically faster-paced than classical dance, folk dances display themes of the "common person" such as love, comedy or warding off evil spirits.

=== Music ===
Traditional Cambodian music dates back as far as the Khmer empire.

Popular music is performed with western style instruments or a mixture of traditional and western instruments. Dance music is composed in particular styles for social dances. The music of crooner Sinn Sisamouth, Ros Sereysothea, and Pen Ran from the 1960s to the 1970s is considered to be the classic pop music of Cambodia. During the Khmer Rouge revolution, some singers of the 1960s and 1970s were murdered, starved to death, or overworked to death by the Khmer Rouge.

In the 1980s, Keo Sarath (a refugee resettled in the United States) and others carried on the legacy of the classic singers, sometimes remaking their popular songs. The 1980s and 1990s saw the rise in popularity of kantrum, a music style of the Khmer Surin set to modern instrumentation.

In 2013, the Australian hip hop group Astronomy Class has recorded music with Kak Channthy, a native-born Cambodian female singer.

== See also ==
- Outline of Cambodia
