= Baladityapura =

Capital of the Lower Chenla

- បាលទិត្យវបុរៈ (Khmer)
- Aninditapura
- Location in Cambodia
- 10°59′42″N 104°58′29″E
- Periods: Middle Ages
- Location: Takéo, Cambodia
- Region: Southeast Asia

History
- Built: early 7th century AD
- Built by: Baladitya
- Abandoned: 802 AD

Site notes
- Architectural styles: Angkor Borei, Phnom Da, and Phnom Chisor
- Condition: restored and ruined
- Public access: Yes

Baladityapura (Khmer: បាលទិត្យវបុរៈ, Thai: พลาทิตยปุระ), also called Aninditapura (Khmer: អនិន្ទិតបុរៈ, Thai: อนินทิตยปุระ), was a city near Vyadhapura, the former capital of Funan Kingdom, on the opposite bank of the Mekong River.

== History ==
Baladityapura was founded by Baladitya during the reign of King Isanavarman I in the early 7th century CE. After moving from Indrapura or Amarendrapura, King Jayavarman II established new capital, Mahendraparvata on the sacred hill top site of Phnom Kulen. After a century, it was abandoned when King Yasovarman I translocated the capital from Hariharalaya to Yasodharapura.

According to Paul Pelliot, Sambhupura (Isanapura) was the capital of Land Chenla (Upper Chenla) and Vyadhapura was the capital of Water Chenla (Lower Chenla), but, according to George Coedès, Baladityapura (Aninditapura) was the capital of Water Chenla and Wen Tan (Wen Dan) was Land Chenla.
