= Preah Srey Isanavarman Museum of Economy and Money =

Preah Srey Içanavarman Museum of Economy and Money
- សារមន្ទីរ ព្រះស្រីឦសានវរ្ម័ន
- Established: 2019
- Location: Sangkat Wat Phnom, Khan Daun Penh, Phnom Penh, Cambodia
- Coordinates: 11°34′28″N 104°55′32″E
- Type: Economy and money museum
- Director: Blaise Kilian (co-director)
- Website: sosoro.nbc.gov.kh

Preah Srey Isanavarman Museum of Economy and Money (Khmer: សារមន្ទីរ ព្រះស្រីឦសានវរ្ម័ន), commonly known as the SOSORO Museum, is a museum in Phnom Penh, Cambodia, dedicated to the country's economic, monetary, and trade history. Owned, funded, and managed by the National Bank of Cambodia, it explores nearly 2,000 years of Cambodian history through the lens of economics and currency, highlighting interconnections between political, social, and geopolitical changes and monetary evolution. The museum's name honors King Isanavarman I (also spelled Içanavarman), a 7th-century ruler of the Chenla kingdom, whose rare gold coin serves as a centerpiece exhibit.

== History ==
The museum is housed in a French colonial-era building originally constructed as the Résidence de la Mairie (town hall residence) in 1908 and later used as the Phnom Penh Municipality office from 1920. The structure, located in the heart of Phnom Penh's old colonial district, fell into disrepair before being restored and repurposed as a museum.

Planning for the museum began under the guidance of Cambodian Prime Minister Hun Sen around 2015, with the National Bank of Cambodia leading the initiative. A pivotal moment occurred in 2012 when a young archaeologist discovered a unique 7th-century gold coin minted during the reign of King Isanavarman I in a Phnom Penh souvenir shop. The coin was authenticated by experts at the National Bank of Cambodia and became a key artifact for the museum.

The museum was officially inaugurated on 8 April 2019 by Prime Minister Hun Sen. It temporarily closed during the COVID-19 pandemic but later reopened. In 2023, the museum welcomed over 36,000 visitors.

== Exhibits and collections ==
The museum's permanent exhibition is divided into twelve modules, utilizing state-of-the-art museography including interactive displays, audiovisual documentaries, video games, and touch screens to explain economic and monetary principles. Key themes include the barter economy of the ancient Angkor Empire (8th–13th centuries), where no local currency was used; the influence of foreign currencies such as Siamese and Annamese coins; the introduction of the Indochinese piastre under French colonial rule; the establishment of the Cambodian riel in 1955; its abolition during the Khmer Rouge era and reintroduction in 1980; and the phenomenon of dollarization since 1992, when UN payments in U.S. dollars led to dual currency usage.

Collections feature monetary artifacts from ancient periods, including the rare Chenla gold coin, as well as artifacts, multimedia presentations, and displays on historical figures and events. The museum promotes awareness of the riel's role in national sovereignty and the functions of the central bank.

Temporary exhibitions have included "The Journey of King Sisowath in France in 1906: A Mutual Revelation", a 360° immersive virtual experience; "Pigments from the Past: Scenes of Cambodia through Pagoda Paintings (1890–1970)"; and, in August 2025, a display of rare historical photographs of Cambodia.

Additional facilities include a library, shop, garden, and café.

== See also ==
- National Museum of Cambodia
- National Bank of Cambodia
