= Chenla =

Ancient kingdom located in Indochina

Chenla ចេនឡា (Khmer)
- 550–802
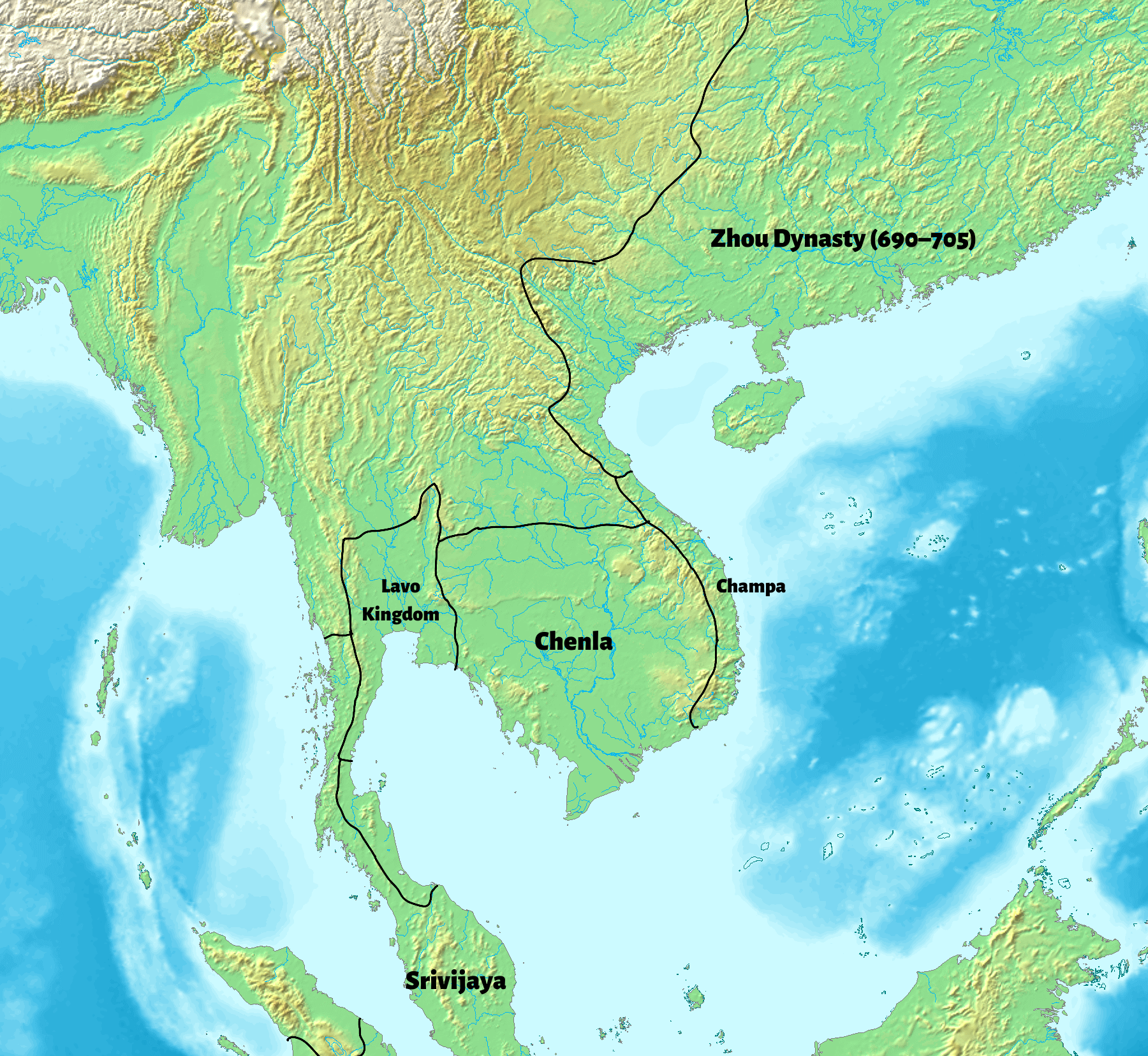
- Map of mainland Southeast Asia (700 CE)
- Capital: Shrestapura; Isanapura; Sambhupura
- Common languages: Old Khmer (common); Sanskrit (court, religious)
- Religion: Hinduism (Official); Buddhism
- Government: Mandala kingdom
- Historical era: Post-classical era
  - Vassal of Funan: 550
  - Embassy to China: 616/617
  - Independence: 627
  - Separation into Land-Water: c. 707
  - Javanese invasion: 790
  - Jayavarman II proclaimed as chakravatin: 802
- Currency: Native coins
Preceded by	Succeeded by
Funan	Khmer Empire
- Today part of: Cambodia; Laos; Thailand; Vietnam

Chenla or Zhenla (Chinese: 真臘; pinyin: Zhēnlà; Wade–Giles: Chen-la; Khmer: ចេនឡា, romanized: Chénla, Khmer pronunciation: [ceːnlaː]) is the Chinese designation for the vassal of the kingdom of Funan preceding the Khmer Empire that existed from around the late 6th to the early 9th century in Indochina. The name was still used in the 13th century by the Chinese envoy Zhou Daguan, author of The Customs of Cambodia. It appears on the Mao Kun map. However, modern historiography applies the name exclusively to the period from the late 6th to the early 9th century. This period of Cambodian history is known by historians as the Pre-Angkor period. It is doubted whether Chenla ever existed as a unitary kingdom, or if this is a misconception by Chinese chroniclers. Most modern historians assert that "Chenla" was in fact just a series of loose and temporary confederations of principalities in the pre-Angkor period.

== Etymology ==
"Chenla" or "Zhenla" was the name given in Chinese accounts of an entity that sent tributes to Chinese emperors. The word "Chenla" or "Zhenla" and likewise Funan are unknown in the Old Khmer language. Folk etymology attempts to link Chenla (真臘) to a translation of its Chinese name as "Pure Beeswax", which was one of its regional commodities mentioned in Chinese annals. It has been suggested that the name means as Zhenla has been reconstructed to Tsienliäp in Tang dynasty pronunciation, which is similar in sound to the Cambodian city whose name is often taken to mean However, it has been pointed out that this derivation Cambodia occurred centuries after the name was first used. Therefore, although the names Chenla could perhaps be related city, Michael Vickery argued that the original meanings of both names are unknown.

Similar explanation however may apply to a later variant form Zhanla (占臘); according to author Peter Harris: "It very likely means 'Defeated Chams' since Zhan is the word in Chinese for Cham." He also noted the explanation given in Mingshi: "During the qingyuan reign period (1195–1200) of the Song dynasty, Cambodia wiped out Champa and took over its land. Because of this, the country changed its name to Zhanla. But during the Yuan dynasty it went on being called Zhenla."

Chen La may have been known through several other names such as Wen Dan (文單 reconstructed as Muntal, maybe mandala) or according to Tatsuo Hoshino Po-Lou, Wen Dan being its capital.

Following Hindu god king (devaraja) tradition the king chose the Sanskrit name of a patron deity or an avatar, followed by the suffix –varman, meaning 'protected by', obeying the code of conduct Manusmṛti, the Laws of Manu for the Kshatriya warrior caste.

== History ==
=== Origins ===
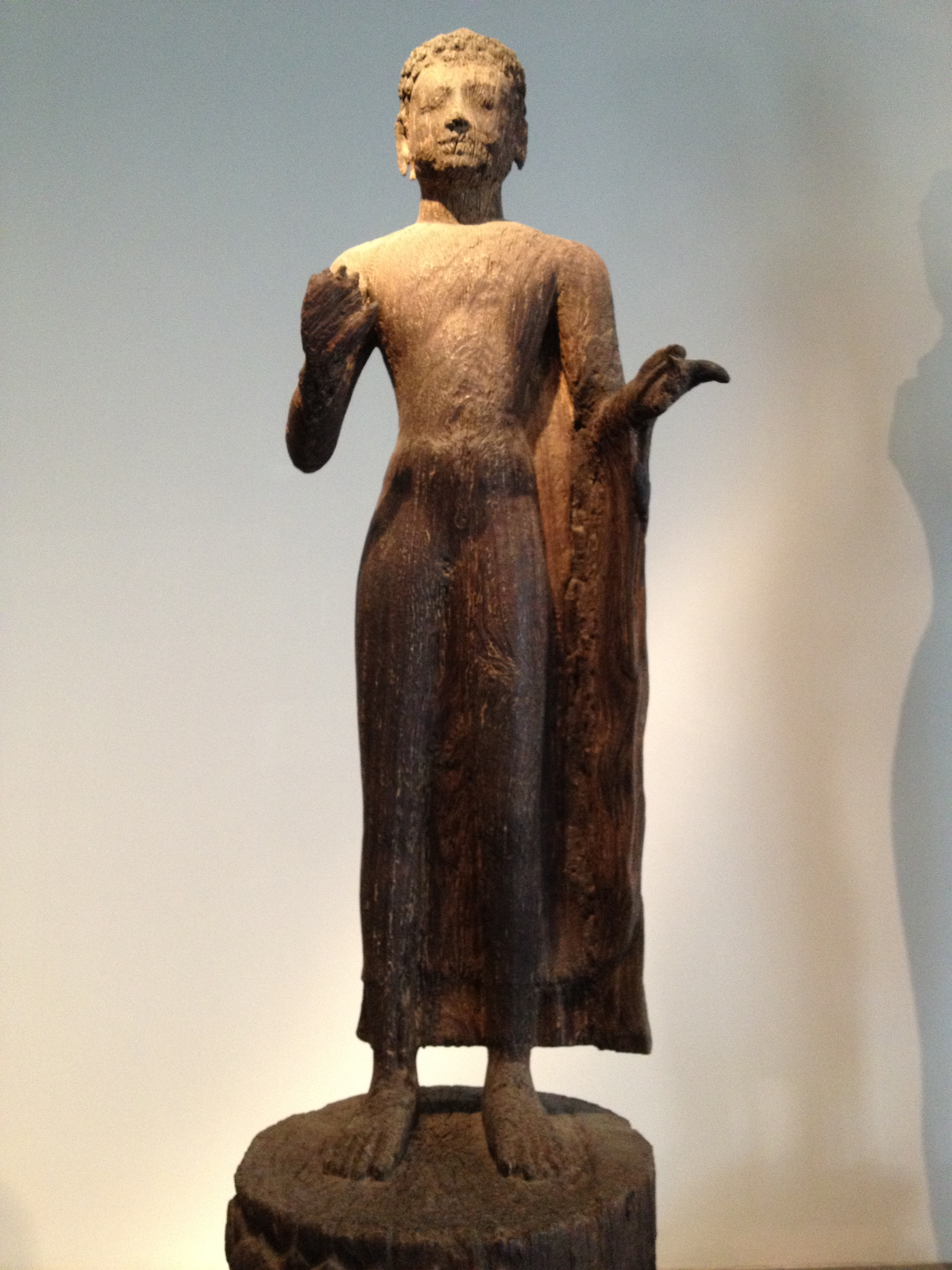
A Chenla-era statue of Buddha found at Binh Hoa, Long An

Most of the Chinese recordings on Chenla, including that of Chenla conquering Funan have been contested since the 1970s as they are generally based on single remarks in the Chinese annals. The History of the Chinese Sui dynasty contains entries of a state called Chenla, a vassal of the Kingdom of Funan, which had sent an embassy to China in 616 or 617, yet under its ruler, Citrasena Mahendravarman, conquered Funan after Chenla had gained independence.

Like its superior Funan, Chenla occupied a strategic position where the maritime trade routes of the Indosphere and the East Asian cultural sphere converged, resulting in prolonged socio-economic and cultural influence and the adoption of the epigraphic system of the south Indian Pallava dynasty and Chalukya dynasty.

The origins of Chenla's aristocracy, whom author Michael Vickery called the "Dângrêk Chieftains", are obscure. These were local principalities north and south of the Dângrêk Mountains, who left behind the oldest known stone epigraphs in the region, bearing genealogical records that suggest increasing political dominance. The first known princes are mentioned in some early inscriptions. The Sanskrit inscription of Vãl Kantél, Stung Treng province names a ruler Vīravarman, who as his name suggests (his father's name was Sārvabhauma) had adopted the idea of divine kingship and deployed the concept of Harihara, a Hindu "god that embodied multiple conceptions of power". His successors continued this tradition, thus conveying the idea of a correlation between political and religious authority.

The New Book of Tang asserts that shortly after 706, the country was split into Land Chenla and Water Chenla. The names signify a northern and a southern half, which may conveniently be referred to as Upper (northern) and Lower (southern) Chenla. By the late 8th century Water Chenla had become dependent on the thalassocratic Shailendra dynasty on Java and the Srivijaya city-state on Sumatra. The last of Water Chenla's kings seems to have been killed and the polity incorporated into the Javanese monarchy around the year 790. Land Chenla maintained its integrity under Jayavarman II, who proclaimed the Khmer Empire in 802.

Originally one of the regional centers of Funan with an unknown degree of sovereignty, Chenla was recognized by a foreign power as a separate political entity at the end of the sixth century, Bhavavarman I its independent ruler. Considerable scholarly discord prevails regarding the exact geographic origin, the extent, dynamic and chronology of territorial expansion and in particular, the religious and political center of Chenla and whether or not it consisted of a unified people under a single leader.

Late 20th century scholars "began cautiously to move away from the established historiographical framework" which had been laid out mainly by George Cœdès, who relies on external sources, specifically the Chinese annals, for its reconstruction. Michael Vickery suggests that ancient authors allocated the name "Chenla" to numerous small principalities and bundled them up as one singular entity in order to classify a larger number of people under the same characteristics, omitting distinctions between individual states. This approach explains why there was a noticeable increase in stone inscriptions during the seventh century. Multiple independent territories would produce their own recordings and written regulations, whereas in one polity only a tiny elite would be allowed access to such tasks.

Before historians had begun to analyse and use epigraphic sources in great numbers, all available evidence supported the idea that the center of the Chenla principality must be located at Mount Phu Kao - Lingaparvata (the mountain of the linga) in Champasak Province, Laos once belonging to the Khmer civilization. The local Vat Phou stele mentions the name of King Devanika (Fan Chen-ch'eng), king of kings - yet researchers do not relate the monarch to the "Dangrek Chieftains". Contrary to the academic conclusions, Cambodian legend tells that "the origin of the kings of Cambodia goes back to the union of the hermit Kambu Svayambhuva, an eponymic ancestor of the Kambujas, with the celestial nymph Mera, who was given to him by Siva." The king Srutavarman was born of this couple, who was followed by his son, king Sreshthavarman. This king gave his name to Sreshthapura - believed to be Vat Phou. At the end of the sixth century, Bhavavarman and Chitrasena (royal title: Mahendravarman) attacked Funan together and subdued it around 627–649.

The obvious fact that Funan and Chenla are "vague concepts" that do not apply to a tribe, a nation or a people is at odds with the Cambodian legends of origin. Folklore follows an unflinching narrative like that of a single ruler such as King Devanika - the reconsecrated maharajadhiraja (king of kings) of Mount Phu Kao where "the people that lived in the region along with the people who came with Devanika, became the forerunners of the prosperous Khmer people".

=== Land and Water Chenla ===
The Tang histories mentioned that after the end of the reign of shénlóng (神龍) (i.e. after 6 February 707) Zhēnlà came to be divided in two realms, Lùzhēnlà (陸真臘) ("Land Chenla", also called Wèndān (文單) or Pólòu (婆鏤)) and Shuīzhēnlà (水真臘) ("Water Chenla") returned to the anarchic state that had existed before it was unified under the kings of Funan and the first kings of Chenla. On the other hand, Water Chenla was associated with the Mekong Delta and had access to the river and its benefits, but this advantage had its downfalls as it made Water Chenla more susceptible to attacks.

Late in the 8th century AD, it faced war from Javanese pirates that ultimately took over the Mekong Delta and then later took over Chenla. However author Michael Vickery asserts that these categories of Water and Land Chenla created by the Chinese are misleading and meaningless because the best evidence shows that until 802 AD, there was no single, great state in the land of ancient Cambodia, but a number of smaller ones.

In the view of the historian Sujit Wongthes, Land Chenla is located in Isan (northeast Thailand), while Water Chenla is situated on the Tonlé Sap area in Cambodia.

=== Decline ===
The number of inscriptions declined sharply during the eighth century. However, some theorists, who have examined the Chinese transcripts, claim that Chenla started falling during the 700s as a result of both internal divisions and external attacks by the Shailendra dynasty of Java, who eventually took over and joined under the Angkor kingdom of Jayavarman II. According to the Sdok Kak Thom inscription (1053), Jayavarman II and his son Indrayudha defeated a Cham army in 790, then moved to north of the Tonle Sap, established the city of Hariharalaya, 15 kilometers south of Angkor.

Individually, historians reject a classical decline scenario, arguing there was no Chenla to begin with, rather a geographic region had been subject to prolonged periods of contested rule, with turbulent successions and an obvious incapability to establish a lasting centre of gravity. Historiography ends this era of nameless upheaval only in the year 802, when Jayavarman II established the appropriately named Khmer Empire.

== Society ==
=== Capital ===
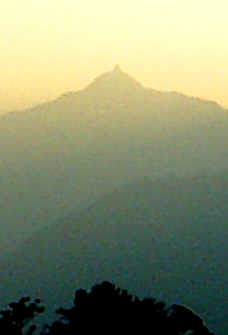
The top of Mount Phu Kao, Laos resembles a lingam

According to George Cœdès, Champasak was the origin of the ruling dynasty of Chenla and Vat Phou its spiritual center. Coedès and contemporary scholars refer to the historical annals of the Sui dynasty, which mention Chenla and identify its royal residence to be near a mountain named Ling-jia-bo-po or Lingaparvata, a temple was constructed on its summit. Vat Phou is an enormously impressive Khmer Hindu temple located at the base of Mount Phu Kao in Laos, which leads theorists to speculate that Phu Kao is the mountain that is referenced in the passage and that Wat Phou could be the temple mentioned; however this view is not accepted by modern scholarship.

Authors Claude Jacques and Michael Vickery question the identification of Phu Kao as Lingjiabopo/Lingaparvata because there are a number of hills in Cambodia that apply to the vague descriptions. Thus, the debate remains and the existence of Chenla as a unitary state or a capital at Vat Phou is questionable. Since there is not much evidence or writings from the time period, not much can be said about the region. The Chinese annals are one of the very few sources scholars can analyze and derive information from.

The people of Chenla, whose base was Champassak in about 550, established their capital city at Isanapura (Sambhupura) by about 600.

According to Paul Pelliot, Sambhupura (Isanapura) was the capital of Land Chenla (Upper Chenla) and Vyadhapura was the capital of Water Chenla (Lower Chenla), but, according to George Coedès, Baladityapura (Aninditapura) was the capital of Water Chenla and Wen Tan (Wen Dan) was Land Chenla.

=== Rulers ===
Traditionally leaders were chosen based on their merit in battle and their ability to attract a large following; however, as rulers gained more power moving away from the commoners horizon, a shift from measure of capability towards patrilineal descent occurred. Adoption of the idea of the Hindu state with its consecrated military leader, the "Varman"—protector king was the ideological basis for control and supremacy.

All essential elements of Bhavavarman's life and most of his descendants are known only through epigraphy. Interpreted as to be Vīravarman's successor and after gaining independence ("he has conquered his throne at the tip of his sword") ruler of the eastern portions of his father's realm, he "built a temple in 598 during his reign in [...] the center of the kingdom of Bhavapura". Mahendravarman is, according to epigraphy, also Vīravarman's son and attributed as to be the conqueror of Funan.

Succession is unclear, because "this at the same time eliminates his son Bhavavarman I of the royal function" Historian Michael Vickery resolves: "Bhavavarman and...Citrasena [Mahendravarman's given name] attacked Funan" [together]. Isanavarman is the founder of a new capital - Isanapura north of the Tonlé Sap (the archaeological site of Sambor Prei Kuk). His son Bhavavarman II - is mentioned only once in an inscription in the year 644. Jayavarman I is the last ruler of a united Chenla. He is the son and successor of the obscure Candravarman.

=== Religion ===
==== Funan legacy ====
During the reign of the Funan empire, residents were still burying their dead with grave goods, but also practicing cremation, according to archaeological finds. Both Hinduism and Buddhism arrived in Southeast Asia through the Funan trade networks. A few surviving inscriptions with verses in Sanskrit and some small statuary and other relics are physical indications of both Buddhist and Hindu belief systems present in Funan culture. The transition from Funan to Chenla is not clearly understood, but by the 6th century CE, the Kingdom of Chenla was established, with Chinese sources suggesting a people speaking the Khmer language conquered Funan and founded Chenla.

==== Royal Hindu and Buddhist cults ====
Archaeological evidence indicates Sambor Prei Kuk (Isanapura) was a major Chenla settlement and possibly the royal capital. The city was divided into three areas, each of which had a brick large sanctuary or temple, apparently centred around a lingam similar to Hindu stone representations of Shiva. Kings of Chenla mentioned in inscriptions generally carry the name of a local Hindu deity with the affix -varman (Sanskrit for "protected by"), such as "Bhavavarman" and "Isanavarman". The kings seem to have undergone a process of Indianization to consolidate and magnify their rule.

A sculpture called Harihara, a combined form of Vishnu and Shiva, is also frequently depicted in religious establishments. This could portray a Chenla belief that there is an equal balance between creation and destruction in the universe and that when one substance is terminated, another is produced to replace it. Other Hindu gods Brahma and Indra along with deities such as Krishna Govardhana, Lakshmi, etc. were also worshipped. An epigraph from Siem Reap Province testified that during the late 8th century, it was evidently that Buddhists in Cambodia worshipped bodhisattvas.

Also originating from India, Buddhism, although not as preeminent as Hinduism, peacefully coexisted with Hinduism in Chenla; two schools of Buddhism were identified from a sculpture found that depicted twelve images of Buddha. This shows that the kings did not seem to enforce their religious views on their people and that influences of all kinds were creating a diverse community in Chenla. According to the Indian historian Himanchu Prabha Ray, Buddhism was an effective motivating factor in the expansion of maritime trading networks from India to eastern lands while Brahmanic Hinduism revolved more around an agrarian economy.

==== Local indigenous deity cults ====
Despite Hinduism and Buddhism apparently playing an important role in royal cults, textual evidence suggests they were only widely practiced by the Chenla elite. Farmers outside the urban centres generally had Khmer names rather than Sanskrit names, and paid tribute to regional landowners carrying the Khmer title poñ, who constructed temples dedicated to both Hindu and local deities. Wealth and power in these outlying agricultural regions was transmitted through the female line of inheritance, indicating matrilineal succession was probably the original norm in Southeast Asia. The local deities worshipped were usually female, and there is also evidence of ancestor worship. Although most of these local temples were built out of wood, and were thus lost, written documents make clear they were the norm in the Kingdom of Chenla. No doubt some locals converted to the new Indian religions, but the vast majority of the population probably venerated the local goddesses and gods and their ancestors in their own villages, while acknowledging the public Hindu and Buddhist cults, such as with occasional sacrifices and attending public ceremonies in Hindu temples in the cities. It's also possible that some local deities were absorbed into the Hindu pantheon. The Chenla kings maintained a liberal religious policy, allowing their subjects to practice their traditional local religions, until the Khmer Empire was established in the early 9th century.

=== Religious structures ===
By the close of the century, the Chenla region was dotted with temples and shrines to the Hindu Gods. Many commoners were involved in the upkeep of these religious complexes and citizens of Chenla were expected to donate land, goods, and slaves to them. The great temple foundations consisted of their own holdings of land and people, functioning as powerful corporations; even minor temples had establishments and collected taxes. While kings had established these temples as a means to increase their power, in reality, these structures might have been taking away valuable land and citizens from the empire; the taxes collected by the temples could have meant more wealth for the leader.

However, these structures may also be factor that stabilized the kingdom and allowed the king to expand and attract more civilians who followed Hindu beliefs as Hinduism served as a reason for people to follow the king's rule. Also, incorporation of these establishments could appeal to foreigners who would bring their trade, business, and goods to the area, making it more economically efficient.

==== Architecture ====
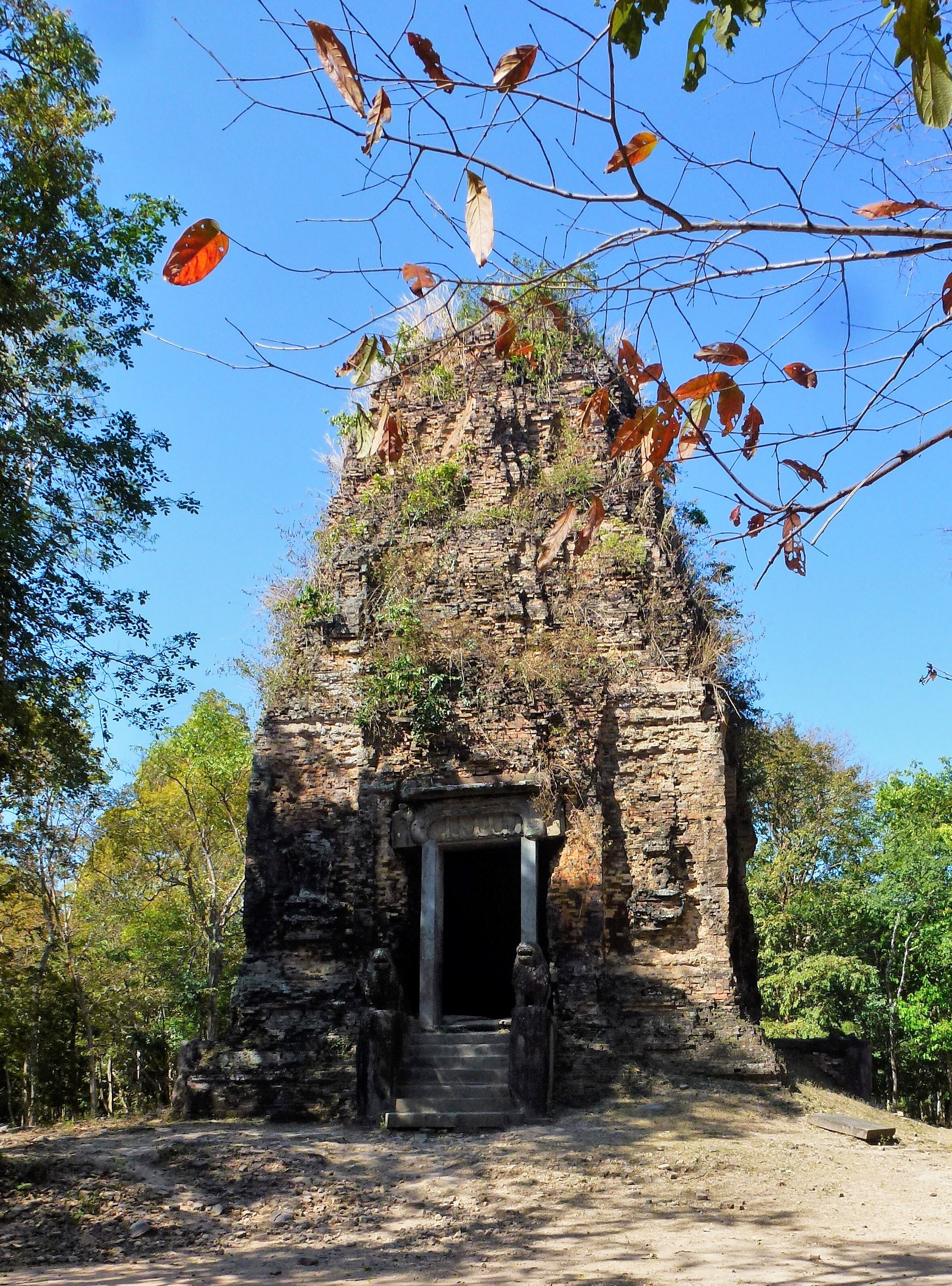
Prasat Boram structure at Sambor Prei Kuk in the ancient capital of Isanapura

The design of the temples and shrines was greatly influenced by the prosperous Gupta state of northern and central India. The temple complexes were brick and stone based with a protruding statue representing a Hindu God or Buddha as the central focus of the building. Sandstone was the prominent material utilized for more important temples and was derived from the Kulen Mountains. Because of its heavy weight, it required a lot of manpower, which usually involved slaves.

Cremation burials lined with bricks were also discovered. These structures are supposed to be devoted to the veneration of members of the Brahmin caste since the burials had been carried out according to Hindu practice.

=== Social hierarchy ===
Social status was determined based on one's knowledge of language, primarily Khmer or Sanskrit. Sanskrit was the language of the Gods, thus it was considered more valuable; the division between who worked the fields and who completed more worthy tasks was based on how well they knew Sanskrit. People who succeeded in educating themselves earned higher ranks such as being an official or even royal servant. However the majority of residents who lacked the ability to gain Sanskrit names spent their lives producing a surplus for the benefit of temples and ancestral Gods.

This depicts the impact Hinduism had on early Cambodian societies. Sanskrit, the language associated with Hinduism, was considered more valuable than the native Khmer language. This may show that the society before Indianization occurred in early South East Asia was unstable and that people latched onto teachings from foreigners because they had no permanent religious or social structures themselves.

Although a social hierarchy existed, there was no discrimination between genders. Women were not considered second class citizens rather many women played central roles in rituals, specialized in crafts, and were given ranks as high officials. This may because until recently, families followed matrilineal heritages instead of a patriarchal society, thus some aspects of the earlier society were retained.

==== Slavery ====
Many commoners were assigned to serve as workers that cleaned, cooked, and built temples and shrines without any compensation. From analyzing ancient inscriptions, Judith Jacob has discovered that there were fourteen categories of slaves in Chenla distinguished by different origins and kinds of duties. These groups of people could be bought, sold, and given away, having no freedom to escape because their parents were in need of money or they had to pay off debts that they contracted or were passed on in their family.

=== Economy ===
The wealth of Chenla and its surrounding territories was derived from wet-rice agriculture and from the mobilization of manpower rather than from subsistence farming such as in the past. Productive lands were donated to temples where slaves worked the fields and helped the temples generate revenue. The kingdom sustained an extensive irrigation system which manufactured rice surpluses that formed the bulk of their trade. International trade is believed to have been essential to the kingdom. But by the time of early 7th century, Cambodian society was in an economic shift from trading orientation to more an agrarian focusing. Trading centers near the coast of Funan period were collapsing, while inland agrarian centers emerged.

In the remains of the main port, Oc Eo, (now in Vietnam) materials from Rome, Greece and Persia have been found, as well as artifacts from India and neighboring states. Indian influences might have been so alluring because Indian merchants who traded with early Cambodians had wealth and were prosperous, qualities to strive for, therefore there was little to no hesitance in adopting the religion of another culture.

== Historiography and Chinese sources ==
It was Īśānavarman I who managed to absorb the ancient territories of Funan which led the New Book of Tang compiled by Ouyang Xiu and Song Qi in 1060 to attribute the effective conquest of the country to him. The earliest known date of the reign of Īśānavarman, a date that must not have been long after his accession, is that of his first embassy to the court of Suí China in 616–17. This king is also known from his own inscriptions, one incised at Īśānapura, dated 13 September 627 AD (K. 604), the other one at Khău Nôy (Thailand), dated 7 May 637 (K. 506).

After Īśānavarman, who ceased to reign around 637, the inscriptions tell us of a king named Bhavavarman (II). The only dated inscriptions we have from him, are that of Tà Kev (K. 79), dated 5 January 644 and of Poñā Hòr south of Tà Kev (K. 21). dated Wednesday, 25 March 655. Then seemingly follows a certain king Candravarman, known from the undated inscription K. 1142 of unknown origin who hailed from the family of Īśānavarman. The son of Candravarman was the famous king Jayavarman I whose earliest inscriptions are from Tûol Kôk Práḥ, province Prei Vêṅ (K. 493) and from Bàsêt, province Bằttaṃbaṅ (K. 447), both dated 14 June 657.

Some 19 or 20 inscriptions dating from his reign have been found in an area extending from Vat Phu'u in the north to the Gulf of Siam in the south. According to the Xīn Táng shū the kingdom of Zhēnlà had conquered different principalities in Northwestern Cambodia after the end of the Chinese era name yǒnghuī (永徽) (i. e. after 31 January 656), which previously (in 638/39) paid tribute to China. The reign of Jayavarman I lasted about thirty years and ended perhaps after 690. It seems that after the death of Jayavarman I (his last known inscription K. 561 is dated 681/82), turmoil came upon the kingdom and at the start of the 8th century, the kingdom broke up into many principalities.

The region of Angkor was ruled by his daughter, Queen Jayadevī who complained in her Western Bàrày inscription K. 904, dated Wednesday, 5 April 713, of "bad times". The Táng histories tell us that after the end of the shénlóng (神龍) era (after 6 February 707) Zhēnlà came to be divided in two realms, Lùzhēnlà (陸真臘) ("Land Zhēnlà", also called Wèndān (文單) or Pólòu (婆鏤)) and Shuīzhēnlà (水真臘) ("Water Zhēnlà") and returned to the anarchic state that had existed before it was unified under the kings of Funan and the first kings of Zhēnlà.

Kings like Śrutavarman and Śreṣṭhavarman or Puṣkarākṣa are only attested very much later in Angkorian inscriptions; their historicity is doubtful. Land Zhēnlà sent an embassy to China in 717, aided Mai Thúc Loan's rebellion against the Chinese (722–723). Another embassy visiting China in 750 came probably from Water Zhēnlà. According to the Chinese Annals a son of the king of Wèndān had visited Chinas in 753 and joined a Chinese army during a campaign against Nanzhao (Chinese: 南詔; pinyin: Nánzhāo) in the following year.

After the Wèndān embassy in the year 771 the heir-apparent Pómí (Chinese: 婆彌) came to the imperial court and, on 13 December 771, he received there the title "Kaifu Yitong Sansi" (Chinese: 開府儀同三司; pinyin: Kāifǔ Yítóng Sānsī), one of the highest honorific titles. In 799 an envoy from Wèndān called Lītóují (Chinese: 李頭及) received a Chinese title, too. As rulers of Śambhupura are attested by the inscription K. 124, dated 803/04 a king Indraloka and three successive queens, Nṛpatendradevī, Jayendrabhā and Jyeṣṭhāryā. Two inscriptions refer to a ruler named Jayavarman: the first one, K. 103, hails from Práḥ Thãt Práḥ Srĕi south of Kompoṅ Čàṃ, dated 20 April 770, the second one from Lobŏ'k Srót in the vicinity of Kračèḥ near Śambhupura (K. 134), dated 781.

Cœdès called him Jayavarman Ibis, but probably he is identical with Jayavarman II, the founding father of the Angkorian kingdom, as Vickery has pointed out: "Not only was Jayavarman II from the South; more than any other known king, he had particularly close links with Vyādhapura. This place is recorded in only one pre-Angkor inscription, K. 109/655 [exactly: 10th February 656], but in 16 Angkor-period texts, the last dated 1069 [K. 449 from Pàlhàl, dated Sunday, 3rd May 1069] ... Two of them, K. 425/968 and K. 449/1069, are explicit records of Jayavarman II taking people from Vyādhapura to settle in Battambang."

== Conflicting records ==
According to the inscription from Čăn Năk'ôn in Basăk/Laos (K. 363) Vīravarman was the father of Citrasena (royal title Mahendravarman) who was the younger brother of Bhavavarman. Obviously both princes had the same mother, but different fathers, which was corroborated by the Si Tep inscription (in present-day Thailand) giving the information that Bhavavarman was the son of a Prathivīndravarman and grandson of a Cakravartin whereas the inscription from Pak Mun in Ubon/Thailand informs us that the name of the father of Vīravarman was called Sārvabhauma.

All these inscriptions refer to a large territory ruled by these kings. It is recorded in the inscription from Robaṅ Romãs at Īśānapura (the archaeological site of Sambor Prei Kuk) that a certain Narasiṃhagupta, who was vassal (samāntanṛpa) of the successive kings Bhavavarman, Mahendravarman (the ruling name of Citrasena) and Īśānavarman erected on 13 April 598 during the reign of Bhavavarman a figure of Kalpavāsudeva (Vishnu).

This coincides with the oldest Chinese text that mentions Chenla, the Suí shū (Annals of the Suí Dynasty), compiled by Wèi Zhēng (580–643) in AD 636, which gives the information that at the beginning of the 7th century Chenla was ruled by Citrasena and Īśānavarman. The capital of the latter was Īśānapura, while his predecessor Bhavavarman I still resided at Bhavapura, a place which probably is located in the vicinity of the modern town of Thala Barivat (13°33′ N, 105°57′ E). An inscription dating from the reign of Isanarvarman I asserts that he was "the King of Kings, who rules over Suvarnabhumi as far as the sea" [Samudra-paryanta Suvarṇabhūmi], thus identifying Chenla with Suvarnabhumi.

== List of rulers ==
Ruler	Reign	Period	Ref.
Srutavarman	c. 550–555	Unified Chenla	
Sreshthavarman	c. 555–560	Unified Chenla	
Vīravarman	c. 560–575	Unified Chenla	
Kambuja-raja-lakshmi	c. 575–580	Unified Chenla	
Bhavavarman I	c. 580–600	Unified Chenla	
Mahendravarman	c. 600–616	Unified Chenla	
Isanavarman I	c. 616–635	Unified Chenla	
Bhavavarman II	c. 639–657	Unified Chenla	
Jayavarman I	c. 657–681	Unified Chenla	
Jayadevi	c. 681–713	Unified Chenla	
Pushkaraksha	c. 713–730	Separation Period (Land and Water Chenla)	
Shambhuvarman	c. 730–760	Separation Period (Land and Water Chenla)	
Rajendravarman I	c. 760–770	Separation Period (Land and Water Chenla)	
Mahipativarman	c. 770–780	Separation Period (Land and Water Chenla)	
Jayavarman II	c. 780–802	Separation Period (Land and Water Chenla)	
