= Vyadhapura =

Ancient city of the Funan civilization

- វ្យាធបុរៈ (Khmer)
- Location in Cambodia
- 11.256299°N 105.401051°E
- Periods: Middle Ages
- Location: Ba Phnum District, Prey Veng
- Region: Southeast Asia

History
- Built: late 2nd century AD
- Built by: Hun P'an-huang
- Abandoned: 618 AD

Site notes
- Architectural styles: Angkor Borei, Phnom Da, and Phnom Chisor
- Condition: restored and ruined
- Public access: Yes

Vyadhapura (Khmer: វ្យាធបុរៈ, Sanskrit: व्याधपूर Vyādhapūra) was an ancient city of the Funan civilization, likely in what is now Ba Phnum District in the province of Prey Veng, Cambodia.

== History ==
Vyadhapura, the city of the hunter king, named in honour of Hun P'an-huang. It was the capital of the Kingdom of Funan early in its history, located near the Funan's sacred mountain of Ba Phnom. Chinese reports indicated that it was about 193.12 km or 120 miles from the sea.

According to Paul Pelliot, Sambhupura (Isanapura) was the capital of Land Chenla (Upper Chenla) and Vyadhapura was the capital of Water Chenla (Lower Chenla), but, according to George Coedès, Baladityapura (Aninditapura) was the capital of Water Chenla and Wen Tan (Wen Dan) was Land Chenla.
