= Mahendravarman (Chenla) =

Mahendravarman I មហេន្ទ្រវរ្ម័នទី១
- King of Chenla
- Reign: 600-615
- Predecessor: Bhavavarman I
- Successor: Isanavarman I
- Born: Bhavapura
- Died: 0611
- Issue: Isanavarman I
Names
- Mahendravarman
- House: Chenla
- Dynasty: Varman
- Father: Viravarman; Sarvabhauma (grandfather)

Mahendravarman (Khmer: មហេន្ទ្រវរ្ម័ន, vraḥ kamrateṅ añ Śrī Mahendravarmma in Pre-Angkorian Khmer: វ្រះកម្រតេង៑អញ៑ឝ្រីមហេន្ទ្រវម៌្ម; also titled Citrasena, Khmer: ចិត្រសេន Chinese: 摩訶陀羅跋摩; pinyin: Móhètuóluóbamó) was also called Protégé of the Great Indra.

== Biography ==
Mahendravarman was a king of the kingdom of Chenla, modern day Cambodia, during the 6th century. Chenla was the direct predecessor of the Khmer empire. Citrasena was a close relative of Bhavavarman I (Khmer: ភវវរ្ម័នទី១), whom he joined to conquer the Kingdom of Funan, and whom he succeeded as king and adopting the name Mahendravarman. After Bhavavarman's death, Mahendravarman took residence in the capital at Sambor Prei Kuk while the same time Hiraṇyavarman (Khmer: ហិរណ្យវរ្ម័ន) was ruling Cambodia.

Mahendravarman sent an ambassador to Champa to "ensure friendship between the two countries."

After the death of Mahendravarman, his son Īśānavarman (Khmer: ឦសានវរ្ម័ន, Pre-Angkorian Khmer: ឦឝានវម៌្ម) had taken the control of the kingdom, where his father ruled for several years. He ruled the kingdom until 628 before dying in 639.

== Sons of Īśānavarman ==
1. Śivadatta Khmer: ឝិវទត្ត, mod. Khmer: សិវទត្ត
2. Īsvarakumāra Khmer: ឦឝ្វរកុមារ, mod. Khmer: ឦស្វរកុមារ or ឥសូរកុមារ
3. Yuvarāja Khmer: យុវរាជ) (Crown Prince) - Name not identified from historical records

Preceded by Bhavavarman I	king of Chenla; 600-616	Succeeded by Isanavarman I
