= Ba Phnum District =

Ba Phnum បាភ្នំ
- District
- Ba Phnum District ស្រុកបាភ្នំ
- Location in Cambodia
- Coordinates: 11°14′N 105°22′E
- Country: Cambodia
- Province: Prey Veng

Population (1998)
  - Total: 71,662
- Time zone: UTC+7 (ICT)
- Geocode: 1401

Ba Phnum (Khmer: បាភ្នំ, pronounced [baːpʰnum]), sometime spelled as Ba Phnom, is a district located in Prey Veng Province, in south eastern Cambodia. The hills surrounding the town are the highest elevation points in Prey Veng province. In Khmer, Ba means "ancestor" and Phnum means "hill." When combined, the town is known as "Hill of the Ancestors."

Ba Phnum is a relatively remote location and has been attractive to ascenti monks (loak dhutang) for centuries. It has also been an occasional center from which millennial movements have radiated throughout Khmer history.

Ba Phnum is a site of interest for Cambodian historians. According to some accounts, the area is the birthplace of the Khmer people. An inscription on Wat Jaan, the pre-Angkorian temple at the base of the mountain (ca. 629 AD), associates Ba Phnum with Shiva and refers to it as "the holy mountain."

Ba Phnum was prominently featured in many of the rural scenes in the 2016 documentary Angkor Awakens.

Human sacrifices were made here until 1872. Khmer Kings made pilgrimage here.

== Ba Phnum District ==
Ba Phnum contains 9 Communes (ឃុំ Khum) and 108 Villages (ភូមិ Phum).

No.	Name	Khmer	Geo Code	No. Villages
1	Boeng Preah	បឹងព្រះ	14-01-01	14
2	Cheung Phnum	ជើងភ្នំ	14-01-02	7
3	Chheu Kach	ឈើកាច់	14-01-03	14
4	Reaks Chey	រក្សជ័យ	14-01-04	12
5	Roung Damrei	រោងដំរី	14-01-05	12
6	Sdau Kaong	ស្ដៅកោង	14-01-06	15
7	Spueu Ka	ស្ពឺ ក	14-01-07	10
8	Spueu Kha	ស្ពឺ ខ	14-01-08	6
9	Theay	ធាយ	14-01-09	18

== Funan's capital city ==
Ba Phnum has purportedly been the location of Vyadhapura, capital of the kingdom of Funan.
