= Bhavavarman II =

King of Chenla from 639 to 657

King of Chenla
- Reign: 639–657 AD
- Predecessor: Isanavarman I
- Successor: Jayavarman I
- Died: 657
- Issue: Jayavarman I
- Dynasty: Varman
- Religion: Hindu

Bhavavarman II (Khmer: ព្រះបាទភវវរ្ម័នទី២ ) Chinese: 撥婆跋摩; pinyin: Bópóbámó) was King of the Chenla Kingdom, predecessor polity of the Khmer Empire, from 639 to 657.

== Biography ==
King Bhavavarman II reigned shortly from 639 to 657 AD between Isanavarman I and Jayavarman I. He was of unknown origin, neither the son nor the approved successor to Isanavarman I. He was the successor to the throne from King Isanvarman I (Khmer: ឦសានវម៌្មទី១), but there is no evidence as to whether he was the son of Ishavarman I. Scholars speculate that he may have been one of the princes in the royal family or was one of the sons of Issavaraman I, which still has no consensus on this assumption. He made many inscriptions, but none of them mentioned his history.

Some scholars have suggested that Bhavavarman, identified in the Ban Wang Pai inscription (K. 978) discovered in Phetchabun Province, Thailand, as the son of Prathivindravarman, the ruler of Dvaravati Si Thep, should be identified with Bhavavarman II rather than Bhavavarman I (r. 580–598). This interpretation is based on palaeographic and stylistic features of the inscription, which indicate that it was likely composed after 627 CE. This hypothesis is consistent with interpretations concerning the origins of Bhavavarman II's successor, Jayavarman I, who is described as the son of Chandravarman. Chandravarman (旃陀越摩) has been identified in Chinese sources as the ruler of Gān Bì, a polity that maintained dynastic relations with Xiū Luó Fēn and Gē Luó Shě Fēn (the expanded Si Thep) within the Dvaravati sphere. However, according to the undated Wat Kut Tae Inscription (K. 1150), Bhavavarman II was a younger brother of Śivadatta of Jyeṣṭhapura (Prasat Mueang Phai ปราสาทเมืองไผ่), who was an elder son of Isanavarman I.

In this period, the Chinese leishu, Cefu Yuangui and the Book of Sui say that Chenla and the Zhū Jiāng Kingdom, one of the Dvaravati polities, who allied via royal intermarriage, wage wars against Tou Yuan to the northwest, and successfully made it a vassal of Dvaravati in 647.

When King Bhavavarman II died, King Jayavarman I, his son, succeeded to the throne. When King Jayavarman I died without a male heir, his granddaughter, Jayadevi, ascended to the throne. During this time, the Chenla was in full swing with political turmoil, and her reign was disputed, leading to the division of the state of Upper Chenla and Lower Chenla.

Preceded by Isanavarman I	King of Chenla; 639–657 AD	Succeeded by Jayavarman I
