= Isanapura =

Historical capital of Chenla

- ឦសានបុរៈ (Khmer)
- Location in Cambodia
- 12.871°N 105.043°E
- Periods: Middle Ages
- Location: Kampong Thom, Cambodia
- Region: Southeast Asia

History
- Built: 618 AD
- Built by: Isanavarman I
- Abandoned: late 9th century AD

Site notes
- Architectural style: Sambor Prei Kuk
- Condition: restored and ruined
- Public access: Yes

Isanapura (Khmer: ឦសានបុរៈ), also known as Sambhupura (Khmer: សម្ភុបុរៈ) or Sambor of St'ung Sen, was the capital of the ancient kingdom of Chenla. It is located in what is now Kampong Thom Province in Cambodia. The city was founded in about 618 at Leek Sambor Kuk by King Isanavarman I.

Identification by Isanapura took place in the late nineteenth and early twentieth centuries, with the first preliminary study conducted in 1912. The first comprehensive recognition of a city by Henri Parmentier in 1927, working for the École Française d’Extrême-Orient (EFEO). Since preliminary studies were first undertaken, a total of 23 inscriptions have been found at Sambor Prei Kuk.

The naming of Isanapura is contested among scholars. George Coedes initially believed Bhavapura to be in central southern Laos, shifting later on to believe the site Ampu Rolu’m was instead Bhavapura. Claude Jacques argues that the site of Sambor Prei Kuk was in fact Bhavapura. Michael Vickery argues that this is unlikely, but it is probable that Bhavapura is indeed close to Isanapura, given inscriptional evidence that references both Isanapura and Bhavapura as separate entities.

Today, the site of old Isanapura contains the ruins of 150 temples and buildings, which are a few centuries older than that of the Khmer Empire around Angkor Wat. During the Vietnam War, some of these temples were completely destroyed by US bombers. Further damage was done by vandals, dealers in old relics, and the Khmer Rouge. Many temples have been overgrown by the jungle.

== Archaeology ==
The site is divided into the temple grounds in the east and the urban centre to the west. The temple grounds are primarily in 3 main clusters, North, Central and South, with some outlying temples that sit outside of the temple groups. Each of the three groups is dedicated to Hindu deities and is surrounded by two walled, non-concentric, rectangular enclosures. The city in the west is surrounded by a moat measuring 2 km, surrounding the city on three sides, except for the east side, which is bordered by the seasonal O Krue Ke river. The city itself comprises various shrines, moats, and reservoirs on a smaller scale compared to the religious complexes. Subsequent topographic data based on LIDAR scans suggests a 4x4 grid pointing to a planned layout. An inferred linear feature is believed to be a hydrological feature such as a moat or canal measuring a total of 20 metres in width, consistent with descriptions provided in the Book of Sui about the so called “Great Hall”, it extends eastward from the centre point of the grid towards the religious complex. Description of the urban layout of Isanapura is also recorded in the Book of Sui, mentioning the western urban centre and the religious complexes located in the east, which thus far match the observations of ongoing archaeological excavation and research.

The northern group, Prasat Sambor, is believed to be the oldest site at Sambor Prei Kuk, with the oldest stage of construction believed to be at the end of the 6th century. Most construction at Prasat Sambor took place during the reign of Isanavarman I and his successor Bhavavarman II in the 7th century. The majority of construction at Prasat Sambor and other groups dates to around the 7th century, likely as a result of Isanavarman I centralisation of power, with Isanapura being his capital and Bhavavarman II construction efforts affirming its continuing status of importance, whether or not the capital had in fact been moved to Bhavapura at this point. Later dates from two inscriptions suggest activity, either a revival or continued worship at Prasat Sambor, took place until the 10th or 11th century, given the refoundation of a temple at this time.

The central group, Prasat Tao, is dated to the late 7th to the late 8th or early 9th centuries. Consistent with the other groups, the central sanctuary was raised on a platform reached via a flight of stairs. Carved Lions guard the immediate access to the temple terrace. The sanctuary itself measures 14 by 14 metres with a thickness of 2.8 metres. Aerial reconnaissance conducted in 1937 by Victor Goloubew revealed that the sanctuaries are set within a double walled enclosure measuring 2x2 kilometres. Relative dating of the site itself is difficult due to the lack of evidence, both from the absence of inscriptions and the inscriptions found at Prasat Tao to date. The central shrine of Prasat Tao is believed to have been constructed later, given the implementation of early 9th century Angkor styles. However, it is more likely that the construction was simultaneous with Prasat Yeai Poeun and was finished later.

The southern group, Prasat Yeai Poeun, was built during the 7th century, as per 10 inscriptions found, with a specific date of 627 AD on a Linga inscription construction started in the reign of Isanavarman I. The majority of the lintels at Prasat Yeai Poeun are of the Sambor Prei Kuk style and point towards most construction taking place during a relatively short time frame, with only a few outliers of other styles having been found. It is speculated that building at Prasat Yeai Poeun was undertaken continuously from the end of Isanavarman II’s reign to his successor, Bhavavarman II.

Recent surveys conducted in the western portion of Sambor Prei Kuk have identified the “Great Hall”, believed to be described in the Book of Sui. The geographic position of the site, located centrally within the identified grid plan, is consistent with that described in Sui records. LiDAR scans and excavations revealed laterite and brick remains of a terrace-like structure running 70 metres north to south and 15 metres east to west, which was subsequently identified along with laterite masonry walls 2.1 metres in height. Square bases of brick spaced at 1.5 metre intervals on all four cardinal directions suggest possible bases for wooden supports and beams. However, the absence of wood and damage to surviving brickwork lacks the supporting evidence to confirm this without any doubt. LiDAR identification of brick structures is spatially arranged, such as the excavation site itself, which is the central point surrounded by these buildings. A cluster of buildings to the east of the terrace may have been guard buildings and associated structures mentioned in the Book of Sui. Radiocarbon dating on the surrounding structures dates their construction to coincide with both Isanavarman I and Bhavavarman II. Other charcoal samples have been radiocarbon dated to the earliest in the early 5th century and the latest in the 13th to 15th centuries, supporting the belief in long term utilisation of the city.
