= Jayavarman I =

7th-century king of Chenla

- Jayavarman I ជ័យវរ្ម័នទី១

King of Chenla
- Reign: c. 657 – 681
- Predecessor: Bhavavarman II
- Successor: Jayadevi
- Died: 681
- Issue: Queen Jayadevi; Princess Sobhajaya
- Father: Candravarman

Jayavarman I (Khmer: ជ័យវរ្ម័នទី១), also called Protégé of Victory, is considered to be the last ruler of the united Chenla, the predecessor polity of the Khmer Empire.

== Biography ==
He ruled from approximately 657 until around 681. Over the course of his reign, and that of his predecessors Bhavavarman II and Candravarman, the Khmer kings power was consolidated in the areas previously controlled by the Funan’s culture. However, Jayavarman left no male heirs, which led to the division of Cambodia.

Jayavarman I is described as the son of Chandravarman (旃陀越摩), who is mentioned in Chinese sources as the ruler of Gān Bì, a polity that maintained dynastic relations with Xiū Luó Fēn and Gē Luó Shě Fēn (the expanded Si Thep) within the Dvaravati sphere.

Inscriptions associated with his reign are found at Tuol Kok Prah, Wat Prei Val, Prah Kuha Luon, Wat Kdei Ang, Wat Baray, and Tuol Nak Ta Bak Ka. His palace was located at Purandarapura. He was the great-grandson of Isanavarman I. Jayavarman I's daughter, Queen Jayadevi, succeeded him as queen regnant.

== See also ==
- Jayavarman II - considered by most to be the first king of the Khmer Angkor kingdom, ruling at the beginning of the 9th century.

| Preceded by Bhavavarman II | King of Chenla; 657–690 | Succeeded by Queen Jayadevi |
