= Sambor Prei Kuk =

Archaeological site in Cambodia

- សំបូរព្រៃគុហ៍ (Khmer) (Khmer)
- Isanapura
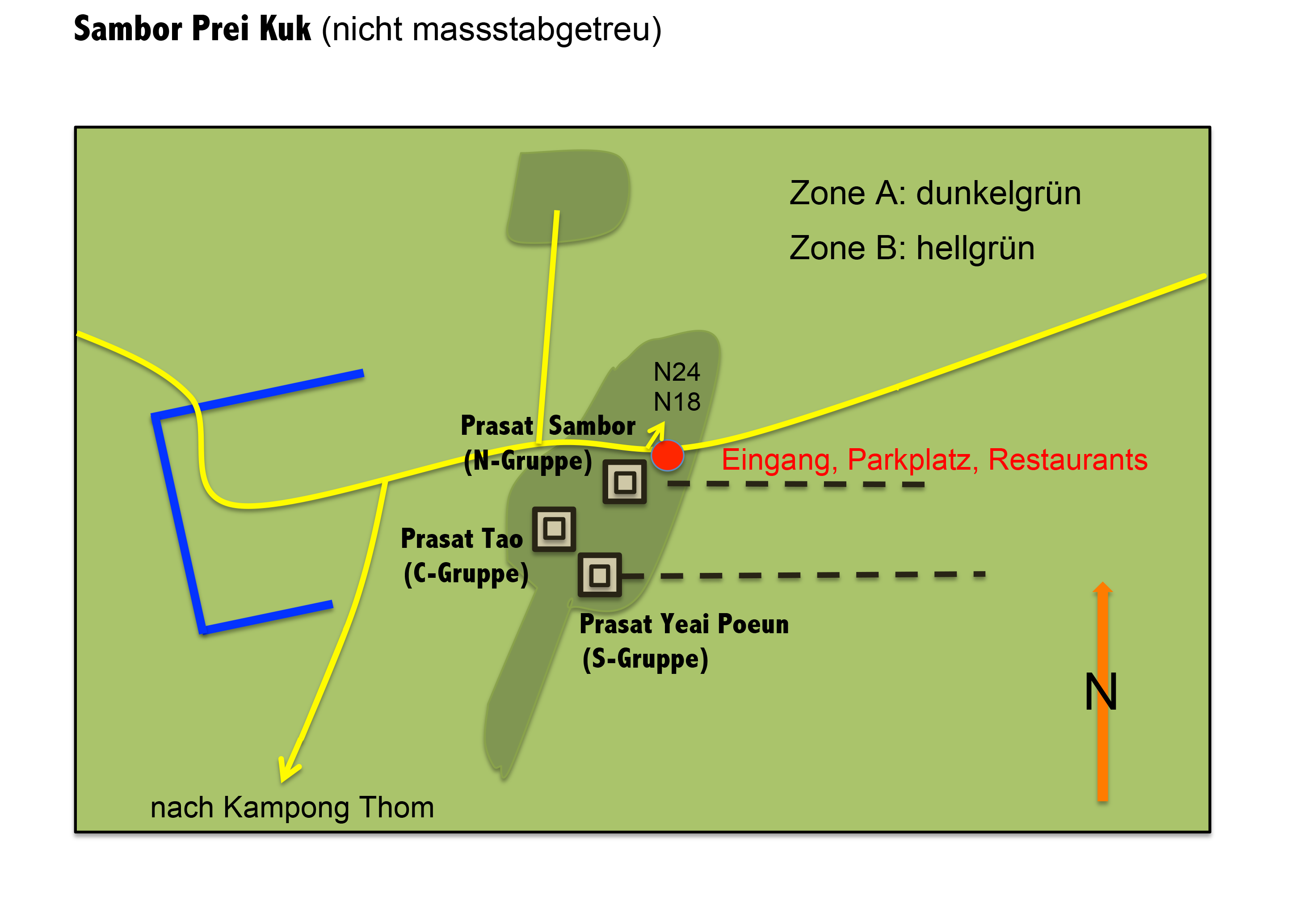
- Map of the Sambor Prei Kuk site
- Interactive map of Sambor Prei Kuk
- 12°52′15″N 105°2′35″E
- Periods: Middle Ages
- Location: Kampong Thom Province, Cambodia
- Region: Southeast Asia

History
- Built: 7th century
- Built by: Isanavarman I

UNESCO World Heritage Site
- Official name: Temple Zone of Sambor Prei Kuk, Archaeological Site of Ancient Isanapura
- Type: Cultural
- Criteria: ii, iii, vi
- Designated: 2017 (41st session)
- Reference no.: 1532
- Region: Southeast Asia

Sambor Prei Kuk (Isanapura) (Khmer: សំបូរព្រៃគុហ៍, Sâmbor Prey Kŭh [sɑmboː prəj kuʔ]) is an archaeological site in Cambodia located in Kampong Thom Province, 30 km (19 mi) north of Kampong Thom, the provincial capital, 176 km (109 mi) east of Angkor and 206 km (128 mi) north of Phnom Penh. The now ruined complex dates back to the Pre-Angkorian Chenla Kingdom (late 6th to 9th century), established by king Isanavarman I as central royal sanctuary and capital, known then as "Isanapura" (Khmer: ឦសានបុរៈ, Eisanbŏreă [ʔəjsaːnɓoreaʔ]). In 2017, Sambor Prei Kuk was declared a UNESCO World Heritage Site.

Located on the Eastern bank of the Tonle Sap lake, close to the Steung Saen River, the central part of Sambor Prei Kuk is divided into three main groups. Each group has a square layout surrounded by a brick wall. The structures of the overall archaeological area were constructed at variable times: the southern and north groups (7th century) by Isanavarman I, who is considered a possible founder of the city and the central group (later date). The buildings of Sambor Prei Kuk are characteristic of the Pre-Angkorean period with a simple external plan. The principal material is brick, but sandstone is also used for certain structures. Architectural features include numerous prasats, octagonal towers, shiva lingams and yonis, ponds and reservoirs, and lion sculptures. Sambor Prei Kuk is located amidst mature sub-tropical forests with limited undergrowth. The area has been mined and could still contain unexploded ordnance.

== Clusters ==
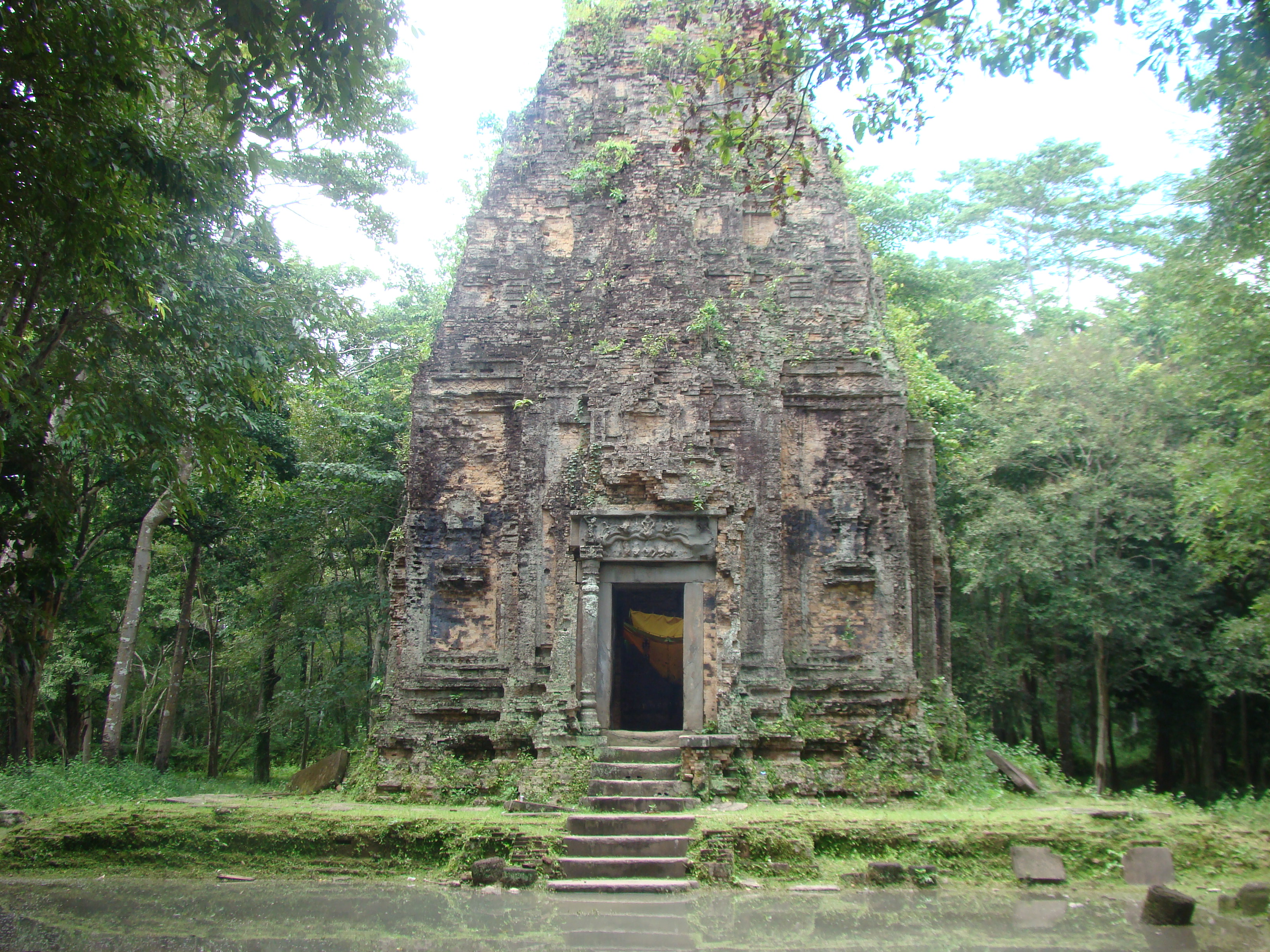
A temple in Sambor Prei Kuk

The whole compound is made of three clusters classified as group C for Central, N for North and S for South (Michon & Kalay, 2012). They are enclosed in a double-walled encircling 1,000 acre in which there were 150 Hindu temples today mostly in ruins.

1. Group N: Prasat Sambor (ប្រាសាទសំបូរ) is considered the main temple and it dates from the 7th century. It was dedicated to one of the reincarnations of Shiva known as Gambhireshvara (from Sanskrit गम्भीर - gambhir, profound, deep, solemn - and शिव, shvara, Shiva, Śiva, The Auspicious One).
2. Group S: Prasat Yeah Puon (ប្រាសាទយាយព័ន្ធ) includes 22 sanctuaries dated from the 7th century (600 - 635 AD) during the reign of Isanavarman I in dedication to Shiva.
3. Group C: It is occupied by the Central Sanctuary or Prasat Boram (ប្រាសាទបុរាម) with lion sculptures that had inspired the popular name of Prasat Tao (The Lions' Temple). It is, however, the newest group dating the 9th century. The other main feature is the Tower of Ashram Issey, but there were also other constructions (18 temples) now in ruined (Palmer, 2011).

== History ==
=== 7th century ===
Isanavarman I reigned over the Chenla Kingdom between 616 and 637 AD, taking Isanapura as his capital and it is argued that he built the main temple Prasat Sambor (Group N), as there is an inscription on the site attributed to his reign and dated 13 September 627 AD. The king is also known for sending his first embassy to the court of the Sui dynasty in China (616-617). Chenla conquered different principalities in the Northwest of Cambodia after the end of the Chinese reign period yǒnghuī (永徽) (i. e. after 31 January 656), which previously (in 638/39) paid tribute to China. An inscription dating from the reign of Isanarvarman I claimed that he was, "the King of Kings, who rules over Suvarnabhumi". Vong Sotheara, of the Royal University of Phnom Penh, claimed that the inscription would "prove that Suvarnabhumi was the Khmer Empire."

The last important king in Isanapura was Jayavarman I, whose death caused turmoil to the kingdom at the start of the 8th century, breaking it in many principalities and opening the way to a new time: Angkor. This site is also claimed as an early capital of Jayavarman II (O'Reilly & Jacques, 1990).

=== 20th century ===
After the Lon Nol's coup d'état to Prince Norodom Sihanouk in 1970, US President Richard Nixon ordered a secret bombing of Cambodia to fight the Khmer Rouge guerrillas and any influence of North Vietnam in the country. The US aircraft bombed positions inside the archaeological site, causing craters near the temples, while the guerrillas left several mines on the land that were cleared only in 2008.

This site was added to the UNESCO World Heritage list on 8 July 2017.

== Gallery ==
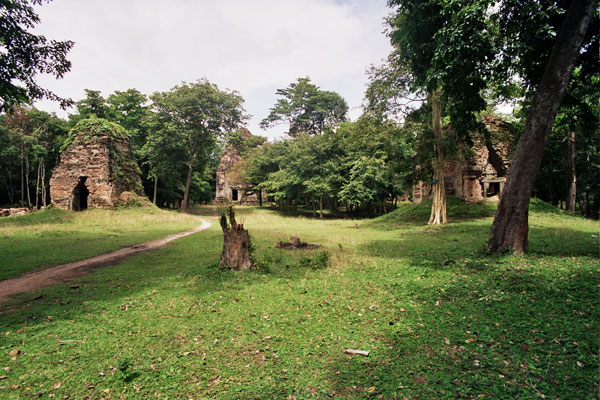
Group C and Prasat Boram or Prasat Tao.

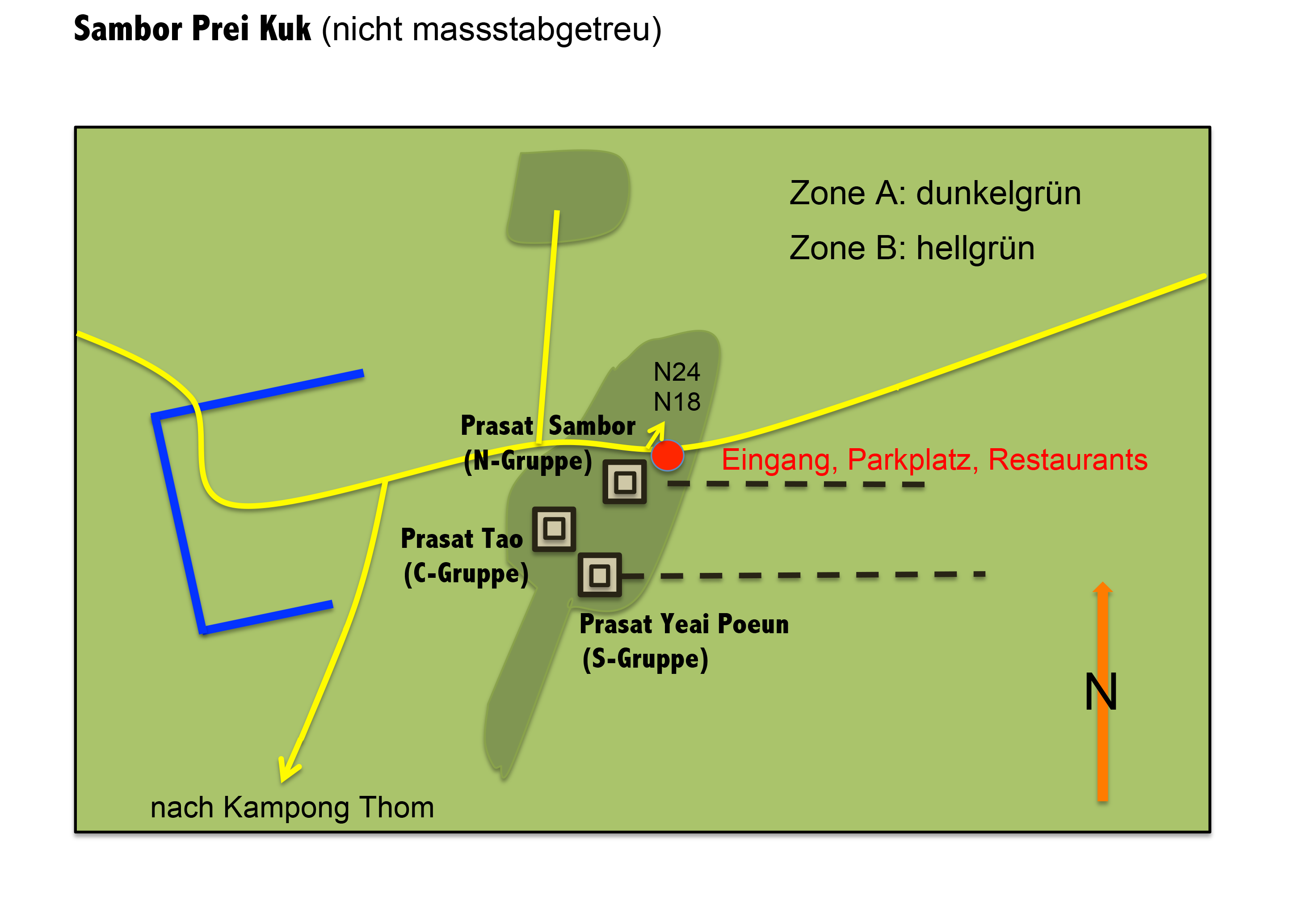
Map of the Clusters.

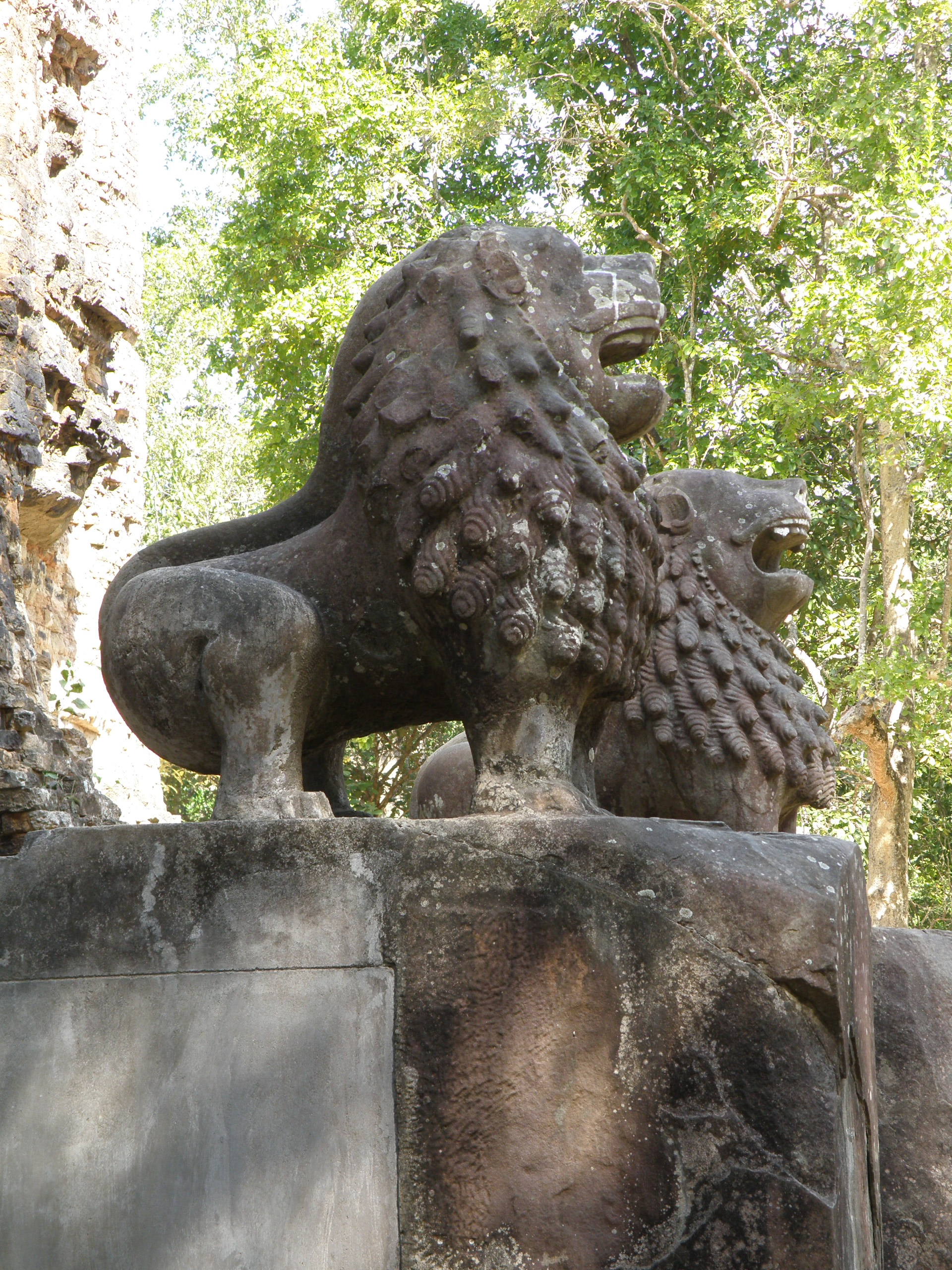
The two lions at Prasat Boram.

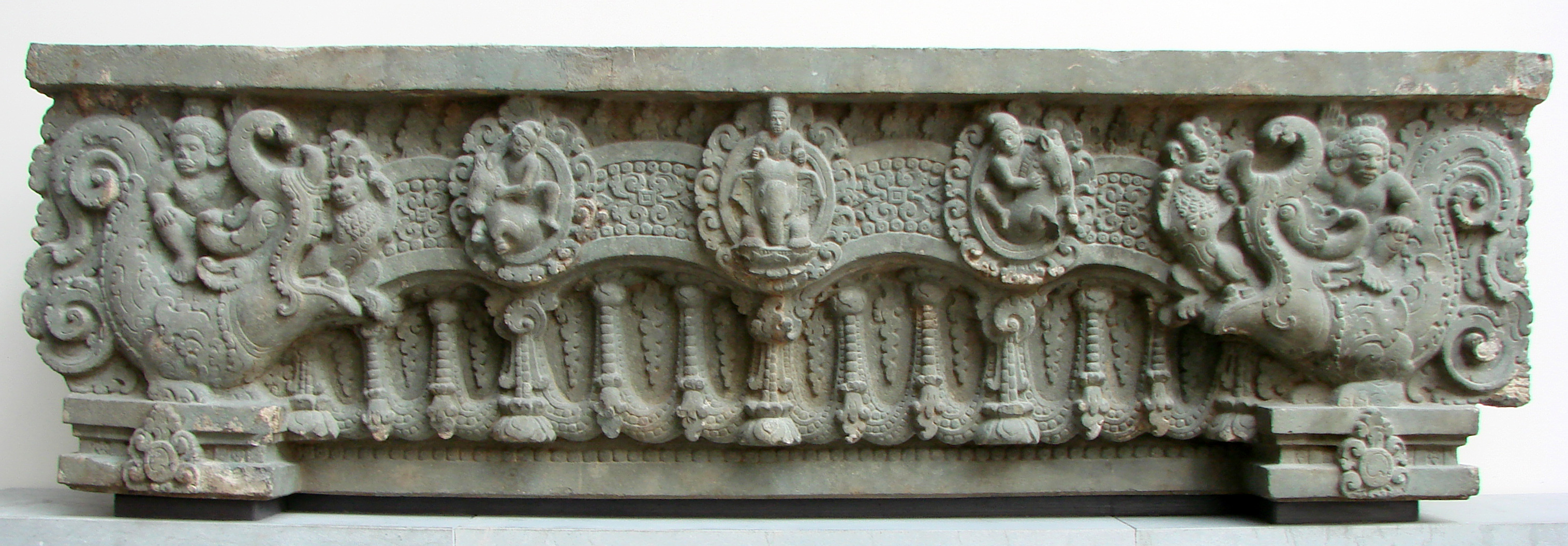
Lintel from Sambo Prei Kuk at Guimet Museum, Paris.

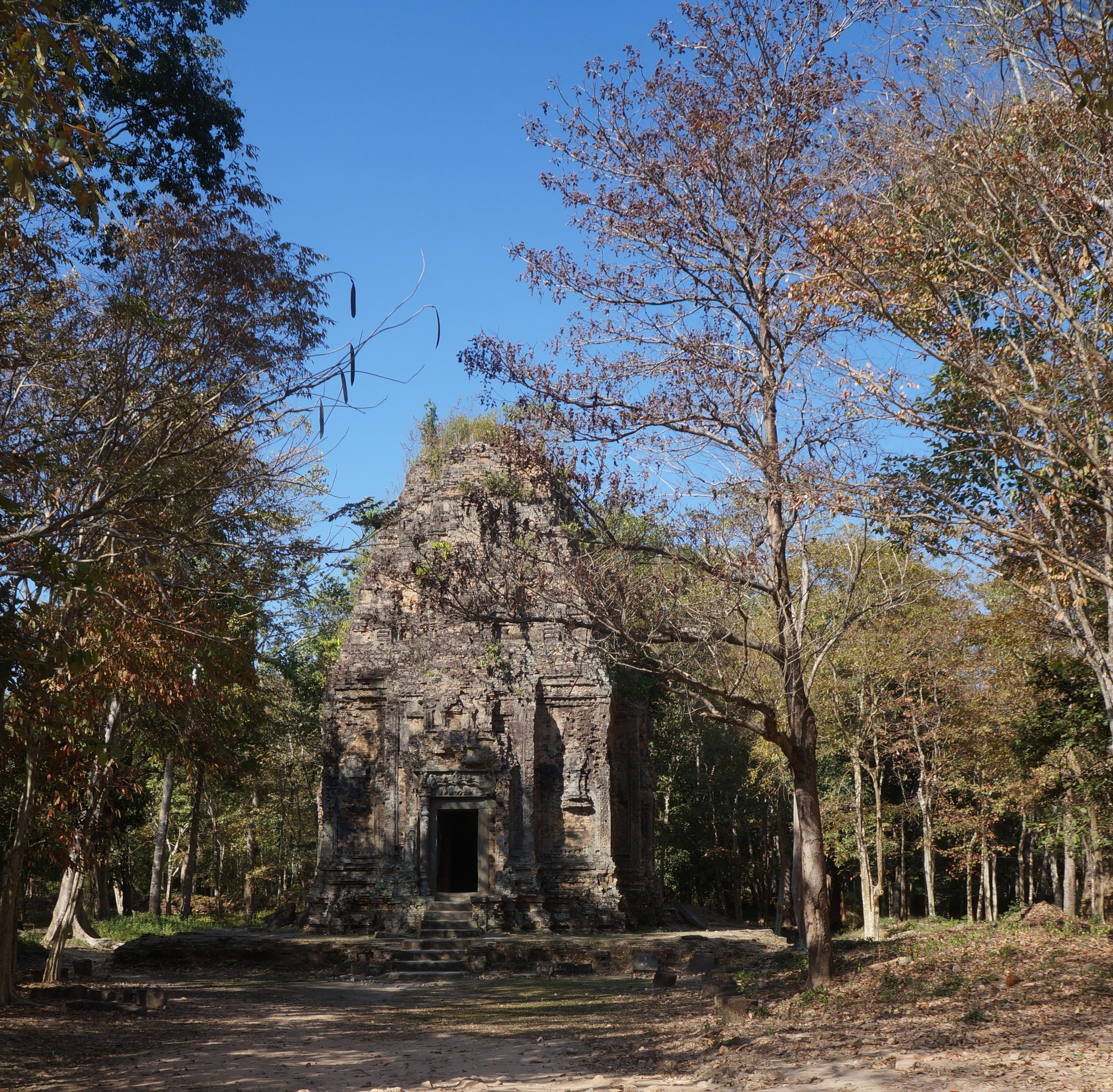
Yeai Poeun Temple.

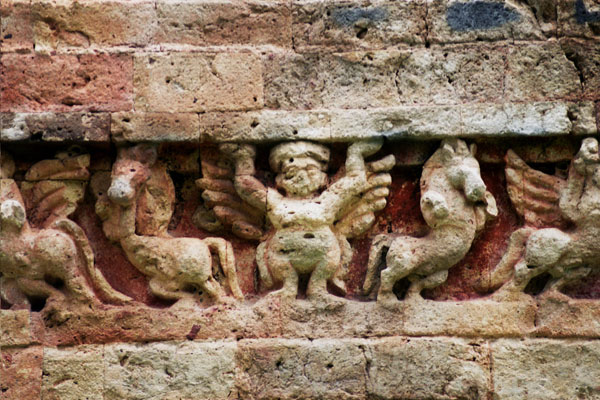
Temple N7.

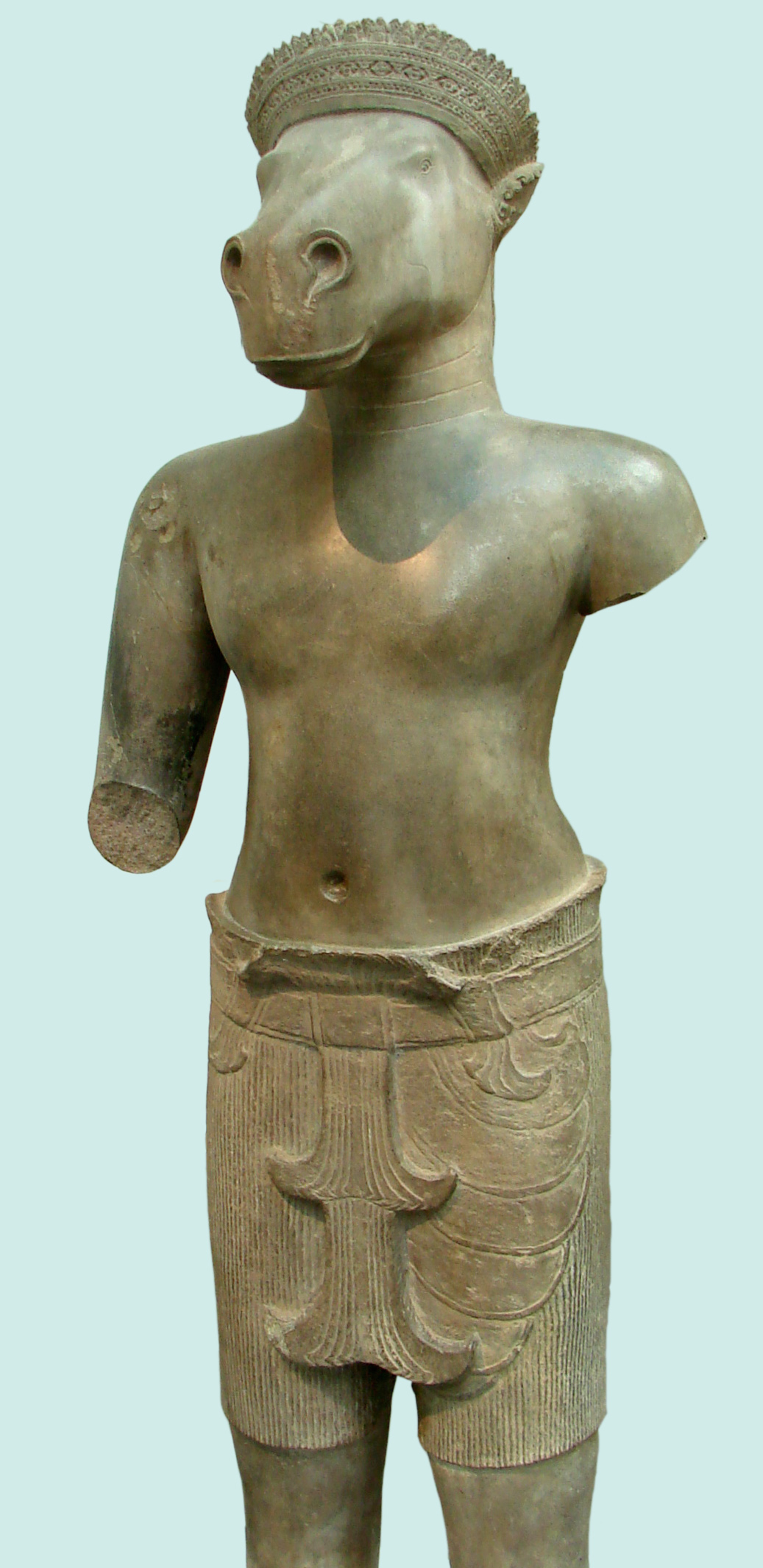
Vajimukha (horse-headed deity) from temple N7 at the Guimet Museum.

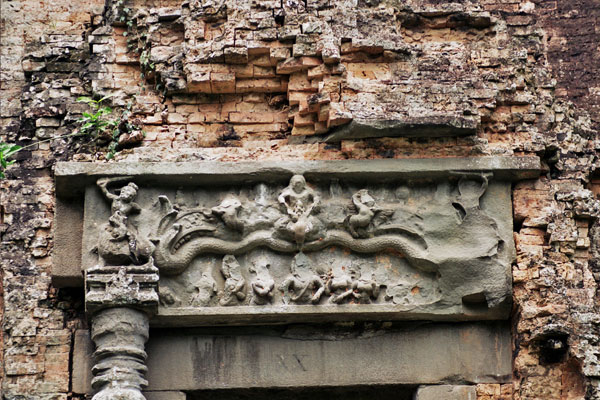
Temple S1.

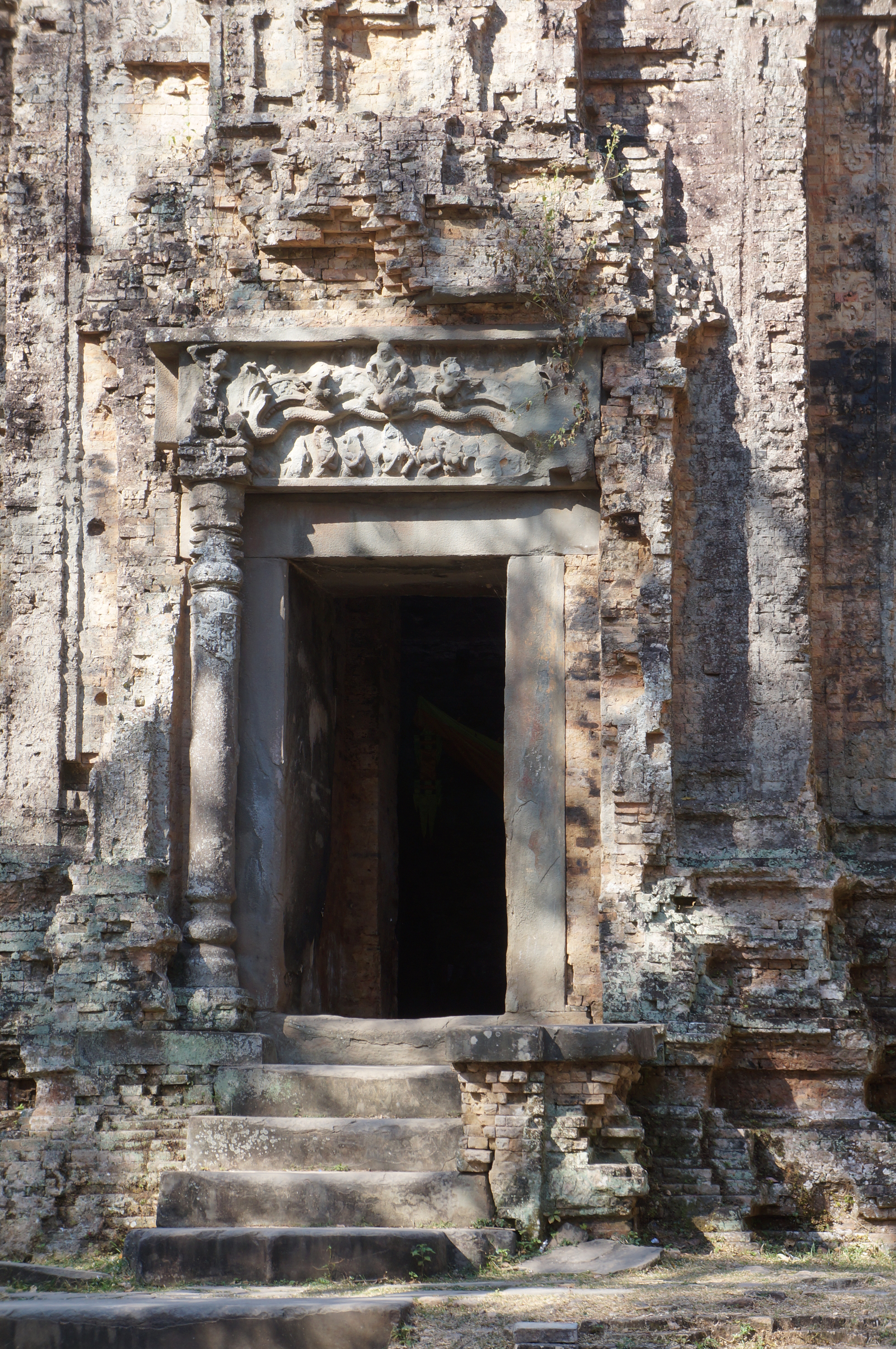
S1 Yeai Poeun Temple

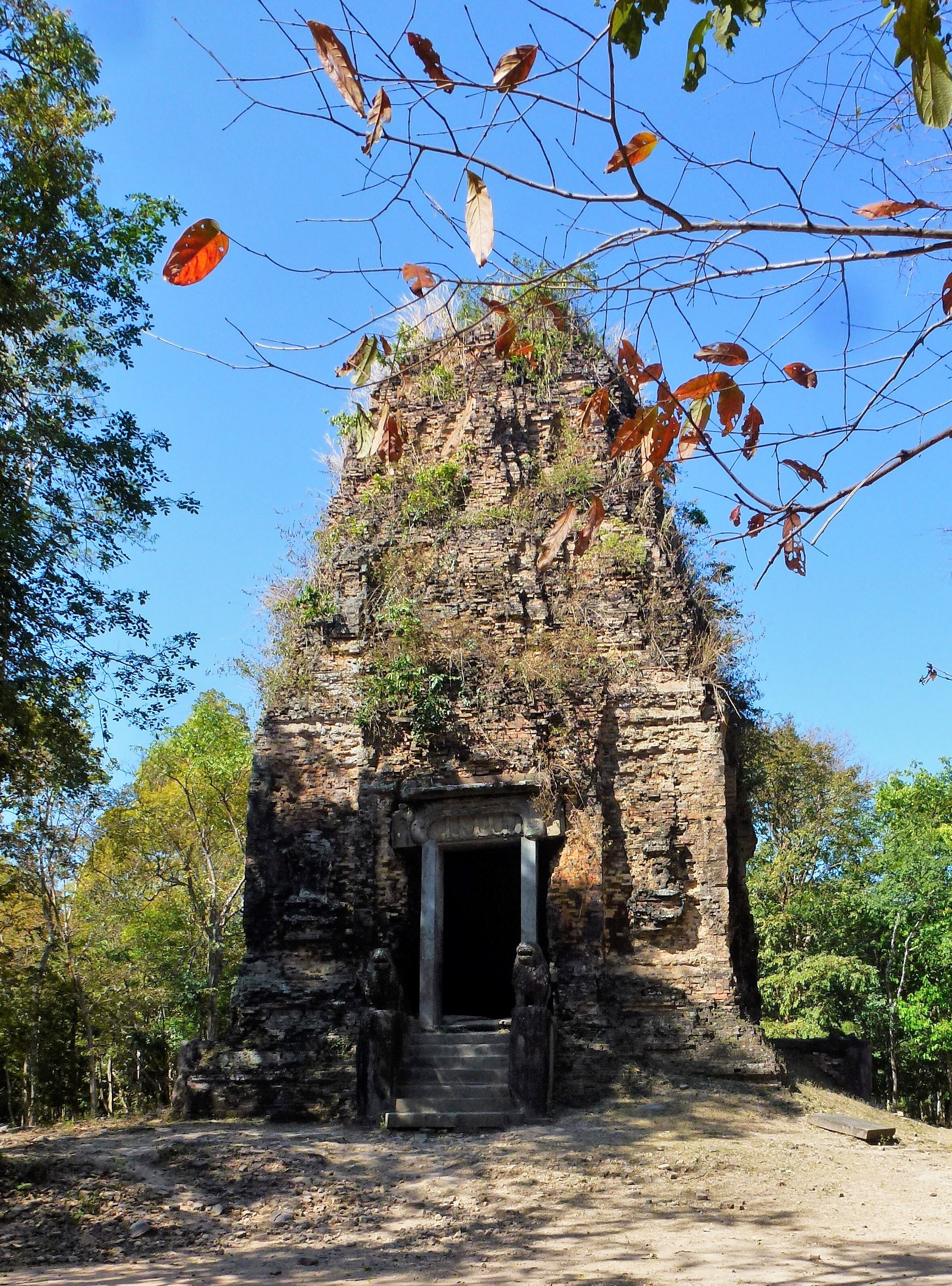
Prasat Boram

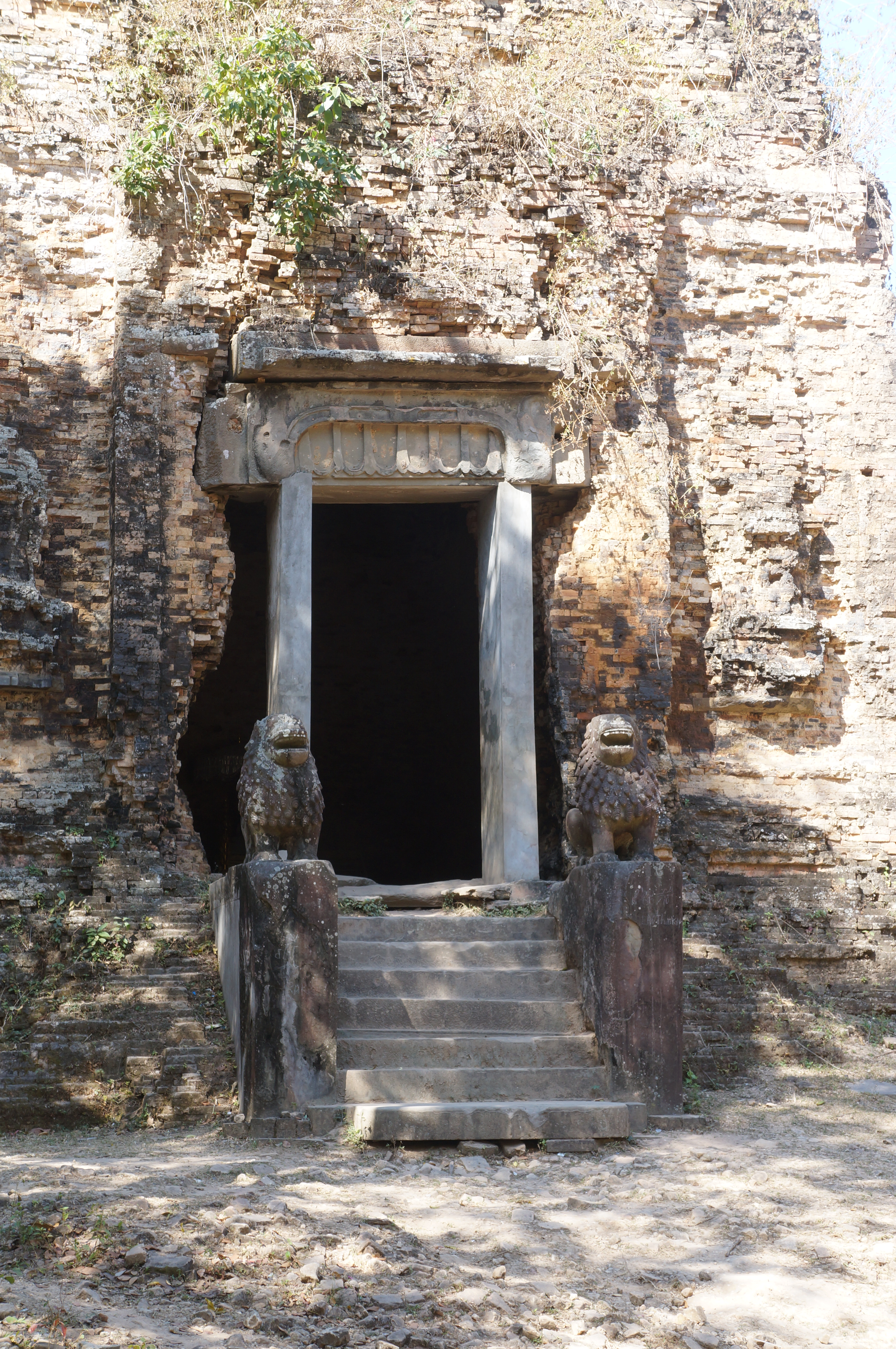
Prasat Boram S1 Sanctuary. Sambor Prei Kuk.

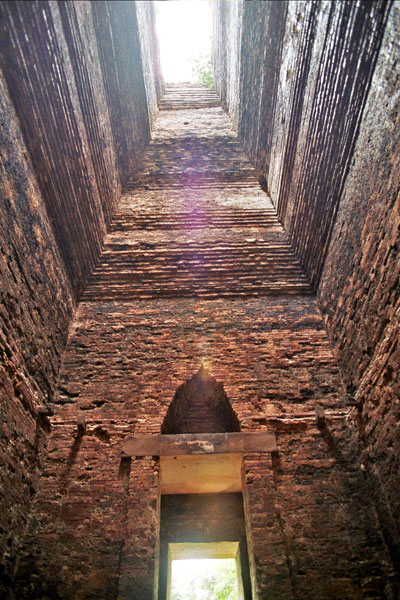
Interior Temple S1.

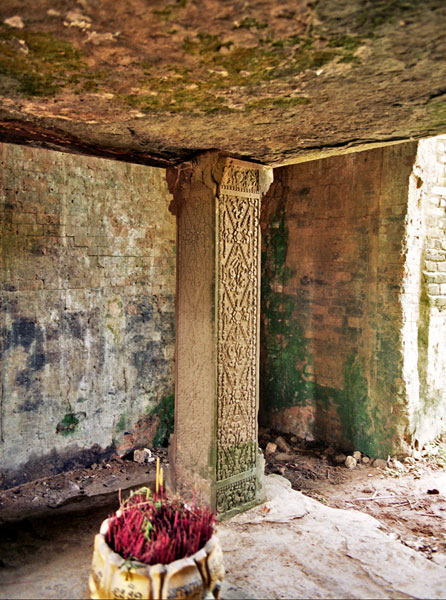
Interior Temple S1.

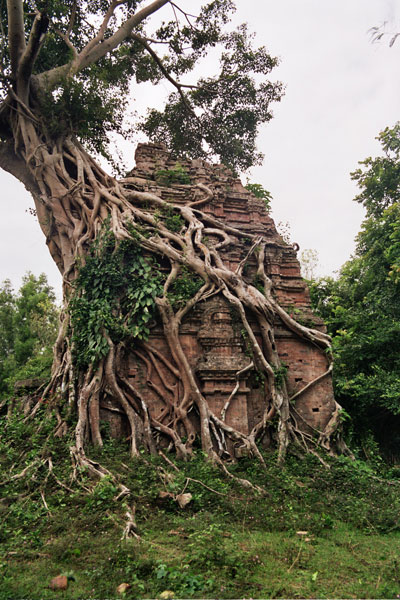
Temple N18.

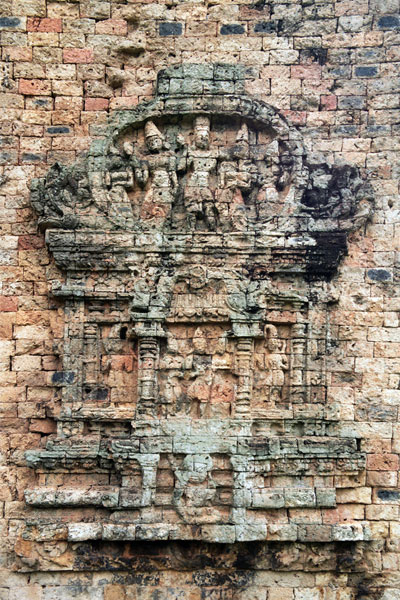
Temple N16.

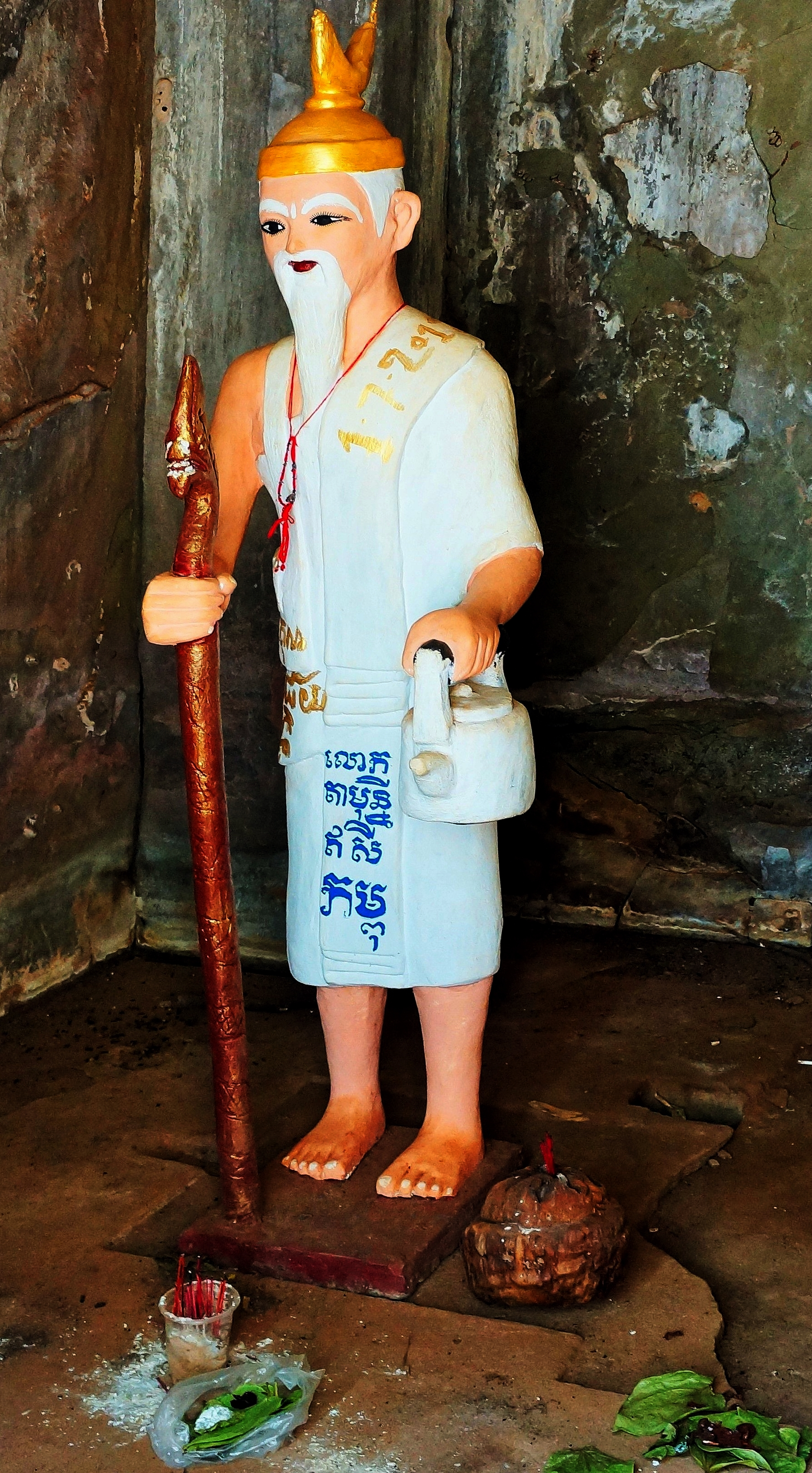
Yeay Mao in Sanctuaire S1.jpg

== See also ==
- List of World Heritage Sites in Cambodia
- Khmer architecture
- Hindu temple architecture
