= Jayadevi =

Queen of Chenla

Queen of Chenla
- Reign: c. 681 – c. 713
- Predecessor: Jayavarman I
- Successor: Pushkaraksha (as ruler of Lower Chenla)
- Spouse: Nripatindravarman I
- Issue: Pushkaraksha; Narendradevi
- Father: Jayavarman I

Jayadevi (Khmer: ជ័យទេវី, Jayadevī; fl. 713) was the queen regnant of the Kingdom of Chenla, the predecessor polity of the Khmer Empire, from c. 681 to c. 713.

She was the daughter of King Jayavarman I and her King consort was Nrpaditya, also known as Nripatindravarman I. She also had a sister, princess Sobhajaya, who married the Indian Sivait Brahim Sakrasvamin.

She succeeded her father as monarch upon his death in c. 681. She was the first female ruler since queen Kulaprabhavati (and Kambuja-raja-lakshmi, though she was Semi-legendary).

Traditionally, her succession has been interpreted as contested, creating a turmoil ultimately resulting in the division of Cambodia. It is attested that after c. 707, the kingdom was divided in two: Land Chenla and Water Chenla. There is little information about the Land and Water Chenla, which eventually were divided further.

Acrodding to the theories of George Cœdès and Lawrence Palmer Briggs, a female sovereign was not accepted by the people, and it resulted in civil war. Because inscriptions, dated between 681 and 713, don't name a sovereign and Chinese records state that the kingdom split into Land Chenla and Water Chenla after 707.

In 713, she left an inscription at Angkor in which she laments the bad times of the kingdom, and mention the donation she made to the sanctuary of Siva Tripurankata, which had been founded by her sister. It is unknown how long she ruled after 713. In 716, a king named Pushkaraksha is mentioned in an inscription, and it has been suggested that he obtained his position by marriage, but this is not confirmed, and he may also have simply been an usurper.

An alternative interpretation is that King Pushkaraksha was in fact her own son and successor rather than her rival. Further more, while Chinese sources mention that Chenla consisted of two kingdoms after c. 707, it appears that Chenla consisted of several smaller polities already prior to this point and that the interpretation that this signified a split was incorrect: King Pushkaraksha married Queen Indrani and became King consort of her kingdom, indicating that there already was another polity within Chenla before this.

== Sources ==
- Coedes, G. (1962). "The Making of South-east Asia." London: Cox & Wyman Ltd.
- George Cœdès: The Indianized States of South-East Asia

Preceded by Jayavarman I	Queen of Chenla c.681–c.713	Succeeded by Pushkaraksha
