= Isanavarman I =

- King of Chenla
- Reign: 616–637
- Predecessor: Mahendravarman I
- Successor: Bhavavarman II
- Died: Not recognized as a date. Years must have 4 digits (use leading zeros for years < 1000).
- Issue: · Jayavarman I · Sri Sarvani (female)
Names
- Īśānavarman
- Father: Mahendravarman I

Īśānavarman (Khmer: ឦសានវរ្ម័នទី១, Īsānavarman, Iśânasena) or Yīshēnàxiāndài (Chinese: 伊奢那先代) was a king of the kingdom of Chenla in 7th century, which would later become the Khmer Empire. He was the son of, and successor to Mahendravarman.

The name Isanavarman was derived from the word Siva. King Isanavarman was also called Protégé of the Master Siva.

After Mahendravarman's death, Isanavarman took Isanapura as his capital. The Sambor Prei Kuk historical complex has been identified as Isanapura, the 7th century capital of Chenla.

The main temples at Sambor Prei Kuk are said to have been founded by King Isanavarman I.

The Book of Sui, compiled in 636, states that at the beginning of the 7th century, Zhēnlà was ruled by one Yīshēnàxiāndài (Īśānavarman) (伊奢那先代). Inscription at Prasat Toc, Prasat Bayang, Vat Chakret, Kdei Ang Chumnik and Sambor Prei Kuk is attributed to the reign of Isanavarman I. The latest inscription attributed to him has been dated to 627 (549 Saka), while the only dated inscription attributed to his successor, Bhavavarman II, is of 639.

Ma Duanlin described King Ishanavarman's "sumptuous court" at Ishanapura, with the king wearing a crown of gold with precious stones, pearl pendants, and attended by five great ministers. Inscriptions to his reign may be found at Kdei Ang (AD 667), Roban Romas, Kuk Prah Kot, Wat Chakret, and Wat Po. The claimed authority over Tamrapura, Cakrankapura, Amoghapura and Bhimapura. Besides the future King Bhavavarman II, a second son, Shivadatta, was governor of Jyesthapura.

An inscription dating from the reign of Isanarvarman I, translated, reads: “The great King Isanavarman is full of glory and bravery. He is the King of Kings, who rules over Suvarnabhumi until the sea [Samudra-paryanta Suvarṇabhūmi], which is the border, while the kings in the neighbouring states honour his order to their heads”. Dr Vong Sotheara, of the Royal University of Phnom Penh, claimed that the inscription would “prove that Suvarnabhumi was the Khmer Empire.”

== Sons of Isanavarman ==
1. Sivadatta
2. Isvarakumara
3. Yuvaraja (Crown Prince) – Name not identified from historical records

== Historical connections ==
An incomplete inscription thought to be from the reign of King Isanavarman narrates, “The great King Īśānavarman is full of glory and bravery. He is the King of Kings, who rules over Suvarṇabhūmi until the sea [Samudra-paryanta Suvarṇabhūmi], which is the border, while the kings in the neighboring states honour his order to their heads.”

An incomplete Sanskrit inscription, found in the south gate of the Jami Masjid at Jaunpur, has traditionally been ascribed to the Maukhari king of Kanauj Īśvaravarman (first half of 6th century), which shows the connection of the Khmer kingdom with rulers at India during the same period.

Preceded by Mohendravarman	king of Chenla; 616–637	Succeeded by Bhavavarman II
