= Names of Cambodia =

The name of Cambodia in Khmer is កម្ពុជា (Kâmpŭchéa, ALA-: Kambujā [kampuciə]), officially ព្រះរាជាណាចក្រកម្ពុជា (UNGEGN: Preăhréachéanachâkr Kâmpŭchéa, ALA-LC: Braḥrājāṇācakr Kambujā [preahriəciənaːcak kampuciə]; lit. 'Kingdom of Cambodia'). The term derives from Sanskrit (IAST: Kambujadeśa), which means the "land of the sons of Kambu".

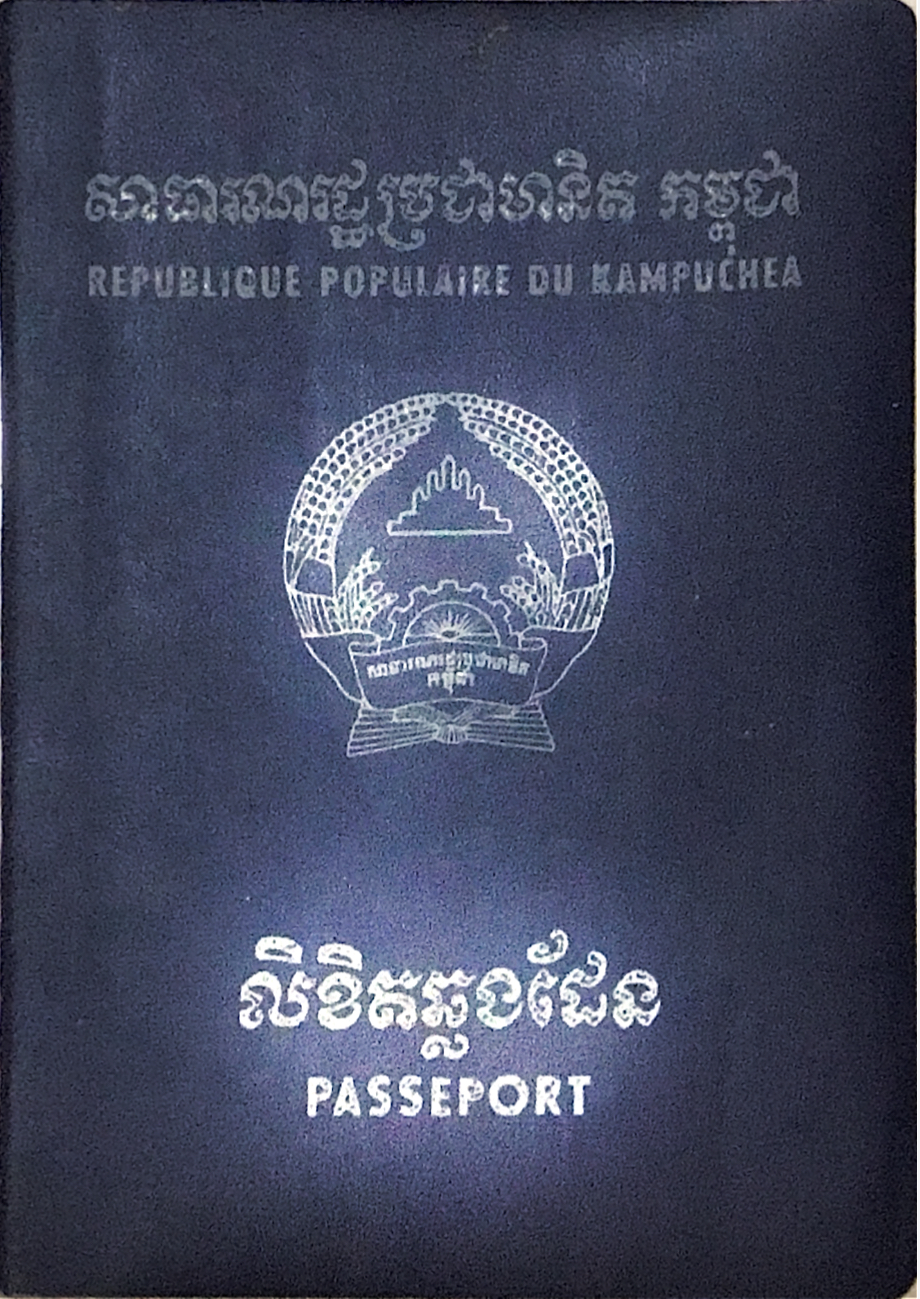
People's Republic of Kampuchea (1979–89)

Kingdom of Cambodia (1993–present)

Two Cambodian passports with official names of the country

== Endonym ==
An origin myth recorded in the Baksei Chamkrong inscription, dated AD 947, derives the name Kambuja (lit. 'sons of Kambu') from Kambu Swayambhuva, a legendary sage, who married Mera, the celestial nymph; their son was Srutavarman, the first king of Chenla. The same inscription also mentions the Brahmin prince Kaundinya I, who married a Nāga princess named Soma. According to the inscription, their descendant was Rudravarman, the last king of Funan.

Preăh Réachéanachâkr Kâmpŭchéa means "Kingdom of Cambodia". Etymologically, its components are: preăh ("sacred"); réach- ("king, royal, realm", from Sanskrit); -éana- (from Pāli āṇā, "authority, command, power"); -châkr (from Sanskrit chakra, meaning "wheel", a symbol of power and rule).

The name used on formal occasions, such as political speeches and news programs, is ប្រទេសកម្ពុជា Prâtés Kâmpŭchéa [prɑteːh kampuciə], translated to "the Country of Cambodia". The colloquial name most used by Cambodians is ស្រុកខ្មែរ Srŏk Khmêr [srok kʰmae], translated to "Land of the Khmers" or "Khmer’s Land". srŏk is a Mon-Khmer word roughly equal to the Sanskritic Prâtés, but less formal.

== Exonyms ==
The Khmer endonym of Cambodia is កម្ពុជា (Kâmpŭchéa) and has been used as part of the official name of the country since independence, with the exception of the 1970 to 1975 period, when the country was officially titled សាធារណរដ្ឋខ្មែរ (Sathearonaroat Khmae, English: Khmer Republic). The official exonym of the country in English, however, has varied between Cambodia and Kampuchea even when the endonym has remained consistent in Khmer. This reflects the usage that different Cambodian governments have used in international bodies such as the United Nations. This distinction is also followed in many other European languages, for example, Cambodge and Kampuchéa in French. However, some Asian languages do not make this distinction; the exonym for Cambodia in standard Chinese is 柬埔寨 (Jiǎnpǔzhài) and in Vietnamese Campuchia, regardless of the exonym changes in Western languages.

The Khmer Rouge-led regime of 1975 to 1979 was the first to use Kampuchea in international usage, calling the country Democratic Kampuchea in the United Nations and in international documents. This romanization was used to come closer to the Khmer endonym of the country and because names like Cambodia and similar European names were seen as colonial distortions of the country's native name. The Vietnamese-backed Hun Sen-led government, while ideologically opposed to the Khmer Rouge, retained this usage, calling the country the People's Republic of Kampuchea in international bodies. In 1989, the name State of Cambodia was adopted, in part due to the association of Kampuchea with the Khmer Rouge period, as well emphasizing continuity with the earlier Kingdom of Cambodia. The later name was readopted when the country became a constitutional monarchy in 1993.

== Official names of Cambodia since independence ==
| English | Khmer | Romanization of Khmer | French | Date | Notes |
|---|---|---|---|---|---|
| Kingdom of Cambodia | ព្រះរាជាណាចក្រកម្ពុជា | Preăh Réachéanachâkr Kâmpŭchéa | Royaume du Cambodge | 1953–1970 | Under a monarchy. |
| Khmer Republic | សាធារណរដ្ឋខ្មែរ | Sathéarônârôdth Khmêr | République khmère | 1970–1975 | Under a military-led government. |
| Kingdom of Kampuchea | ព្រះរាជាណាចក្រកម្ពុជា | Preăh Réachéanachâkr Kâmpŭchéa | Royuame du Kampuchéa | 1975-1976 | Monarchy under a coalition between the Khmer Rouge regime and a monarchist government in exile. |
| Democratic Kampuchea | កម្ពុជាប្រជាធិបតេយ្យ | Kâmpŭchéa Prâchéathĭbâtéyy | Kampuchéa démocratique | 1976–1982 | Under the Khmer Rouge regime; maintained international recognition. |
| Coalition Government of Democratic Kampuchea | រដ្ឋាភិបាលចំរុះកម្ពុជាប្រជាធិបតេយ្យ | Rôdthaphĭbál Châmrŏh Kâmpŭchéa Prâchéathĭbâtéyy | Gouvernement de coalition du Kampuchéa démocratique | 1982–1990 | Khmer Rouge-led government in exile retained international recognition. |
| National Government of Cambodia | រដ្ឋាភិបាលជាតិនៃកម្ពុជា | Rôdthaphĭbál Chéatĕ Ney Kâmpŭchéa | Gouvernement national du Cambodge | 1990–1993 | Transitional name until the restoration of the monarchy. |
| People's Republic of Kampuchea | សាធារណរដ្ឋប្រជាមានិតកម្ពុជា | Sathéarânârôdth Brâchéaméanĭt Kâmpŭchéa | République populaire du Kampuchéa | 1979–1989 | Partially recognized polity under the rule of the Vietnamese-sponsored government and military occupation. |
| State of Cambodia | រដ្ឋកម្ពុជា | Rôdth Kâmpŭchéa | État du Cambodge | 1989–1993 | Under the United Nations Transitional Authority. |
| Kingdom of Cambodia | ព្រះរាជាណាចក្រកម្ពុជា | Preăh Réachéanachâkr Kâmpŭchéa | Royaume du Cambodge | 1993–present | Under a restored monarchy. |

== See also ==
- Khom
- Greater India

By ISO 639-3 code
Enter an ISO code to find the corresponding language article.
