= Vīravarman =

King of Chenla

Viravarman វីរៈវរ្ម័ន
- Viravarman

King of Chenla
- Reign: 560 – 575 AD
- Predecessor: Sreshthavarman
- Successor: Kambuja-raja-lakshmi
- Born: Bhavapura
- Issue: Mahendravarman; Bhavavarman I (stepson)
- House: House of Bhavapura
- Dynasty: Chenla
- Father: Sārvabhauma
- Religion: Hinduism

Viravarman (Khmer: វីរៈវរ្ម័ន, Viravarman) was the king of Chenla.

== Biography ==
King Viravarman was from the House of Kaundinya (Lunar Dynasty). He was referred to in an inscription as the son of Sārvabhauma Rundravrma, the founder of the Chenla capital, Bhavapura. He was the father of King Mahendravarman and stepfather of King Bhavavarman I, who was the son of King Prathivīndravarman.

Preceded by Sreshthavarman	King of Bhavapura; 560 – 575 AD	Succeeded by Kambuja-raja-lakshmi
