= Kambu Swayambhuva =

Legendary ruler in northern India

Kambu Swayambhuva was a legendary sage from whom the ruling dynasty of the medieval Khmer Empire claimed descent. According to the Cambodian annals, he was a king of Aryadeśa, and the Khmer Empire came to be known as Kambujadeśa (lit. 'the land of the sons of Kambu') after him, which ultimately gave its name to modern Cambodia.

== Account ==
Scholar George Coedes refers to a 10th century inscription of a Cambodian dynastic legend in which the hermit Kambu Swayambhuva and the celestial nymph Mera, who was given to him by Śiva, unite and establish the Cambodian royal dynasty, first of whom was the Chenla ruler Srutavarman and his son Sreshthavarman.

== See also ==
- Kaundinya I
- List of kings of Cambodia
- Names of Cambodia
