= Kambuja-raja-lakshmi =

Kambujarajalakshmi កម្ពុជរាជលក្ស្មី
- Queen Kambujarajalakshmi

Queen regnant of Chenla
- Reign: 575–580 AD
- Predecessor: Vira Varman
- Successor: Bhavavarman I

Queen consort of Chenla
- Tenure: 580–?
- Born: Shreshthapura
- Spouse: Bhavavarman I
- Issue: Bhavavarman II
- House: House of Kambuj
- Dynasty: Chenla (Solar Dynasty)
- Father: Shreshthavarman
- Religion: Hindu

Queen Kambujarajalakshmi or Kambuja-raja-lakshmi (Khmer: កម្ពុជរាជលក្ស្មី, Thai: กัมพุชราชลักษมี) was a semi-legendary queen regnant of Chenla in Cambodia in 575–580.

== Biography ==
Kambujarajalakshmi was a Princess of King Shreshthavarman of Shreshthapura, and belonged to the oldest line of the Chenla royal dynasty through her mother. According to a traditional version of events, she succeeded king Vira Varman in 575, and was succeeded on the throne by her spouse, Bhavavarman I, who succeeded to the throne by marriage.

However, there are no contemporary sources for her reign, and there are theories that she is a later invention.

Preceded by Vira Varman	Queen regnant of Chenla; 575 – 580 AD	Succeeded by Bhavavarman I
