= Bhavavarman I =

Bhavavarman I ភវវរ្ម័នទី១

King of Chenla
- Reign: 580-598
- Predecessor: Kambujarajalakshmi
- Successor: Mahendravarman
- Born: Bhavapura
- Died: 600; Bhavapura, Chenla
- Consort: Kambujarajalakshmi
- Issue: Bhavavarman II
Names
- Bhavavarman
- House: Chenla
- Dynasty: Varman
- Father: Prathivindravarman; Veeravarman (stepfather); Cakravartin (grandfather)
- Religion: Hinduism

Bhavavarman I or Phraya Kalavarnadishraj (Khmer: ភវវរ្ម័នទី១; Chinese: 撥婆跋摩; pinyin: Bópóbámó) was a king of Chenla, which would later become the Khmer Empire.

== Biography ==
Though the full dates of his reign are unknown, it is known that Bhavavarman reigned around the year 550. From his reading of the Ta Prohm Stèle, George Coedès understood a princess named Kambujarajalakshmi to have been Bhavavarman's queen, and that it was through her that he inherited the royal lineage. Coedès thought he was also very likely the grandson of the king of Funan, a neighboring and more powerful Cambodian kingdom. However subsequent research by the epigraphist Claude Jacques revealed that Kambuja-raja-lakshmi was the queen of another king, Harshavarman I, who reigned in 910–923 AD, long after the Funan period and so she could not have passed on the royal lineage to Bhavavarman.

According to Coedès, the main accomplishment of Bhavavarman's reign was the expansion of Kamboja into the Mekong river valley, attacking both Funan. The reasons for these attacks are not clear, but most likely revolve around the accession of Rudravarman to the throne of Funan; Rudravarman killed the legitimate heir to the throne, and Bhavavarman may have seen himself as a rightful member of that lineage. It is not clear, however, if he wanted to claim the throne of Funan for himself, or to simply see Rudravarman unseated so that the next legitimate heir could take it.

He was succeeded by his maternal brother, Chitrasena, who took the reign name Mahendravarman.

Chinese records of the time indicate that Chitrasena was responsible for the conquest of Funan. The Chinese records also indicate that, around this time, the king of Funan was replaced, and that the new king was a 'wicked king' who did not support Buddhism. Bhavavarman belonged to the traditional Shaivite religion of Kamboja.

| Preceded by Kambuja-raja-lakshmi | king of Chenla; 550-600 | Succeeded by Mahendravarman |
