= Sreshthavarman =

King of Chenla

- Sreshthavarman

King of Chenla
- Reign: ~495 - 530 AD
- Predecessor: Shrutavarman
- Successor: Vīravarman
- Born: Shreshthapura
- Issue: Kambuja-raja-lakshmi
- House: House of Kambuj
- Dynasty: Chenla (Solar Dynasty)
- Religion: Hinduism

Sreshthavarman (Old Khmer: ឝ្រេឝ្ឋវម៌្ម; Khmer: ស្រេស្ឋវរ្ម័ន, Shreshthavarman) was the second king of Chenla.

== Biography ==
King Shreshthavarman was the son of King Shrutavarman. He was the founder of the capital, Sreshthapura, at the foot of the mountain where Prasat Vat Phou located. He was the father of Queen Kambujarajalakshmi and the father-in-law of King Bhavavarman I.

Preceded by Shrutavarman	King of Chenla; ~495 - 530 AD	Succeeded by Vīravarman
