= Srutavarman =

King of Chenla

- Srutavarman

King of Chenla
- Reign: 435 - 495 AD
- Predecessor: Kambu Svayambhuva
- Successor: Shreshthavarman
- Born: Shreshthapura
- Issue: Shreshthavarman
- House: House of Kambuj
- Dynasty: Chenla (Solar Dynasty)
- Religion: Hinduism

Srutavarman (Old Khmer: ឝ្រុតវម៌្ម; Khmer: ស្រុតវរ្ម័ន, Shrutavarman) was the first king of Chenla.

== Biography ==
King Srutavarman freed Kambuja “Chenla” from the domination of Funan in the 5th century. He descended from the House of Kambuj founded by Bramin, Kambu Svayambhuva and Apsara, Mera. He was the father of King Shreshthavarman.

| Preceded by Kambu Svayambhuva | King of Chenla; 435 - 495 AD | Succeeded by Shreshthavarman |
