= Queen Soma =

Legendary founder of Kingdom of Funan

Soma
- 1st Monarch of Cambodia
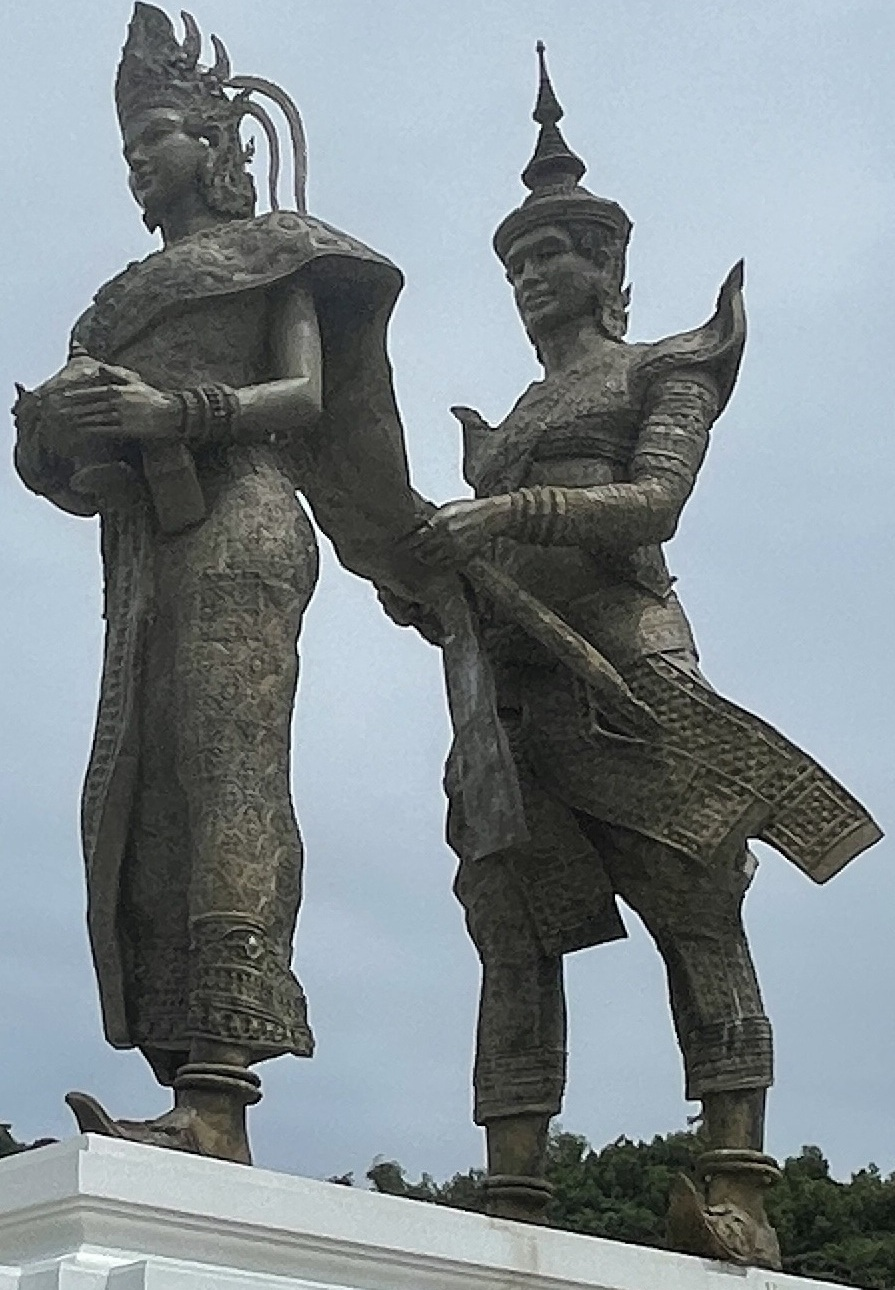
- Statue of Queen Soma (left) with her husband (right)

Queen of Funan
- Reign: 1st century CE
- Coronation: 68 CE
- Predecessor: Inaugural holder
- Successor: Kaundinya I
- Born: Funan
- Spouse: Kaundinya I
- House: Somvong (by birth) Kaundinya (by marriage)
- Father: Som (mythology)

Soma (Khmer: សោមា, ALA-LC: Somā) was the queen of Funan who is widely viewed as the first monarch of Cambodia (reigned c. 1st century CE). She was also the first female leader of Cambodia. Her consort was Kaundinya I (also known as "Huntien" and "Preah Thong"). She is known as Soma (Sanskrit), Liǔyè (Chinese: 柳葉), Liễu Diệp (Vietnamese: 柳葉) and Neang Neak (Khmer: នាងនាគ, UNGEGN: Néang Néak; lit. 'Dragon Woman').

== Accounts ==
Queen Soma and her husband, Kaundinya I, are known in Khmer legend as Preah Thong and Neang Neak.

According to reports by two Chinese envoys, Kang Tai and Zhu Ying, the state of Funan was established by a traveller from east named Kaundinya. According to the Chinese history text Book of Liang, the people of Funan made a woman, named Liǔyè (柳葉), their monarch, and then she surrendered to a foreign man named Hùntián (混塡) and was married to him.

As per the legends, a Brahmin from east, named Kaundinya, arrived in Funan, ruled by Soma, daughter of the chieftain of the local Nāga clan. After a battle in which Kaundinya prevailed, princess Soma was impressed by his bravery and proposed marriage which was accepted. The union led to the foundation of the House that became the royal dynasty of Funan which would rule the region for many generations and the royal legitimacy was also acquired through the female line in the kingdom. This also explains the reason why the serpent (Nāga) became an important part of Khmer iconography as is seen a thousand years later when this historic mystical union remained an important part of the court ceremonies at Angkor during the era of the Khmer Empire.

New title new state formed	Queen of Funan; 50/68 CE – 1st century CE	Succeeded by Kaundinya I
