= Preah Thong and Neang Neak =

Cambodian foundation myth

ព្រះថោង និង នាងនាគ
- រូបសំណាកព្រះថោងនាងនាគ
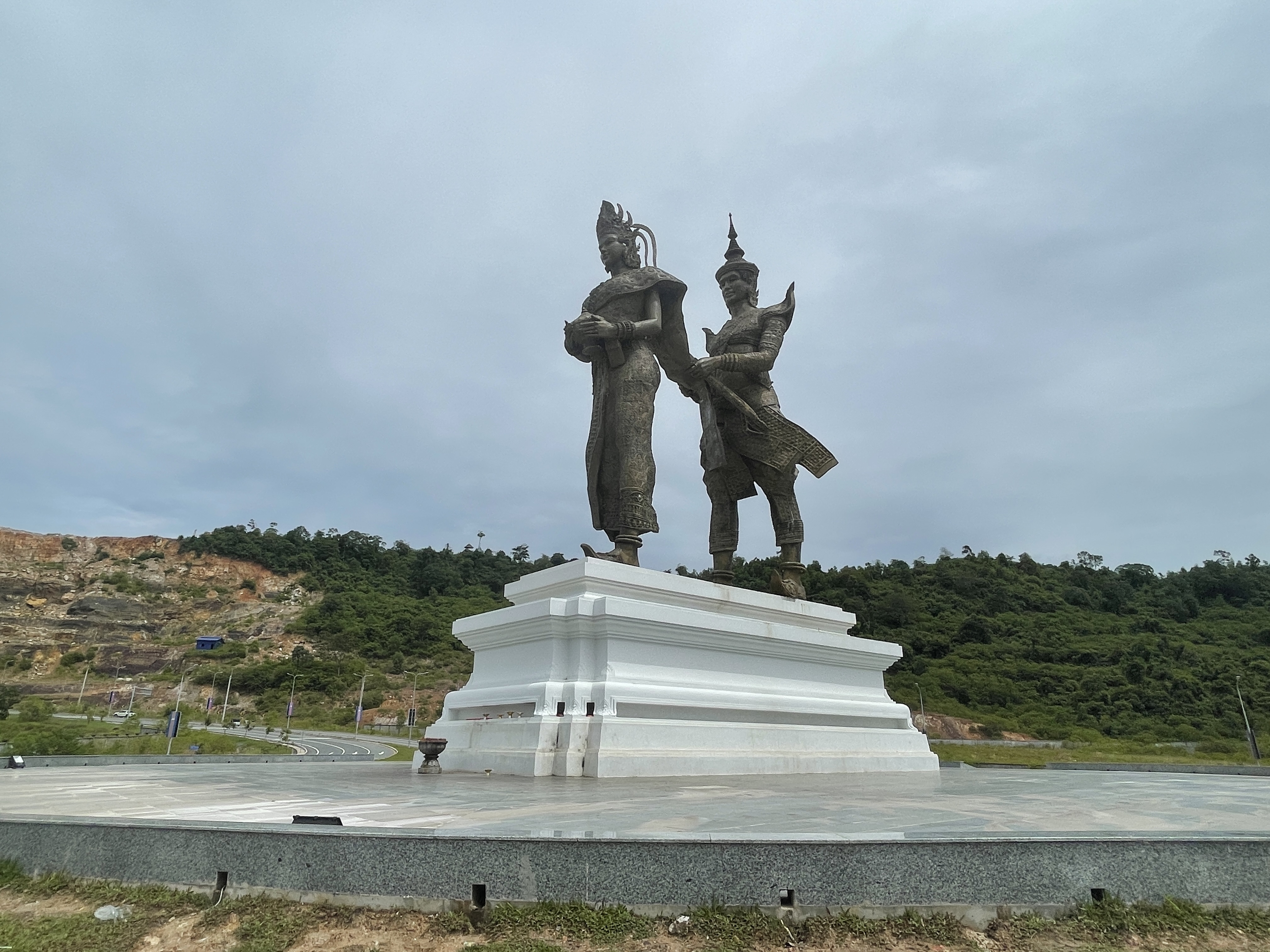
- Location: Preah Thong Neang Neak roundabout, Kampong Saom, Preah Sihanouk, Cambodia
- Material: Copper (60 tonnes)
- Height: statue: 21 metres (69 ft); base: 6.34 metres (20.8 ft)
- Completion date: 2022

The Preah Thong and Neang Neak is a Cambodian foundation myth which symbolises the birth of Khmer land, culture, traditions and civilisation of Cambodia. According to the legend, a foreign prince named Preah Thong married a Nāga princess Neang Neak, founding the first kingdom of Cambodia, namely Funan.

A set of statues of Preah Thong and Neang Neak was completed in 2022, which is 21 metres tall, on a pedestal 6.34 metres high (27.34 metres in total), and weighs 60 tonnes, being the largest copper statue in Cambodia, facing the sea.

== Overview ==
Preah Thong (Y Da) and Neang Neak (Y Ga) are symbolic personas in Khmer culture who are believed to have founded the pre-Angkorian state of Funan. Much of Khmer wedding customs can be traced back to the marriage of Preah Thong and Neang Neak. The Cambodian Royal Chronicles contain several variants of the legend of the Brahmin prince Preah Thong arriving via sea route from Takkasīlā or Indraprastha and his marriage with the Nāga princess Neang Neak. The Mỹ Sơn Inscription, dated to 657 CE, also mentions the legend of Kaundinya and his queen Soma, and states that Kaundinya was a Brahmin who married Soma, the daughter of the Nāga (serpent) king. The Chinese historical accounts, such as that of official Kang Tai who travelled to Funan in the 3rd century CE and the 7th-century History of the Chin preserve a similar tradition, in which a foreign prince named Hun-tian — Chinese transcription of Kaundinya — arrived in Funan and married Liu-ye, the local ruling princess.

== See also ==
- Norodom Sihanouk Memorial, in Cambodia
- Tomb of Queen Consort of King Suro, in Korea
- Memorial of Heo Hwang-ok, Ayodhya, in India
