= INSV Kaundinya =

Indian Navy ship

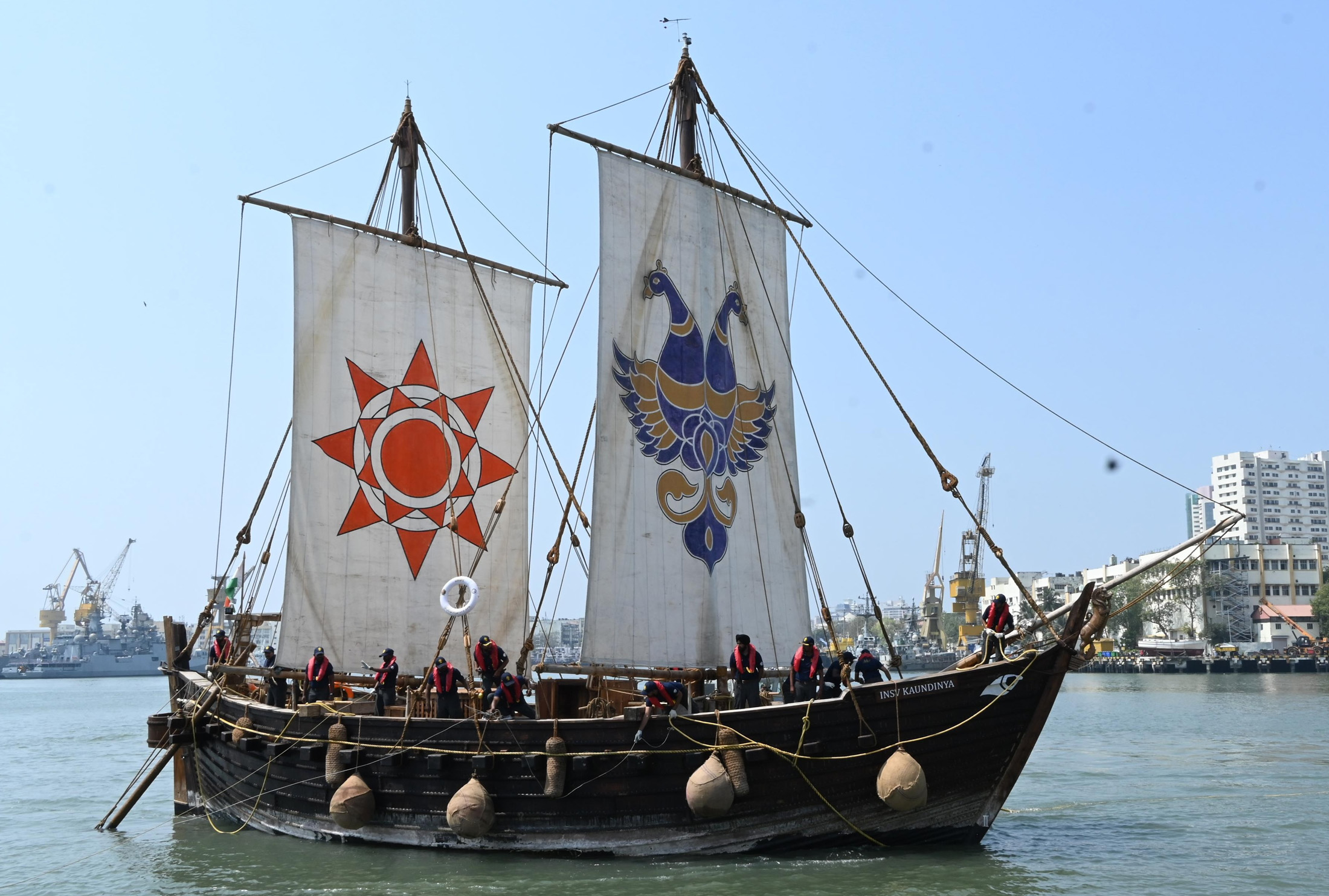
- INSV Kaundinya returns from her maiden voyage to Oman

History

India
- Name: Kaundinya
- Namesake: Kaundinya I Legendary 1st-century Indian mariner who became King of Cambodia
- Builder: M/s Hodi Innovations (OPC) Private Ltd.
- Laid down: September 2023
- Launched: February 2025
- Commissioned: 21 May 2025
- Notes: INSV Kaundinya

General characteristics
- Length: 19.6 metres (64.3 feet)
- Beam: 6.5 metres (21 feet)
- Draught: 3.33 metres (10.9 feet)
- Propulsion: twin sail, oars
- Crew: 15
- Notes: all natural material used and ship built using ancient technique

INSV Kaundinya is an Indian navy sailing vessel constructed using sewn ship technique. Her design is based on a 5th-century CE/AD merchant ship depicted in the murals of cave 17 of Ajanta Caves complex.

It is named after Kaundinya (or Kaundinya I), who was a legendary first-century Indian mariner who sailed to Southeast Asia, married Queen Soma of Funan, which comprised most of the present day Cambodia. He became the second king of Funan kingdom.

== Background ==
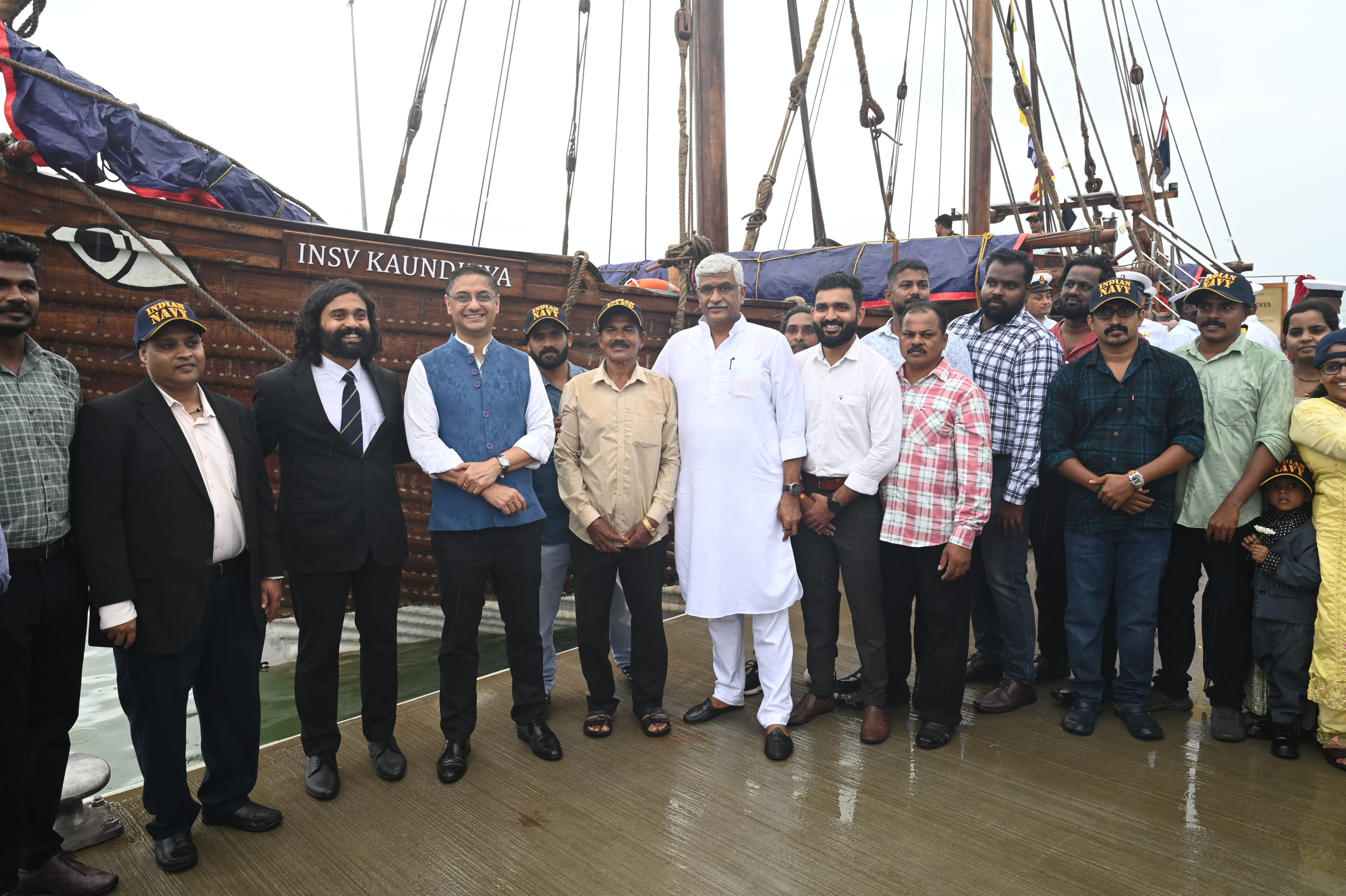
The Stitched Ship project team

Ancient ships constructed in India often used natural fibers as fasteners instead of metallic nails so as to prevent corrosion. This technique is similar to sewn ships and boats found in other regions of the ancient world. Use of natural fibers like coir for sewn construction is mentioned in texts such as the Yukti Kalpataru, an 11th-century encyclopedic treatise on Indian craftsmanship. The idea of reconstructing an ancient Indian sailing vessel was conceptualised by economist, historian and author Sanjeev Sanyal. The concept was realised into a project by Cdr Hemanth Kumar, a Naval Architect from the Indian Navy. The project was funded by Ministry of Culture and was initiated via a tripartite agreement signed among the Ministry, Indian Navy, and Goa-based shipbuilding company M/s Hodi Innovations (OPC) Private Ltd. in July 2023. The keel laying of the ship happened in September 2023.

Sanjeev Sanyal said about Kaundinya, "He is the first Indian mariner, who we know by name, to have crossed the seas to visit Southeast Asia and had a significant impact on world history," told The Indian Express. Though India has an old maritime culture dating back to the Bronze Age, we do not know the names of those mariners who were crossing the seas. The first definitive one, who was engaging in maritime voyages to far-away lands and of whom we know, is Kaundinya. His references are recorded in Cambodian and Southern Vietnamese sources, but not in Indian records. We do not know what Kaundinya's ship looked like. But the ships of that period looked like what we have built".

== Development ==
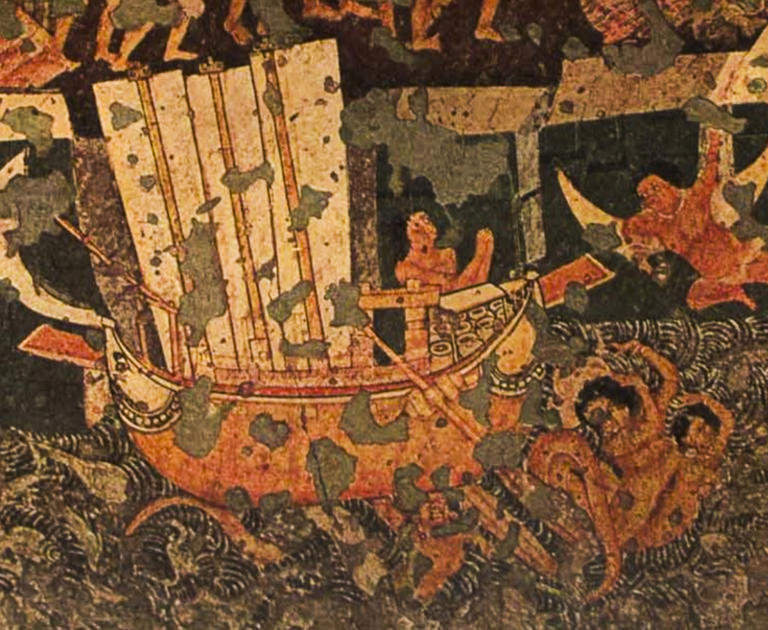
The 5th century Ajanta cave mural that inspired creation of INSV Kaundinya

The ship's design draws inspiration from 5th-century CE murals found in the Ajanta Caves, depicting similar vessels. Without blueprint the Indian Navy and artisans from Kerala headed by master shipwright Babu Sankaran and builder Prathamesh Dandekar worked together to recreate the ship. The stitched ship is equipped with square sails and steering oars, which are entirely alien to modern day ships. The hull geometry, rigging and sails were reimagined and tested from first principles. Indian Navy collaborated with the Department of Ocean Engineering, IIT Madras, for validating the vessel's hydrodynamic behaviour at sea. In-house structural analysis to assess the wooden mast system, designed and constructed without contemporary materials, was done using iconographic references and hydrodynamic model testing conducted at IIT Madras. The Stitched ship project was initiated through a tripartite agreement between the Indian Ministry of Culture, the Indian Navy, and Goa-based shipbuilding company M/s Hodi Innovations (OPC) Private Ltd. in July 2023. The keel was laid on 12 September 2023 and ship was commissioned on 21 May 2025. The Indian Navy oversaw the design, technical validation, and construction process. As per Indian Navy, the stitched ship is equipped with square sails and steering oars, which are "entirely alien to modern-day ships". The hull geometry, rigging, and sails had to be reimagined and tested from first principles.

=== Ship Description ===
The ships motifs are the Gandabherunda or the two headed eagle and the Sun. A Simha Yali is depicted on the bow, and a Harappan style stone anchor adorns her deck. In the ancient "stitched shipbuilding," technique wooden planks are tied together using coir rope, coconut fibre, and sealed with natural resin. The ship serves as a tangible symbol of India's long standing maritime traditions of exploration, trade, and cultural exchange. The ship is also equipped with certain modern technologies, such as a Eutelsat Oneweb satellite dish, facilitating long-range satellite communications with other vessels during transit.

== Service history ==
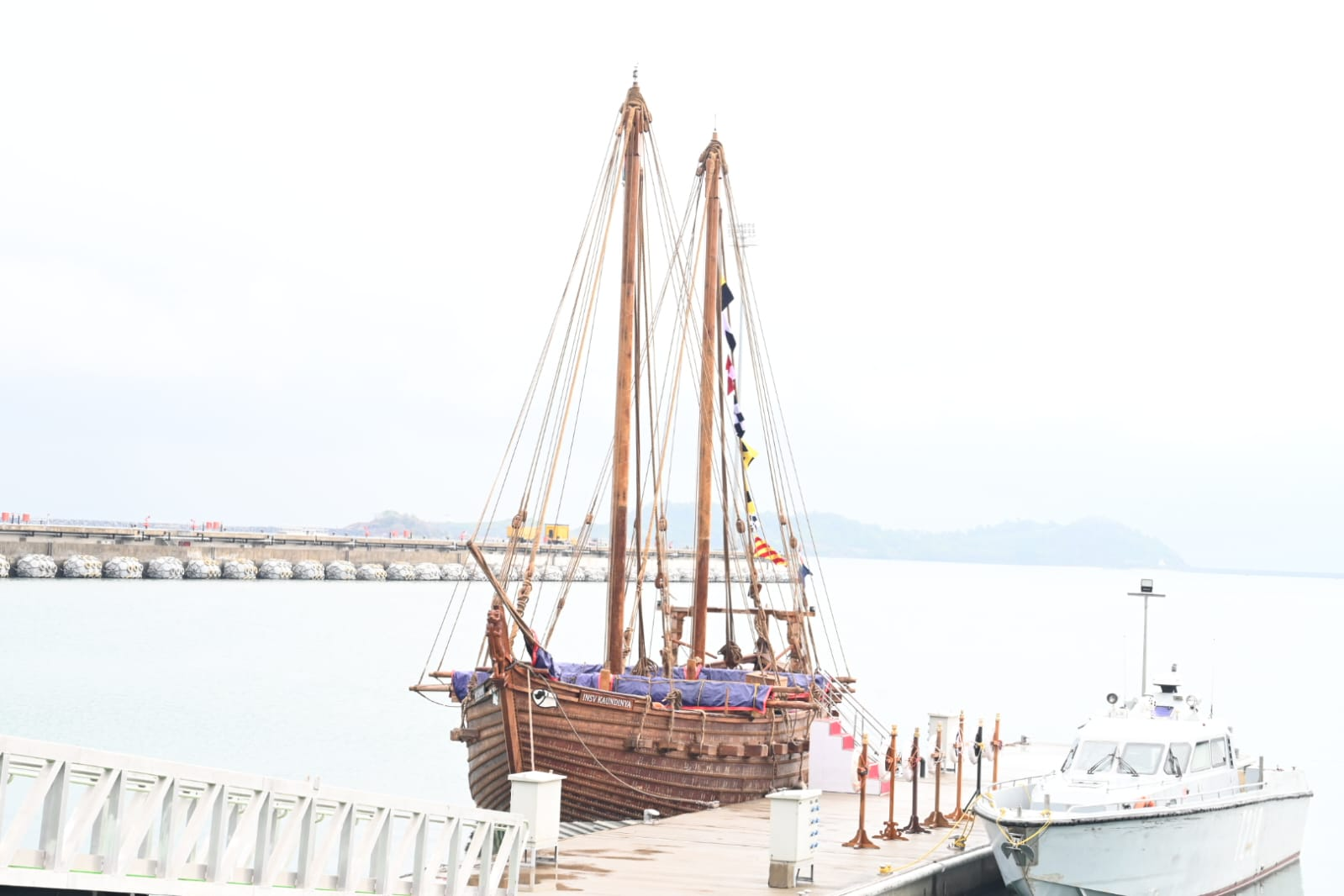
INSV Kaundinya on launch

After its launch in February 2025, the ship was formally inducted by the Indian Navy on 21 May 2025. The ship is based at Karwar Naval Base and its first transoceanic voyage with a 15-member crew along the ancient trade route from Gujarat to Oman is planned for late 2025.

Kaundinya sailed out of Karwar Naval Base en route to Porbandar on 13 December 2025. The ship will take 8–10 days to reach the port city following which it will start its maiden transoceanic journey to Oman on 29 December. The ship crew has received harbour training including rigging and carpentry by traditional artisans. The ship, with 13 sailors and four officers, led by Commander Vikas Sheoran, left Porbandar for Muscat on 29 December 2025. Commander Y Hemant Kumar, associated with the project since conceptualisation, will serve as the Officer-in-Charge of the expedition. By 12 January 2026, the ship had reached Omani waters, North of Sur. She reached Muscat on 14 January. She returned to Mumbai upon conclusion of her voyage on 2 February 2026. The ship returned to India by the end of March.

On 3 February 2026, it was reported that the ship will retrace another ancient trade route from Odisha to Bali, Indonesia on the event of Kartika Purnima. This was announced by Sanjeev Sanyal, a member of the Economic Advisory Council to the Prime Minister (EAC-PM).

== See also ==
- List of active Indian Navy ships
- Jewel of Muscat
