= Kaundinya I =

Legendary founding monarch of Funan

- Monarch of Funan
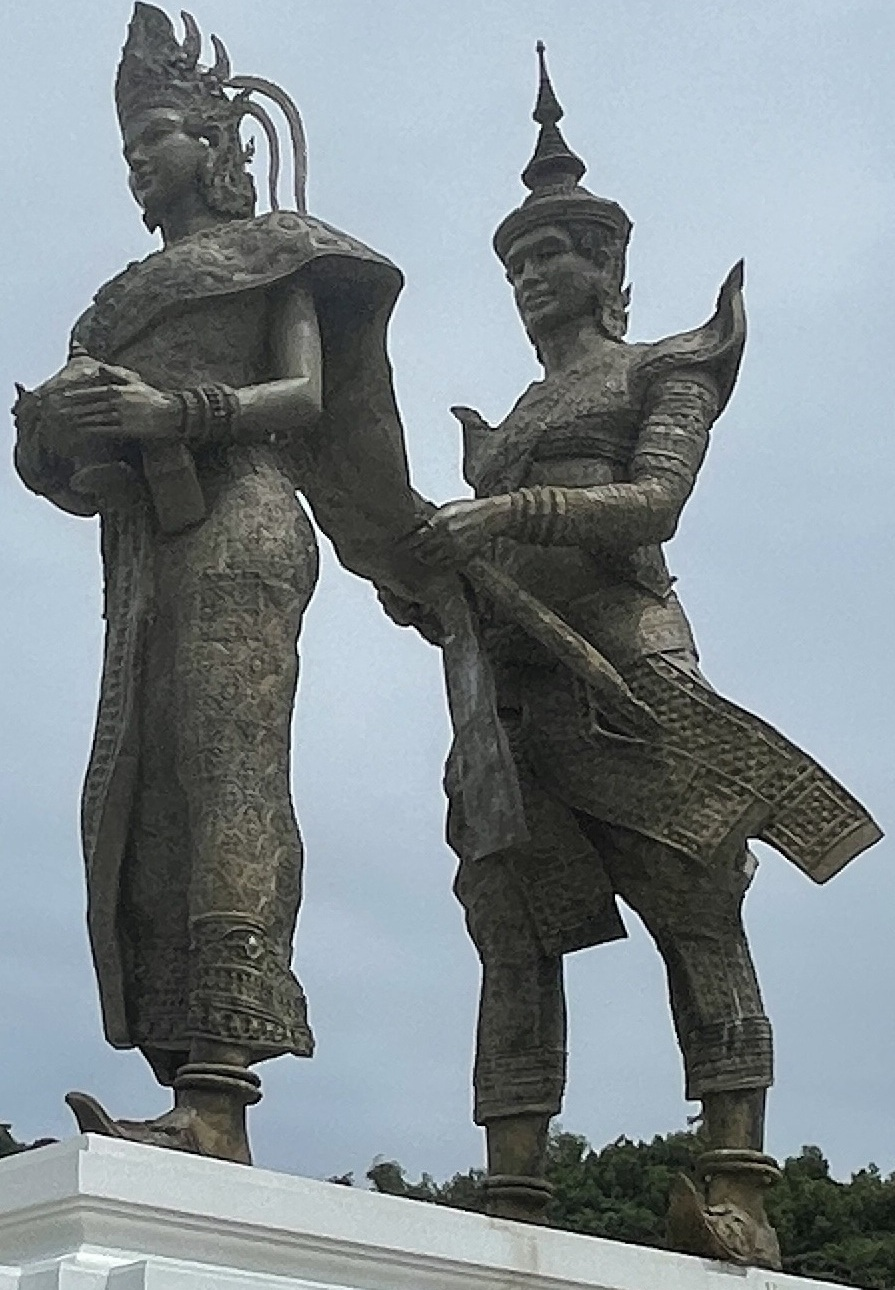
- Statue of Soma and Kaundinya I (right)

King of Funan
- Reign: 1st century CE
- Coronation: later 1st century CE
- Predecessor: Queen Soma
- Successor: Pán Huàng
- Died: Funan
- Spouse: Queen Soma
- House: Kaundinya

Kaundinya I (Sanskrit: Kauṇḍinya ; Khmer: កៅណ្ឌិន្យ), also known as Preah Thong (Khmer: ព្រះថោង), was a legendary founding monarch of Funan (c. 1st century) in modern-day Cambodia, in mainland Southeast Asia, which was centered on the Mekong Delta. Said to be a Brahmin from east, he was the consort of Soma, Queen of Funan, also known as Neang Neak in Khmer.

The later kings of Khmer Empire claimed descent from them as well as from Kambu Swayambhuva. They co-founded the kingdom of Funan with its capital located at Vyādhapura. Funan is generally considered as the earliest known kingdom in Southeast Asia.

== Background ==
The Cambodian folklore tells about the arrival of the Brahmin merchant Kaundinya from east in 68 CE and his subsequent marriage to the Nāga princess Soma, an event traditionally associated with the founding of the ancient Funan kingdom in Southeast Asia. The story has become a foundational legend in Khmer culture, where the union of Kaundinya and Soma is personified in the origin myth of Preah Thong and Neang Neak.

== Accounts ==
One of the earliest inscriptions naming Kaundinya and his queen Soma is that of Mỹ Sơn, dated 657 CE, according to which Kaundinya was a Brahmin who married Soma, the daughter of the Nāga (serpent) king. Similarly, the Baksei Chamkrong inscription, dated 947 CE, which traces genealogy of the Khmer kings, gives same account of Kaundinya marrying Soma. Another earlier, although damaged, Phnom Bayang inscription (640 CE) also preserves names of Kaundinya and Soma.

The earliest version of the tradition, however, was recorded by the Chinese official Kang Tai, who travelled to Funan in the 3rd century CE. According to him, the original monarch of Funan was a woman known as Liu-ye, and that a foreigner named Hun-tian — Chinese transcription of Kaundinya — arrived in Funan and married Liu-ye. The 7th-century History of the Chin gives a similar account. The Book of Liang (7th-century) also states an Indian Brahmin to have arrived in Funan and become king.

The later Cambodian Royal Chronicles, which were compiled in the 18th to 19th centuries, contain several variants of the legend of the Brahmin prince Preah Thong arriving via sea route from Takkasīlā or Indraprastha and his marriage with the Nāga princess Neang Neak. The founding myth also explains the reason why the serpent (Nāga) became an important part of Khmer iconography as is seen thousand years later when this mystical union remained an important part of the court ceremonies at Angkor during the era of the Khmer Empire.

== Modern theories ==
Newly discovered DNA evidence, through DNA sample taken from a protohistoric individual from the Wat Komnou cemetery at the Angkor Borei site in Cambodia, contains evidence of substantial level of South Asian admixture (ca. 40–50%). Radiocarbon dating result on the human bone (95% confidence interval is 78–234 calCE) indicate that this individual lived during the early period of Funan.

The origin of the name Kaundinya of a group of Brahmins has been suggested to be connected to the ancient region of Kalinga (now modern Odisha) based on the fact the early Indian mariners were trading from this region since around 3rd century BC. The copper plate land grants given by the rulers of Kalinga to Kaundinya Brahmins who lived in the Mahendragiri region of Ganjam have also been discovered, with the most notable one being the Ragolu inscription copper plate grant issued by the ruler Nandaprabhanjanavarman of the Pitrbhakta dynasty. Diplomatic relations between Funan and the Murunda dynasty of northern Kalinga existed during 3rd century CE, when King Dhamadamadhara (Dharmatamadharasya) of Murunda received envoy Su-Wu representing King Fan Chan of Funan (225–250 CE).

== Legacy ==
Kaundinya features prominently in the Cambodian legend of Preah Thong and Neang Neak. The Indian Naval Sailing Vessel INSV Kaundinya was inducted at the Naval Base in Karwar on 21 May 2025 and is named Kaundinya in honor of the renowned Indian mariner. The vessel is a recreation of a 5th-century ship depicted in the Ajanta caves, crafted by artisans from Kerala using ancient stitching methods.

Preceded by Queen Soma	King of Funan; 1st century CE	Succeeded by Pán Huàng
