= Funan =

Ancient kingdom in Indochina

- 50 – 627 CE
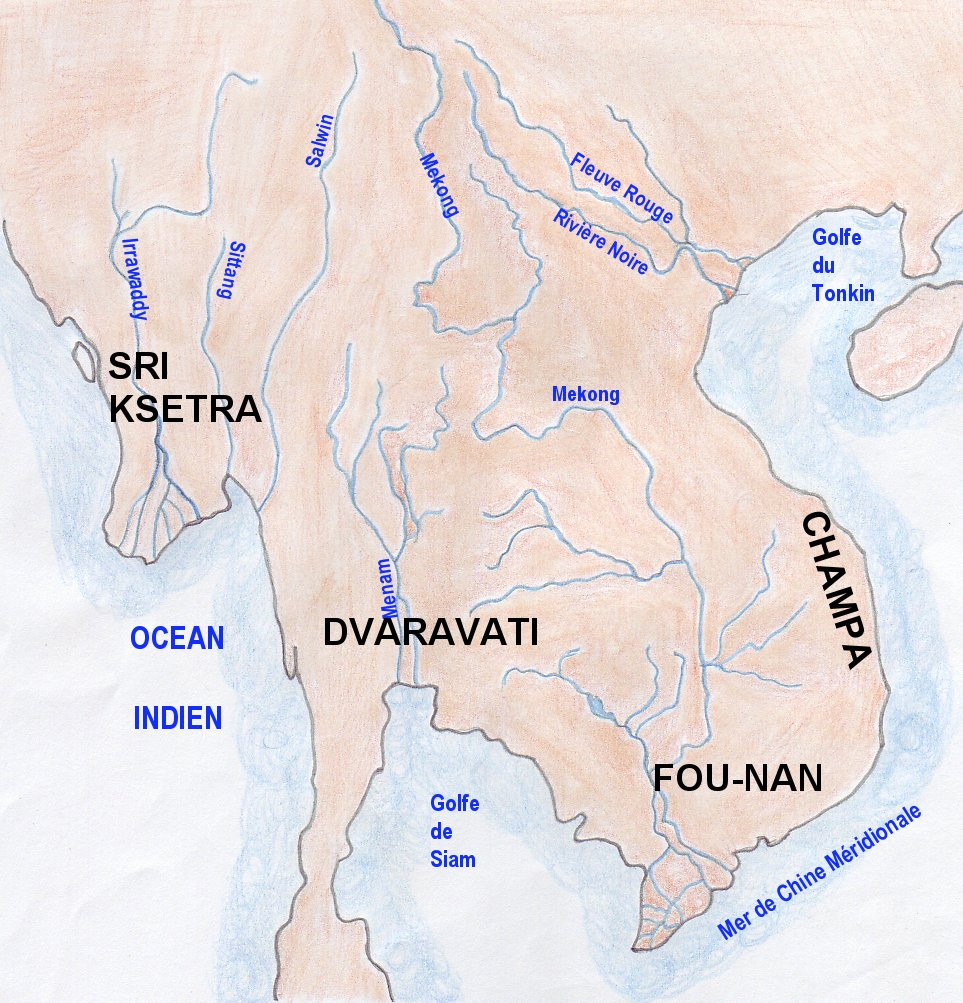
- Map of Indianized kingdoms of Indochina (1st to 7th centuries CE)
- Capital: Vyadhapura
- Common languages: Proto-Khmeric (Note: Later Old Khmer.); (common); Sanskrit; (court and religious)
- Religion: Hinduism; Buddhism
- Government: Mandala kingdom
- Historical era: Classical era
  - Establishment: 50 CE
  - Chenla secession: 550 CE
  - Chenla conquest: 627 CE
- Currency: Native coins
Succeeded by
Chenla
- Today part of: Cambodia; Thailand; Vietnam

Funan (Note: In Chinese: 扶南; pinyin: Fúnán, also Chinese: 夫南; Vietnamese: Phù Nam; Khmer: ហ៊្វូណន, romanized: Hvunân, Khmer pronunciation: [fuːnɑːn]; Thai: ฟูนาน, Thai pronunciation: [fuː.nan]; Sanskrit: व्याधपूर, romanized: Vyādhapūra)) was a loose network of ancient Indianized states (mandalas) located in Mainland Southeast Asia, covering parts of present-day Cambodia, Thailand and Vietnam, that existed from the 1st to the 7th century CE. It was located southwest of Linyi, the Chinese designation for the historical region of Champa in present-day central and southern Vietnam. Funan is generally considered the first known kingdom in Southeast Asia.

Funan is known in the ancient languages of the region as Suvarnabhumi, from Sanskrit, meaning "land of gold", and in Chinese as 扶南 (pinyin: Fúnán). However, the name Funan does not appear in any locally produced texts from the period, and it remains unknown what name the people of Funan used for their polity. It appears in Chinese historical texts describing the kingdom, and the most extensive accounts are largely based on reports by two Chinese diplomats, Kang Tai and Zhu Ying, who represented the Eastern Wu dynasty and sojourned in Funan during the mid-3rd century CE.

Based on Chinese historical accounts, Funan is believed to have been established in the 1st century CE in the Mekong Delta. According to the epigraphic and Chinese texts, it was founded by legendary monarchs Soma and Kaundinya who are held to be the first kings of Cambodia. However, archaeological research indicates that extensive human settlement in the region may date back as far as the 4th century BCE. Although Chinese authors described Funan as a single unified polity, some modern scholars argue that it may instead have been a collection of city-states that were at times in conflict and at other times politically united.

Like the kingdom's name, the ethno-linguistic identity of its people remains a subject of considerable scholarly debate. The leading hypotheses suggest that the Funanese were primarily Mon–Khmer, primarily Austronesian, or part of a multi-ethnic and multi-linguistic society. The available evidence remains inconclusive.

Archaeological evidence, including Roman, Chinese, and Indian goods excavated at the ancient mercantile center of Óc Eo in southern Vietnam, indicates that Funan was a powerful trading state. Excavations at Angkor Borei in southern Cambodia have likewise revealed evidence of an important settlement. Because Óc Eo was connected both to a coastal port and to Angkor Borei through a system of canals, it is possible that these locations together formed the heartland of Funan.

== Etymology ==
The origin and meaning of the word Funan is disputed. It has been suggested that the name Funan (Middle Chinese pronunciation of 扶南: /bju nậm/, Later Han pronunciation: /buɑ nəm/) represents a transcription from a local language into Chinese. George Cœdès specifically suggested that ancient Chinese scholars were transcribing a term related to the Khmer word bnaṃ or vnaṃ (modern: phnoṃ), meaning "mountain".

It has also been noted that, in Chinese, the character 南 (pinyin: nán; Vietnamese: nam) is frequently used in geographical terms to mean "South". Chinese scholars used it in this sense when naming other locations and regions in Southeast Asia, such as Annam. Some scholars argue that ancient Chinese scholars derived their understanding from records in the Yuán Shǐ, the historical records of the Yuan dynasty: "Siem Kok and Lo Hu Kok, formerly the Kingdom of Funan, were located to the west of Linyi Kok (the Champa Kingdom in central Vietnam). The maritime distance from the capital of Linyi Kok to the capital of Funan Kok was about 3,000 li."

Some scholars propose that Funan may itself have been an endonym used by its inhabitants and perhaps a Chinese rendering of the Proto-Khmeric term bnaṃ ("mountain"). However, the epigraphist Claude Jacques argued that this explanation was based on a mistranslation of the Sanskrit word parvatabùpála in ancient inscriptions as equivalent to the Khmer word bnaṃ, as well as a misidentification of King Bhavavarman I as the conqueror of Funan.

As a result, Funan may have been an originally Chinese term rather than a transcription of a local name. Jacques therefore proposed abandoning the use of the name Funan in favor of names such as Bhavapura, Aninditapura, Shresthapura, and Vyadhapura, which are attested in inscriptions as contemporary names for cities in the region. By contrast, the names Funan and Chenla are not known from Old Khmer sources.

== Sources ==
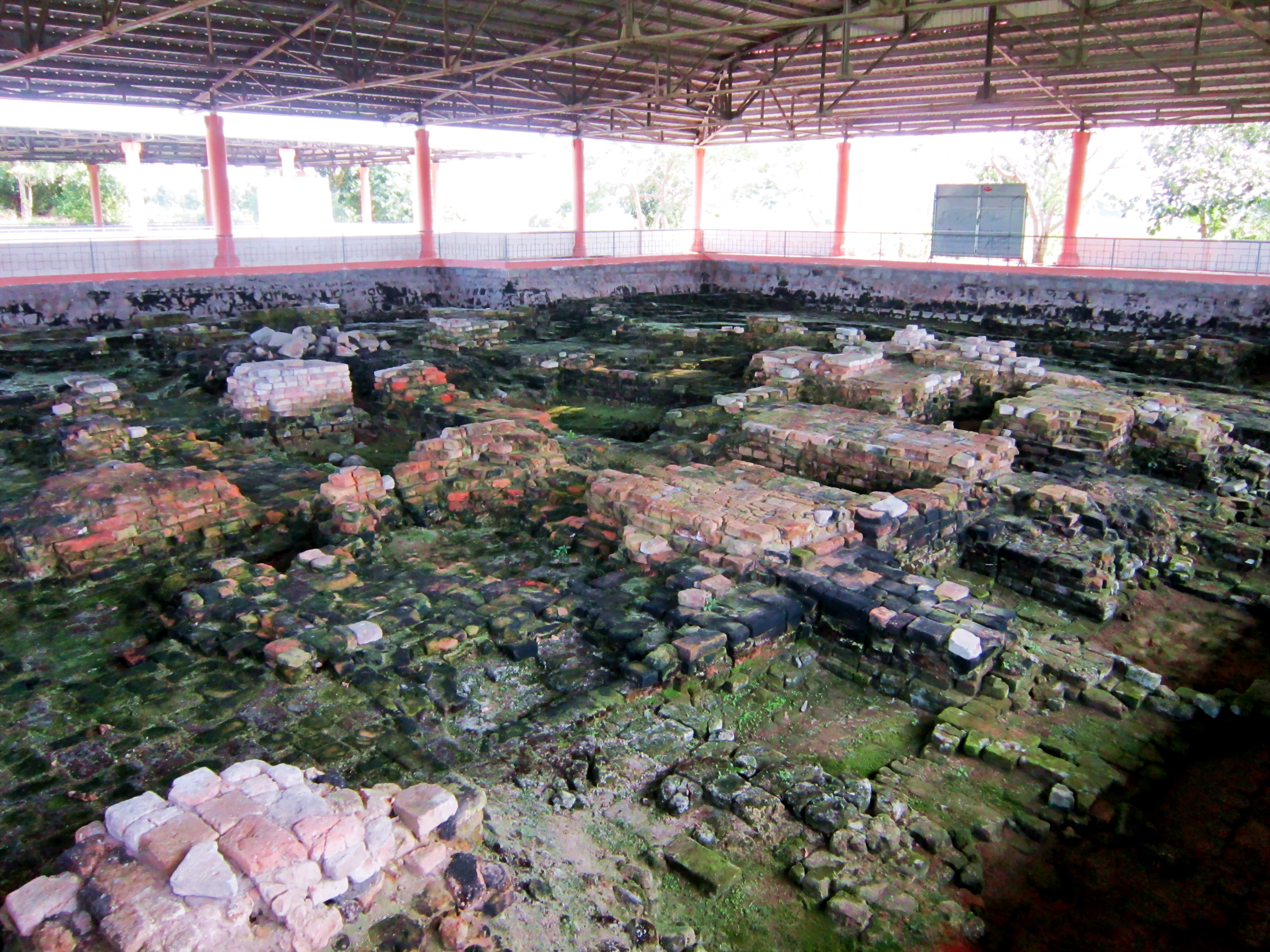
The archeological site of Go Cay Thi, Oc Eo

The first modern scholar to reconstruct the history of the ancient polity of Funan was Paul Pelliot, who in his ground-breaking article "Le Fou-nan" of 1903 drew exclusively on Chinese historical records to set forth the sequence of documented events connecting the foundation of Funan in approximately the 1st century CE with its demise by conquest in the 6th to 7th century. Scholars critical of Pelliot's Chinese sources have expressed scepticism regarding his conclusions.

First record dated 84 CE in late Han period 后汉书. Chinese records dating from the 3rd century CE, beginning with the Records of the Three Kingdoms completed in 289 CE by Chén Shòu (233–297), record the arrival of two Funanese embassies at the court of Lü Dai, a governor in the southern Chinese state of Eastern Wu: the first embassy arrived between 225 and 230 CE, the second in the year 243. Later sources such as the Book of Liang of Yáo Chá (姚察; 533–606) and Yáo Sīlián (d. 637), completed in 636, discuss the mission of the 3rd-century Chinese envoys Kang Tai and Zhū Yīng (朱應) from the state of Wu to Funan. The writings of these envoys, though no longer extant in their original condition, were excerpted and as such preserved in the later dynastic histories, and form the basis for much of what we know about Funan.

Since the publication of Pelliot's article, archaeological excavation in Vietnam and Cambodia, especially excavation of sites related to the Óc Eo culture, have supported and supplemented his conclusion.

== History ==
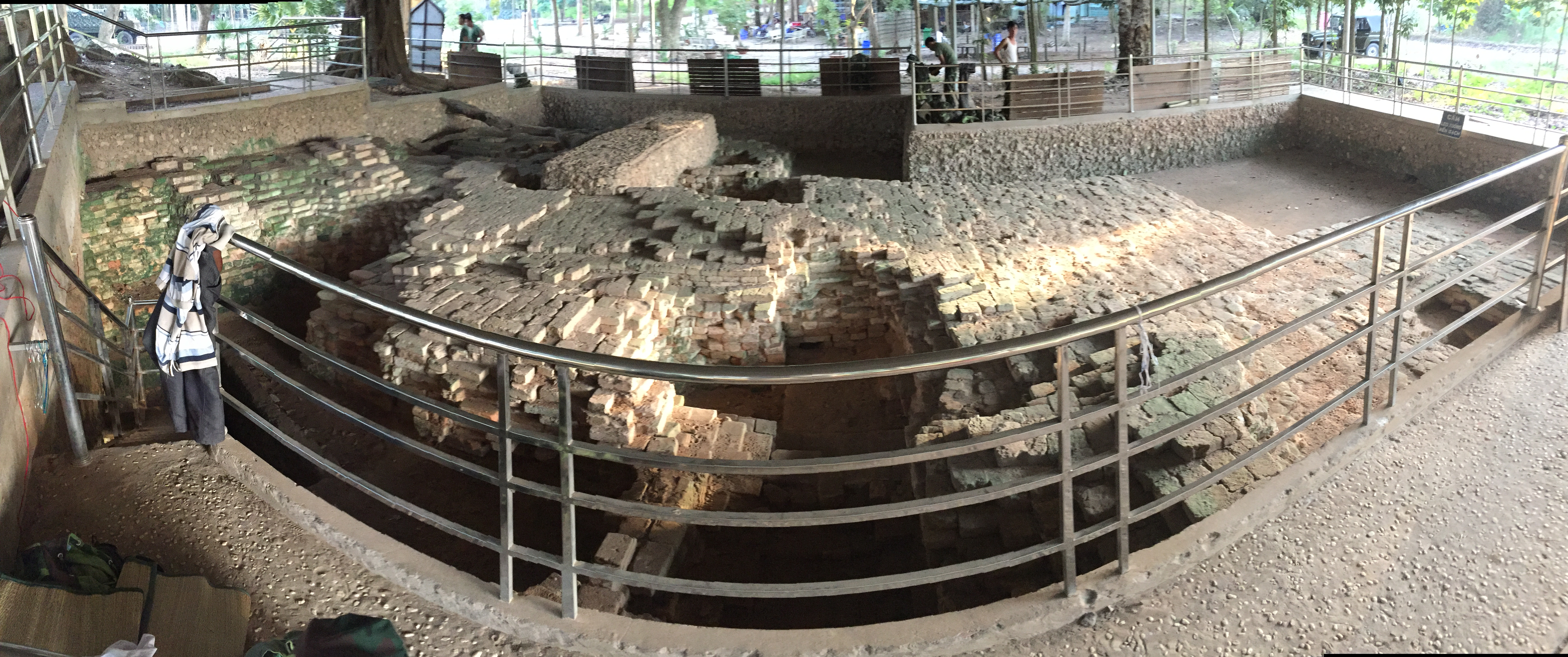
The archaeological site of Go Thap Muoi, Đồng Tháp

=== Origins of Funan ===
Chinese sources relate a local legend to document Funan's origin, that a foreigner named "Huntian" (混填, pinyin: Hùntián) established the Kingdom of Funan around the 1st century CE in the Mekong Delta of southern Vietnam. Archeological evidence shows that extensive human settlement in the region may go as far back as the 4th century BCE. Though treated by Chinese historians as a single unified empire, according to some modern scholars Funan may have been a collection of city-states that sometimes warred with one another and at other times constituted a political unity.

The ethnic and linguistic origins of the Funanese people have consequently been subject to scholarly debate, and no firm conclusions can be drawn based on the evidence available. Michael Vickery argued that, although identifying the language of Funan with certainty is impossible, the evidence strongly suggests that the population was Khmer. However, several studies indicate that the inhabitants of Funan may have spoken Austroasiatic languages, while Malayo-Polynesian languages were spoken in neighboring Champa. The Funanese may have been either Cham, Khmer or from another Austronesian or Austroasiatic group. It is possible that they are the ancestors of those indigenous people dwelling in the southern part of Vietnam today who refer themselves as Khmer or Khmer Krom. The Khmer term "krom" means "below" or "lower part of" and is used to refer to territory that was later colonized by Vietnamese immigrants and taken up into the modern state of Vietnam. Archaeological findings at Óc Eo have demonstrated "no true discontinuity between Óc Eo and pre-Angkorian levels", suggesting Khmer linguistic dominance in areas under Funan's control. Recent archaeological research lends weight to the conclusion that Funan was a Mon-Khmer polity. In his Funan review, Michael Vickery expresses himself a strong supporter of Funan's Khmer predominance theory.

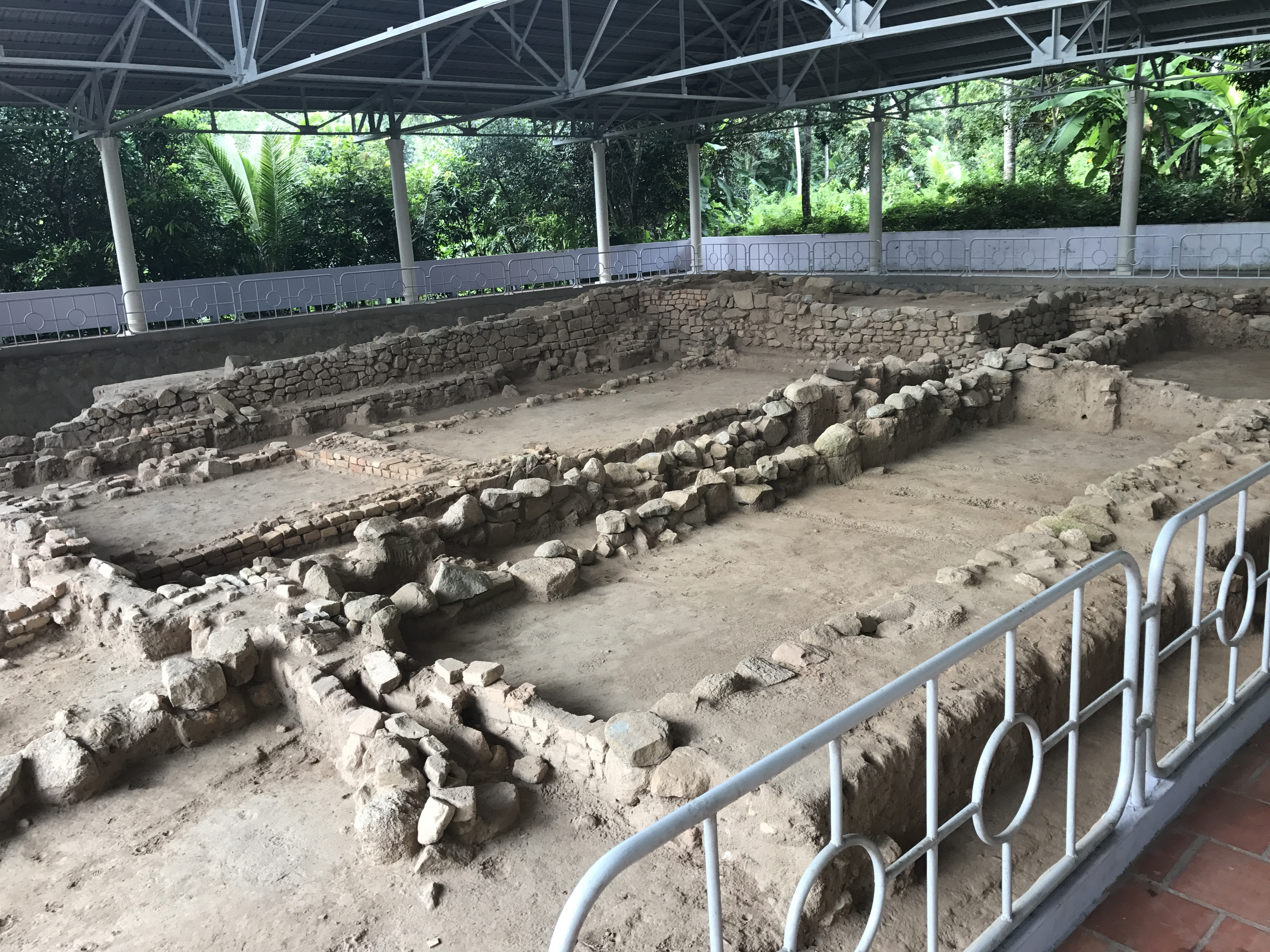
Ruins of Nam Linh Son, Oc Eo

Whether Funan's ethnolinguistic components were Austronesian or Austroasiatic remains inconclusive. The majority of Vietnamese academics believes them to be Austronesians. For example, Mac Duong, stipulates that "Funan's core population certainly were the Austronesians, not Khmer;" the fall of Funan and the rise of Zhenla from the north in the 6th century indicate "the arrival of the Khmer to the Mekong Delta." That thesis received support from D. G. E. Hall.

It is also possible that Funan was a multicultural society, including various ethnic and linguistic groups. In the late 4th and 5th centuries, Indianization advanced more rapidly, in part through renewed impulses from the south Indian Pallava dynasty and the north Indian Gupta Empire. The only extant local writings from the period of Funan are paleographic Pallava Grantha inscriptions in Sanskrit of the Pallava dynasty, a scholarly language used by learned and ruling elites throughout South and Southeast Asia. These inscriptions give no information about the ethnicity or vernacular tongue of the Funanese.

Funan may have been the Suvarnabhumi referred to in ancient Indian texts. Among the Khmer Krom of the lower Mekong region the belief is held that they are the descendants of ancient Funan, the core of Suvarnabhumi/Suvarnadvipa, which covered a vast extent of Southeast Asia including present day Cambodia, southern Vietnam, Thailand, Laos, Burma, Malaya, Sumatra and other parts of Indonesia. In December 2017, Dr Vong Sotheara, of the Royal University of Phnom Penh, discovered a Pre-Angkorian stone inscription in the Province of Kampong Speu Baset District, which he tentatively dated to 633 CE. According to him, the inscription would “prove that Suvarnabhumi was the Khmer Empire.” The inscription, translated, read: “The great King Isanavarman is full of glory and bravery. He is the King of Kings, who rules over Suvarnabhumi until the sea, which is the border, while the kings in the neighbouring states honour his order to their heads”.

=== Foundation legends ===
==== Epigraphic sources ====
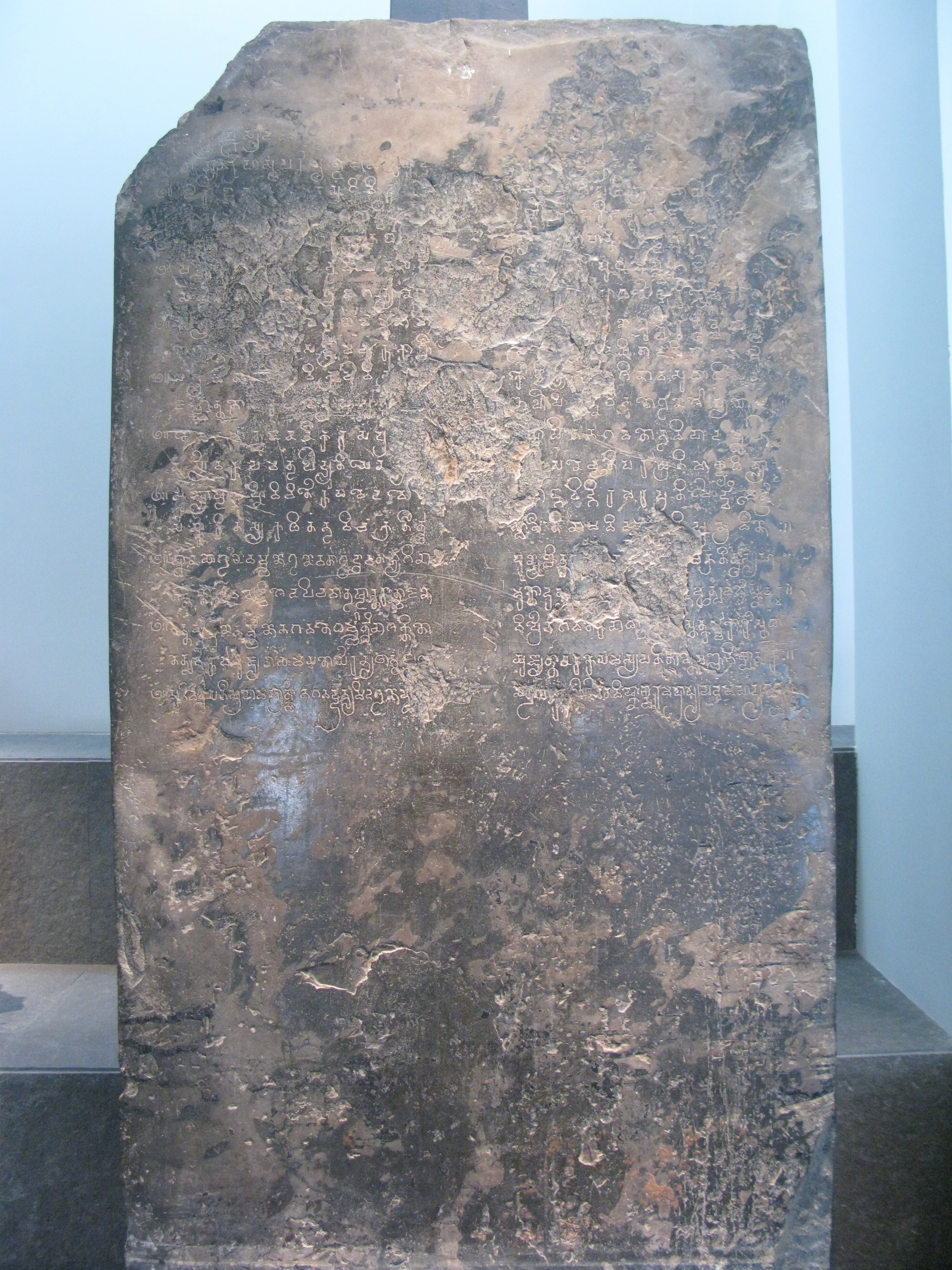
This stele found at Tháp Mười in Đồng Tháp Province, Vietnam and now located in the Museum of History in Ho Chi Minh City is one of the few extant writings that can be attributed confidently to the kingdom of Funan. The text is in Sanskrit, written in Grantha script of the Pallava dynasty, dated to the mid-5th century CE, and tells of a donation in honour of Vishnu by a Prince Gunavarman of the Kaundinya lineage.

Some scholars have identified the conqueror Hùntián of the Book of Liang with the Brahmin Kauṇḍinya who married a nāga (snake) princess named Somā, as set forth in a Sanskrit inscription found at Mỹ Sơn and dated 658 CE. The Sanskrit inscription (K.5) of Tháp Mười (known as "Prasat Pram Loven" in Khmer), which is now on display in the Museum of Vietnamese History in Ho Chi Minh City, refers to a Prince Guṇavarman, younger son (nṛpasunu—bālo pi) of a king Ja[yavarman] who was "the moon of the Kauṇḍinya line (... kauṇḍi[n]ya[vaṅ]śaśaśinā ...) and chief "of a realm wrested from the mud".

==== Chinese accounts ====
The Book of Liang records a local legend to document Funan's origin, that of the foundation of Funan by the foreigner Hùntián (混塡, Middle Chinese pronunciation /ɦwən^{x} tɦian/): "He came from the southern country Jiào (徼, an unidentified location, perhaps on the Malaysian Peninsula or in the Indonesian archipelago) after dreaming that his personal genie had delivered a divine bow to him and had directed him to embark on a large merchant junk. In the morning, he proceeded to the temple, where he found a bow at the foot of the genie's tree. He then boarded a ship, which the genie caused to land in Fúnán. The queen of the country, Liǔyè (柳葉, "Willow Leaf"; Queen Soma, Middle Chinese: Iiu-iap) wanted to pillage the ship and seize it, so Hùntián shot an arrow from his divine bow which pierced through Liǔyè's ship. Frightened, she gave herself up, and Hùntián took her for his wife. But unhappy to see her naked, he folded a piece of material to make a garment through which he made her pass her head. Then he governed the country and passed power on to his son, who was the founder of seven cities." Nearly the same story appeared in the Book of Jin, compiled by Fáng Xuánlíng in 648 CE; however, in the Book of Jin the names given to the foreign conqueror and his native wife are "Hùnhuì" 混湏 and "Yèliǔ" 葉柳.

Some scholars have rejected identification of Hùntián with Kaundinya, pointing out that the word "Hùntián" has only two syllables, while the word "Kauṇḍinya" has three, and arguing that Chinese scholars would not have used a two-syllable Chinese word to transcribe a three-syllable word from another language. However, even if the Chinese "Hùntián" is not the proper transcription of the Sanskrit "Kaundinya", the name "Kaundinya" [Kauṇḍinya, Koṇḍañña, Koṇḍinya, etc.] is nevertheless an important one in the history of Funan. Chinese sources mention another person of the name "Qiáochénrú" (僑陳如). A person of that name is mentioned in the Book of Liang in a story that appears somewhat after the story of Hùntián. According to this source, Qiáochénrú was one of the successors of the king Tiānzhú Zhāntán (天竺旃檀, "Candana from India"), a ruler of Funan who in the year 357 CE sent tamed elephants as tribute to Emperor Mu of Jin (r. 344–361): "He [Qiáochénrú] was originally a Brahmin from India. There a voice told him: 'you must go reign over Fúnán,' and he rejoiced in his heart. In the south, he arrived at Pánpán (盤盤). The people of Fúnán appeared to him; the whole kingdom rose up with joy, went before him, and chose him king. He changed all the laws to conform to the system of India."

==== Cambodian foundation legend ====
The legend of Kaundinya is paralleled in modern Khmer folklore, where the foreign prince is known as "Preah Thaong" and the queen as "Neang Neak". According to the legend of Preah Thong and Neang Neak, Preah Thaong arrives by sea to an island marked by a giant thlok tree, native to Cambodia. On the island, he finds the home of the nāgas and meets Neang Neak, daughter of the nāga king. He marries her with blessings from her father and returns to the human world. The nāga king drinks the sea around the island and confers the name "Kampuchea Thipdei", which is derived from the Sanskrit (Kambujādhipati) and may be translated into English as "the lord of Cambodia". In another version, it is stated that Preah Thaong fights Neang Neak.

==== Interpretation of the legends ====
Kenneth Hall remarks that the basic details of the Chinese legend are reiterated elsewhere in Indian and Southeast Asian folklore.

The historian Gabriel Ferrand believed that some Indian merchants might have immigrated to the region and established relations with the natives and that's how the myth emerged. Some Indian historians have exaggerated the accounts and speculate that a large population of South Asians colonized Funan. Dutch historian J.C. van Leur stressed that it was the local rulers who recognized the benefits of associating with their relatively advanced social technologies and drew from the Indian traditions by encouraging migration of Brahmin clerks to help with the administration.

Historian O.W. Wolters states that it was rather the Indianized local Southeast Asian traders, not Indian Brahmins, who provided the initial contact with Indian cultural traditions and the local rulers followed up. As per O.W. Wolters, there was a mutual sharing process in the evolution of Indianized statecraft and no mass influx of Brahmans. He said that it was rather the Indianized local Southeast Asian traders who provided the initial contact with Indian cultural traditions and the local rulers followed up. He also stated that Hindu traditions was selectively mobilized by the local rulers to strengthen the political alliances among fragile polity of the states in that period.

=== Apex and decline of Funan ===
Successive rulers following Hun-t'ien included Hun-p'an-huang, P'an-p'an, and then Fan Shih-man, "Great King of Funan", who "had large ships built, and sailing all over the immense sea he attacked more than ten kingdoms ... he extended his territory five or six thousand li." Fan Shih-man died on a military expedition to Chin-lin, "Frontier of Gold". He was followed by Chin-cheng, Fan Chan, Ch'ang and then Fan Hsun, in successive assassinations. Before his death, Fan Chan sent embassies to India and China in 243.

Around 245, Funan was described as having "walled villages, palaces, and dwellings. They devote themselves to agriculture ... they like to engrave ornaments and chisel. Many of their eating utensils are silver. Taxes are paid in gold, silver, pearls, perfumes. There are books and depositories of archives and other things." The Indianised ruler Chan-T'an was ruling in 357, followed by another Indianised ruler Chiao Chen-ju (Kaundinya) in the fifth century, who "changed all the laws to conform to the system of India." In 480, She-yeh-pa-mo, Jayavarman or "Protege of Victory" reigned until his death in 514. One of his sons, Rudravarman, killed the other, Gunavarman, for the throne, and became the last king of Funan.

Funan reached the apex of its power under the 3rd-century king Fan Shiman (pinyin: Fàn Shīmàn). Fan Shiman expanded his empire's navy and improved the Funanese bureaucracy, creating a quasi-feudal pattern that left local customs and identities largely intact, particularly in the empire's further reaches. Fan Shiman and his successors also sent ambassadors to China and India to regulate sea trade. The kingdom likely accelerated the process of Indianization of Southeast Asia. Later kingdoms of Southeast Asia such as Chenla may have emulated the Funanese court. The Funanese established a strong system of mercantilism and commercial monopolies that would become a pattern for empires in the region.

Funan's dependence on maritime trade is seen as a cause for the beginning of Funan's downfall. Their coastal ports allowed trade with foreign regions that funnelled goods to the north and coastal populations. However, the shift in maritime trade to Sumatra, the rise in the Srivijaya trade empire, and the taking of trade routes all throughout Southeast Asia by China, leads to economic instability in the south, and forces politics and economy northward.

Funan was superseded and absorbed in the 6th century by the Khmer polity of the Chenla Kingdom (Zhenla). "The king had his capital in the city of T'e-mu. Suddenly his city was subjugated by Chenla, and he had to migrate south to the city of Nafuna" (Middle Chinese: *nâ-piiidt-nâ).

Stephen Murphy and Miriam Stark read the archaeology of the delta as showing continuity rather than a break. On their account pre-Angkorian settlement in Cambodia emerged directly out of the polity the Chinese sources call Funan.

Nicolas Revire reads the same change as a shift in where power sat rather than as a simple conquest. The early coastal Funan rulers had legendary links to the Indianised cultures of the Thai-Malay peninsula. On his account their power was presumably displaced by inland Khmer rulers from about the middle of the sixth or the early seventh century. That is just before, or at the beginning of, the rise of what is called Dvāravatī and Zhenla. He also treats as reasonable the older suggestion that Funan was the catalyst for the development of Dvāravatī, since similar artefacts and sculptures occur in both areas. The legends of Funan and the Chinese annals support a link between the two areas without demonstrating one.

The name has also been used as a period label for early sites in central Thailand, and Stephen A. Murphy argues that it should not be. Bennet Bronson classified the phase of about 200 to 450 or 500 CE at Chan Sen as Funan-related. Pottery of the Vat Komnou style at Angkor Borei, of about 200 BCE to 300 CE, resembles the ware he called Funanese. On the comparative material gathered since, Murphy holds that the ceramics of Nakhon Pathom show trade contact only and not the overlordship earlier scholarship assumed, and that the material Bronson and Jean Boisselier called Funanese is closer to Dvaravati material.

The Book of Sui (complied in 636) states: "The Kingdom of Zhenla is to the southwest of Linyi and was originally subject to Funan… The surname of its [former] king was that of the Cha-li clan; his given name was Zhiduo-si-na 質多斯那. His ancestors had gradually become more powerful and flourishing until the time of Zhi-duo-sina himself, who annexed Funan and possessed it." The New Book of Tang (c. 1060) tells that "Yīshēnàxiāndài (伊奢那先代), son of Citrasena-Mahendravarman, subdued Funan and annexed Funan territory in the beginning of the Zhenguan era (627–649) [when Emperor Taizong of Tang ruled]."

The first inscription in the Khmer language is dated shortly after the fall of Funan. A concentration of later Khmer inscriptions in southern Cambodia may suggest the even earlier presence of a Khmer population. Despite absence of compelling evidence as to the ethnicity of the Funanese, modern scholar Michael Vickery has stated that "on present evidence it is impossible to assert that Funan as an area and its dominant groups were anything but Khmer".

=== Disintegration ===
According to British Historian Robert Nichol, When Funan kingdom collapsed under Khmer invasions, during the year 680, the Sailendra Dynasty set up rump states of Funan in the small kingdoms of Sarawak in Borneo across the South China sea, from Funan. He also posited blood relations with the Visayans in the Philippines with the Vijaya of Sarawak which in turn cause them to be related to Funan people as well as the Srivijaya Empire.

=== Legacy ===
The "King of the mountain" was the monarch of Funan. There was a mountain regarded as holy. Mountain in Khmer sounds similar to Funan.

The Java-based Sailendras claimed that the Funan monarchs were their ancestors. Cambodia was taken control of after a sojourn in Java by Jayavarman II.

The "Mountain Kings" of Funan were claimed as the forebears of the Malacca Sultanate and Brunei Sultanate.

== Society ==
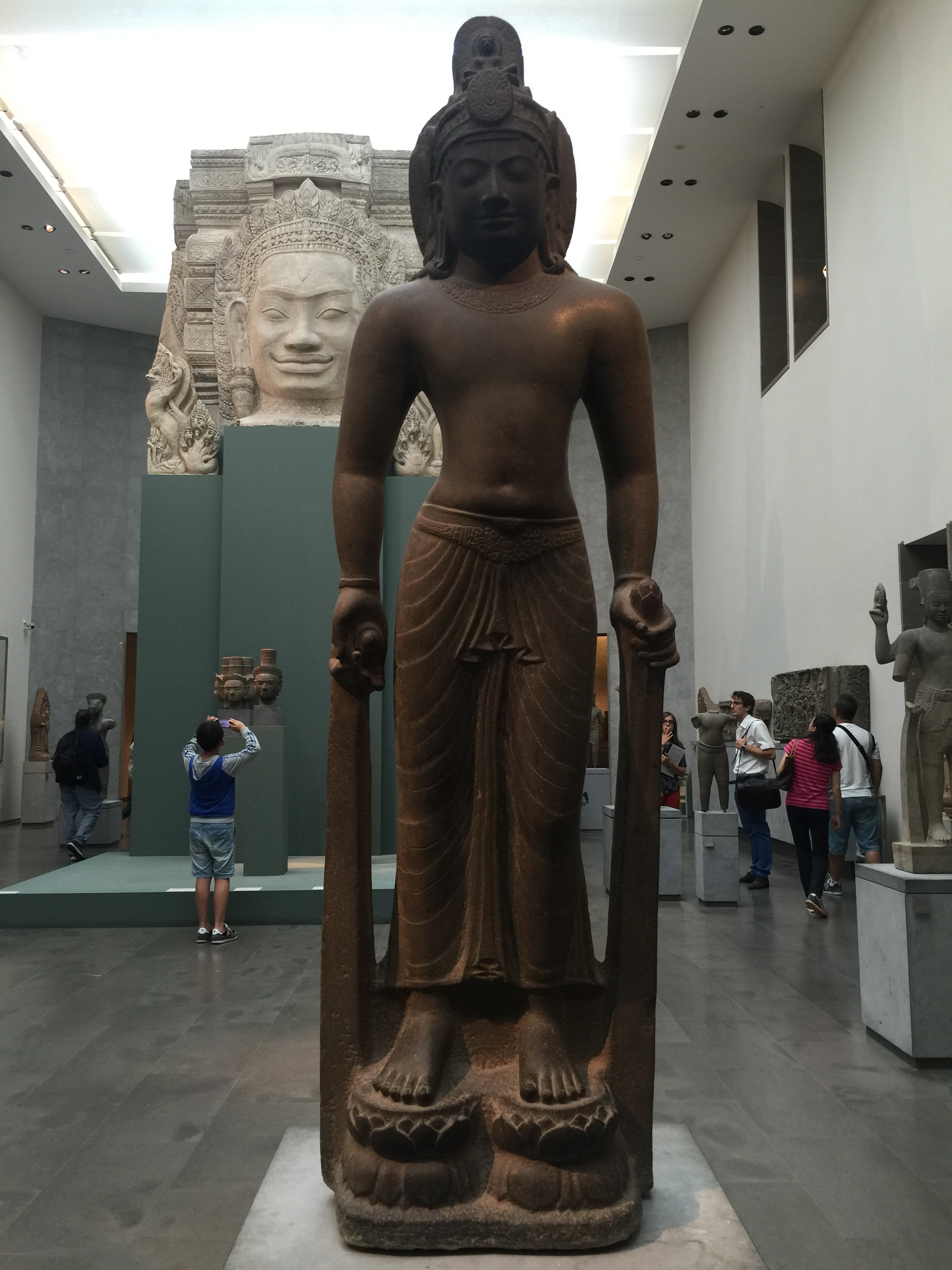
Bodhisattva Lokeshvara of Phnom Da style (7th century), Mỹ Tho. Guimet Museum

Keeping in mind that Funanese records did not survive in the modern period, much of what is known came from archaeological excavation. Excavations yielded discoveries of brick wall structures, precious metals and pot from southern Cambodia and Vietnam. Also found was a large canal system that linked the settlements of Angkor Borei and coastal outlets; this suggests a highly organised government. Funan was a complex and sophisticated society with a high population density, advanced technology, and a complex social system.

=== Capital ===
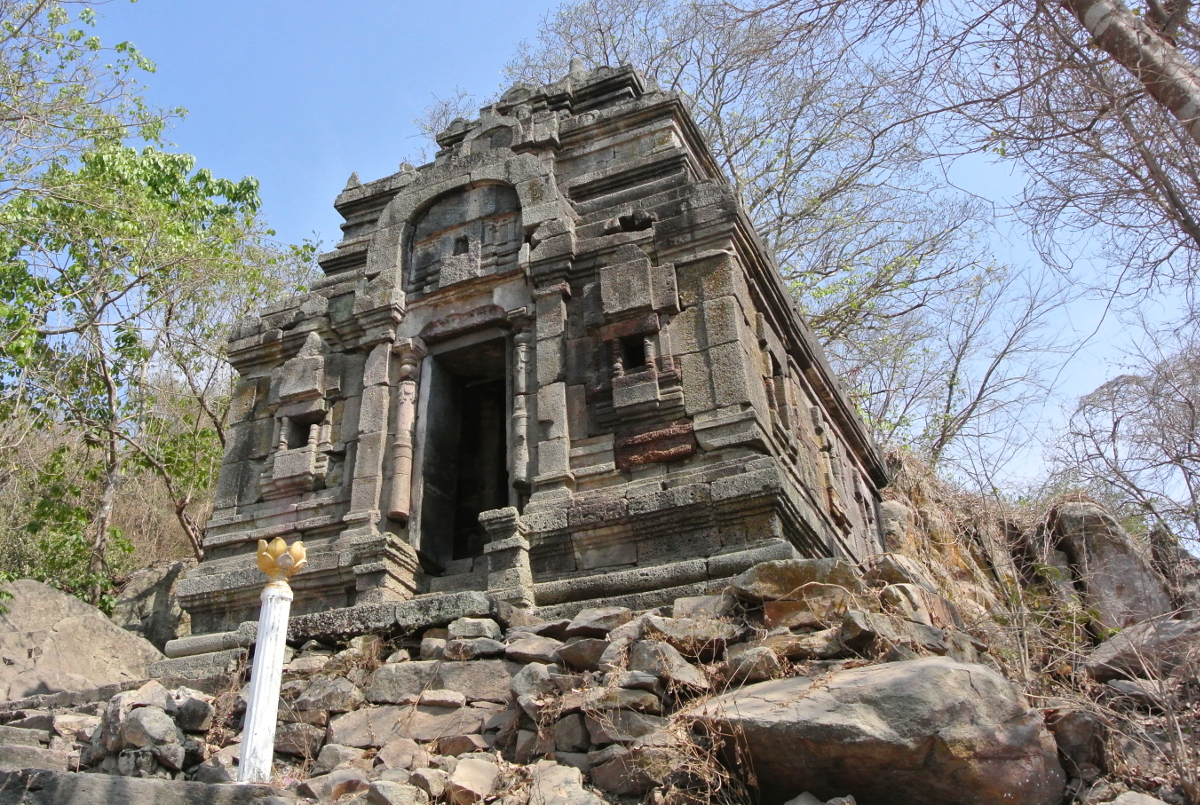
A temple at the archaeological site of Angkor Borei

On the assumption that Funan was a single unified polity, scholars have advanced various linguistic arguments about the location of its "capital".

- One theory, based on the presumed connection between the word "Funan" and the Khmer word "phnom", locates the capital in the vicinity of Ba Phnoṃ near the modern Cambodian town of Banam in Prey Veng Province.
- Another theory, propounded by George Coedès, is that the capital was a town identified in Angkorian inscriptions as "Vyādhapura" (City of the Hunter). Coedès based his theory on a passage in the Chinese histories which identified the capital as "Temu" (特牧, pinyin: Tèmù); Coedès claimed this name represented a transcription from the Khmer word "dalmāk", which he translated as "hunter." This theory has been rejected by other scholars on the grounds that "dalmāk" means "trapper", not "hunter".

Unfortunately, only limited archaeological research has been conducted on Funan in southern Cambodia and Cochinchina in the last few decades, and it is precisely this region that reputedly housed the capital or capitals of Funan. However, archaeological surveys and excavations were carried out by joint Cambodian (Ministry of Culture and Fine Arts; Royal University of Fine Arts) and international teams at Angkor Borei since 1994 continuing into the 2000s. The research included excavation and dating of human burials at Wat Kamnou. Numerous brick features, architectural remains, and landscape features such as mounds, canals and reservoirs have also been identified.

Some have been dated with a wide spectrum of results ranging from the late centuries BCE to the Angkorian period. A significant canal system linking the site of Oc Eo has also been researched and dated. Phon Kaseka led a Royal Academy of Cambodia and Ministry of Culture and Fine Arts team (also with Royal University of Fine Arts personnel) conducted Iron Age to Funan period burial excavations at neighboring Phnom Borei. Large landscape features, notable settlement mounds, and other sites exhibiting Funan material culture and settlement patterns extend from at least Phnom Chisor through Oc Eo and numerous sites in Vietnam. Vietnamese archaeologists have also conducted a fair amount of research on Funan sites in the lower Mekong region.

Many of the mounds show evidence of material culture and landscape modification (inclusive of species-genera biological regimes) ranging from the metal age through the post-Angkorian period and later as evidenced by 13th through 16th century CE Chinese, Thai, Vietnamese, and Cham ceramics. The evidence suggests a 2000-year or longer period of urbanization, continuous activity, and relatively strong albeit indirect and multi-nodal connections to long-distance value chains. Nevertheless, it is quite evident that periods of intense production, consumption, activity, commercial and political centrality fluctuated.

The Funan period seems to have been the heyday and Angkor Borei may have been Funan's premiere capital for much of that period. However, many of the settlements did not necessarily spring up out of nowhere or vanish quickly. They were certainly well integrated into pre-Funan, Funan, Zhenla [Chenla], Angkorian and post-Angkorian socio-economic and political networks. The urbanization and networking processes demonstrate significant continuity, evolution and longevity before and after the typical first to sixth century CE historic classification scheme.

=== Culture ===
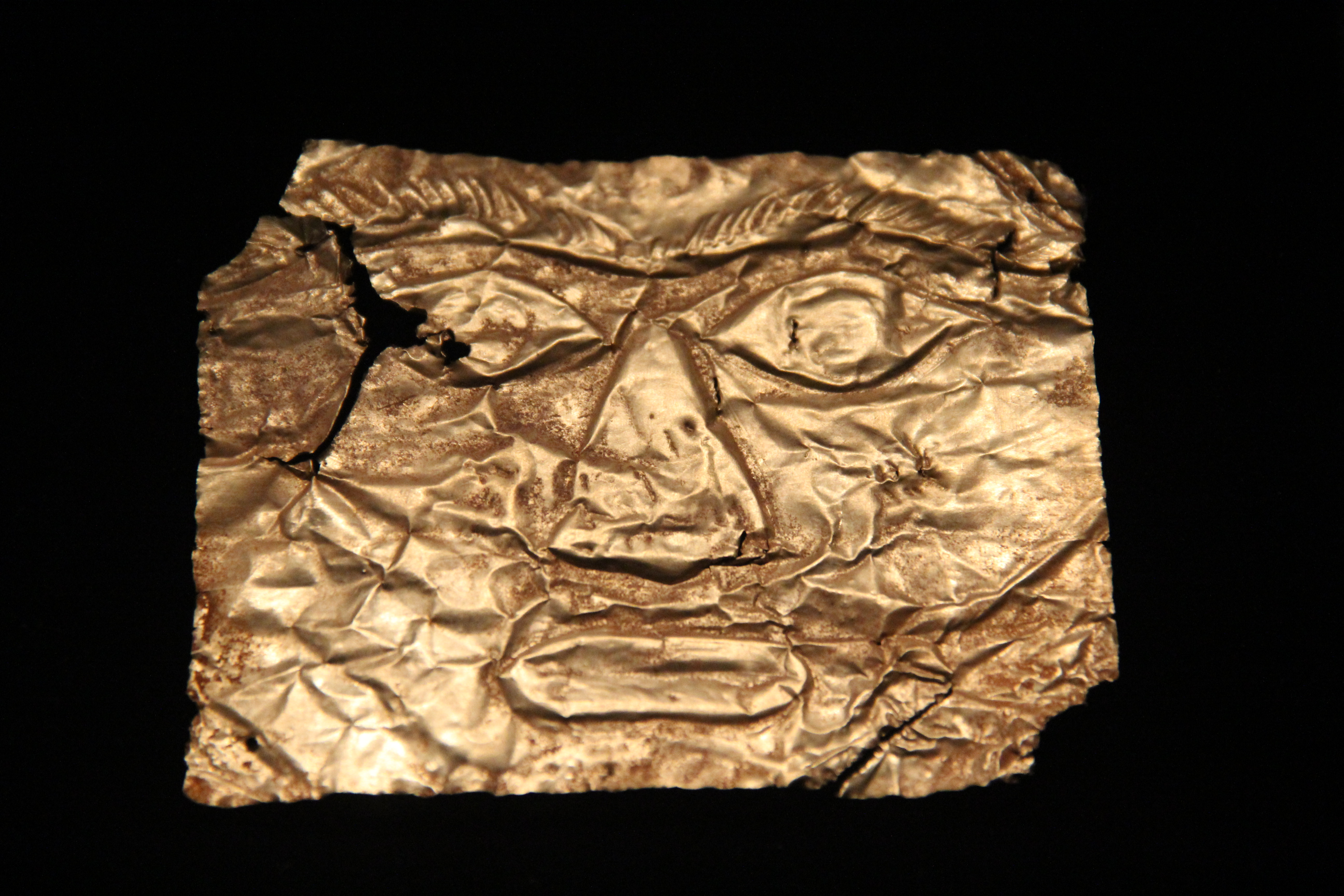
Gold foil at Oc Eo

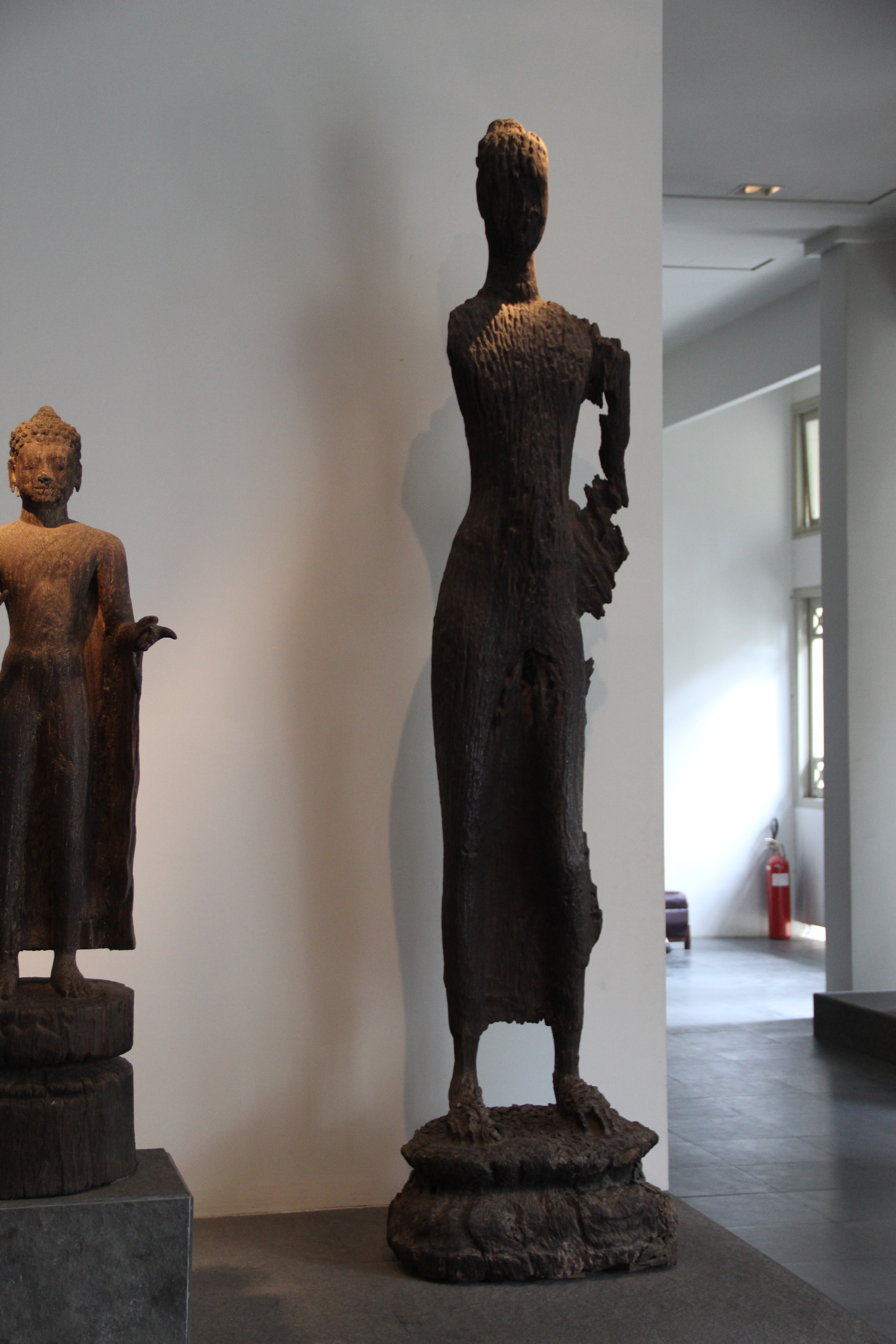
Wooden Buddha statue

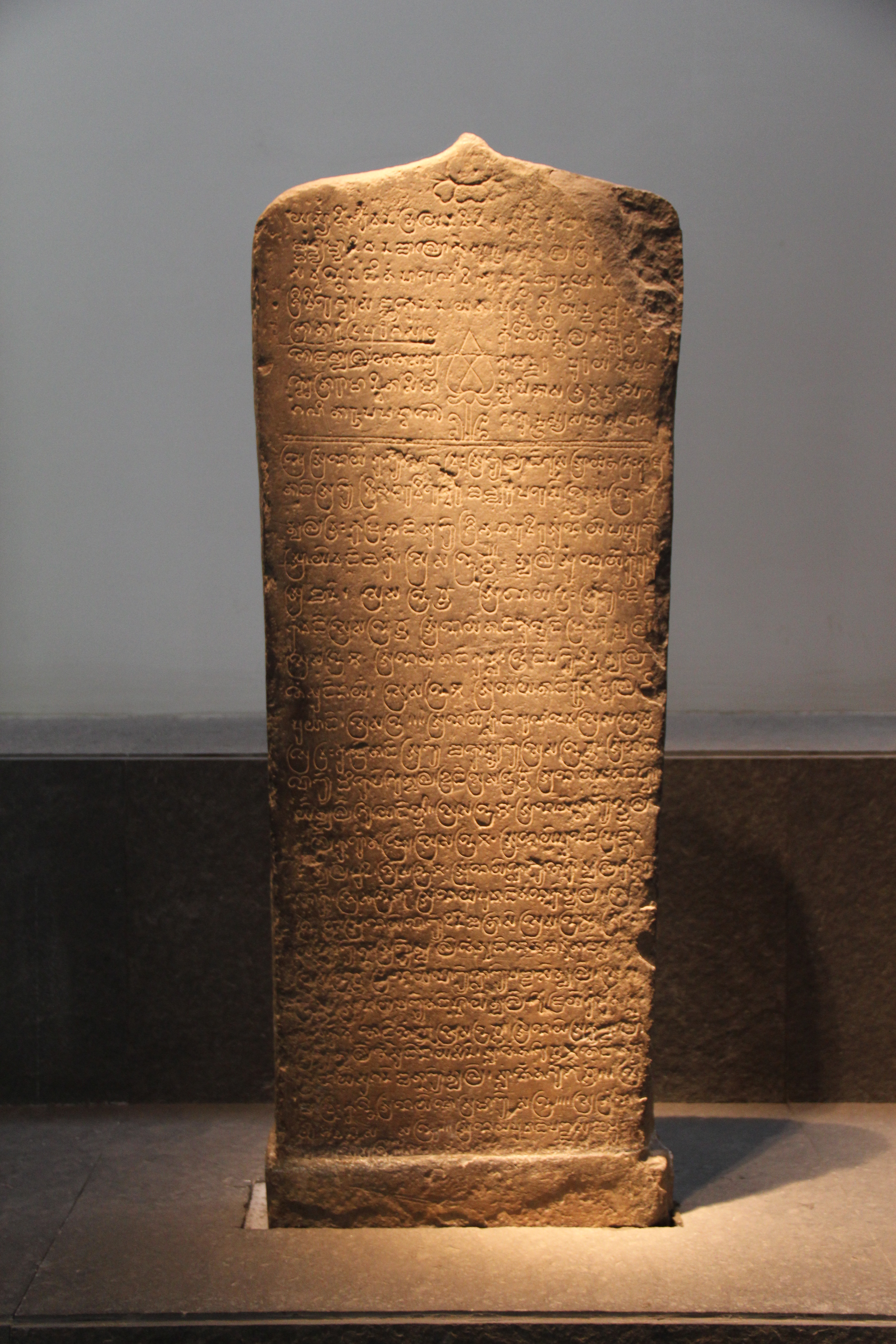
Funanese Sanskrit inscription

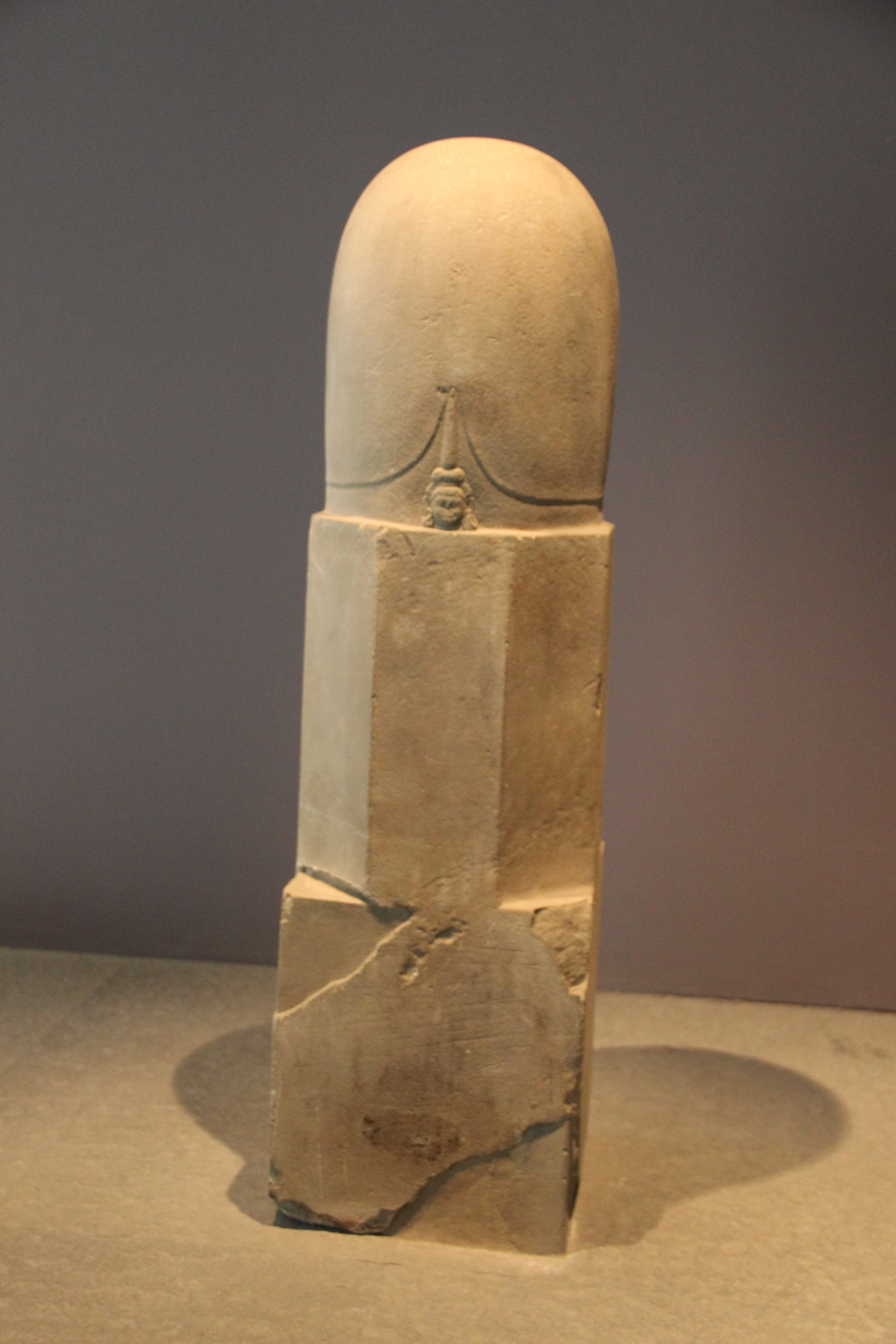
Funan Lingam

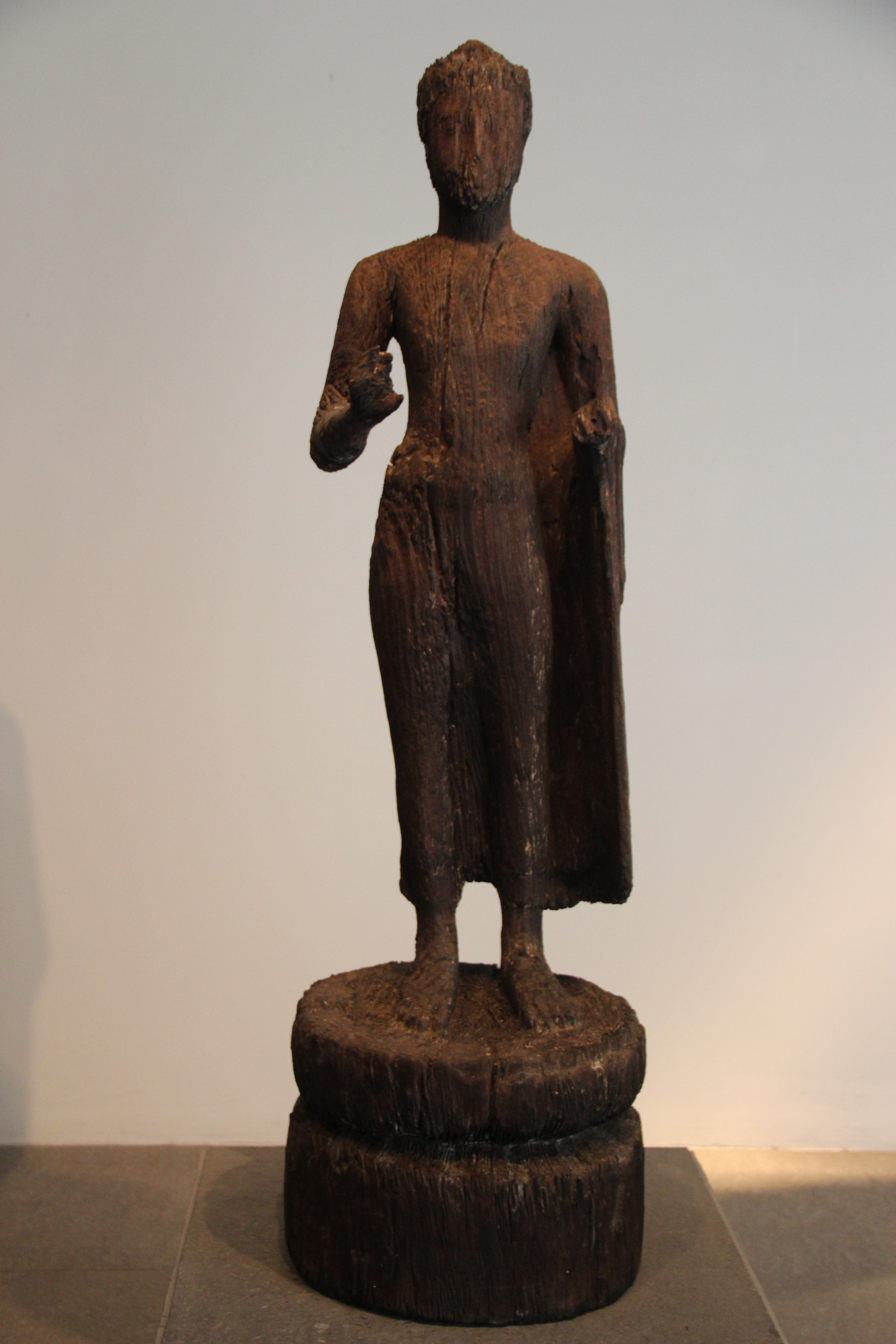
Funanese Buddha statue

Archaeological evidence largely corresponds to Chinese records. The Chinese described the Funanese as people who lived on stilt houses, cultivated rice and sent tributes of gold, silver, ivory and exotic animals.

Kang Tai's report was unflattering to Funanese civilisation, though Chinese court records show that a group of Funanese musicians visited China in 263 CE. The Chinese emperor was so impressed that he ordered the establishment of an institute for Funanese music near Nanking. The Funanese were reported to have extensive book collections and archives throughout their country, demonstrating a high level of scholarly achievements.

Two Buddhist monks from Funan, named Mandrasena and Sanghapala, took up residency in China in the 5th to 6th centuries, and translated several Buddhist sūtras from Sanskrit (or a Prakrit) into Chinese. Among these texts is the Mahayana Saptaśatikā Prajñāpāramitā Sūtra, also called the Mahāprajñāpāramitā Mañjuśrīparivarta Sūtra. This text was separately translated by both monks. The bodhisattva Mañjuśrī is a prominent figure in this text.

=== Economy ===
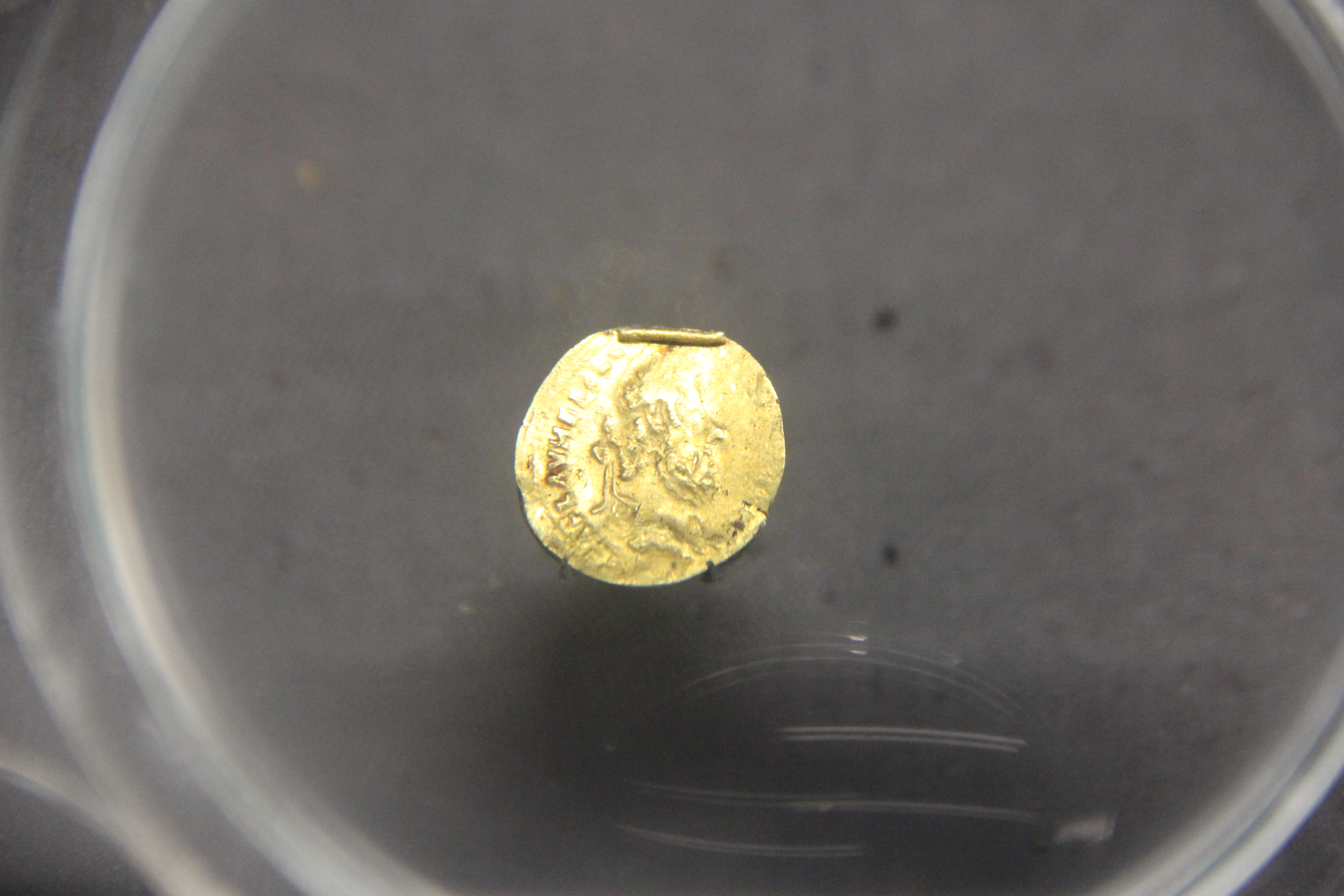
Aureus

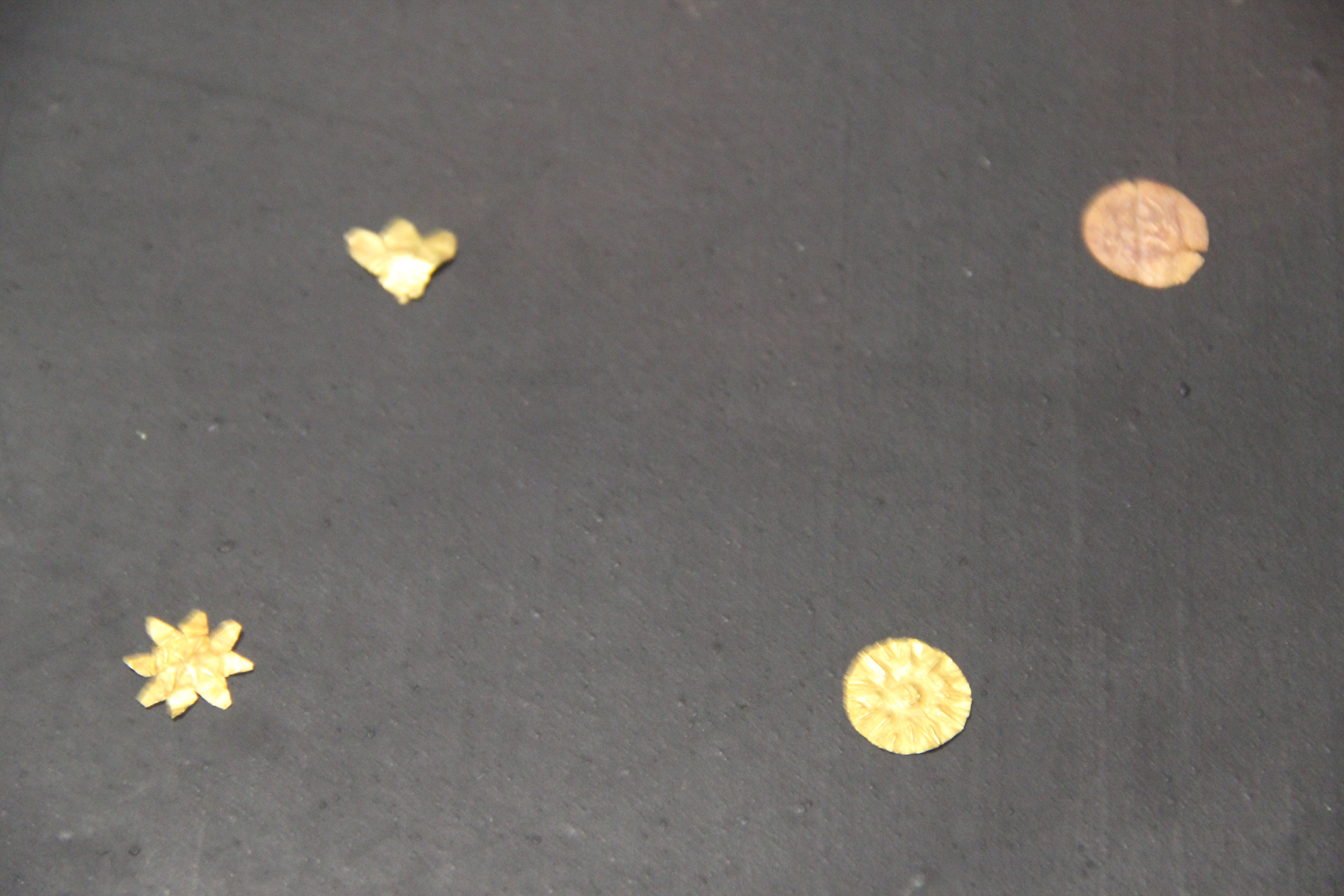
Funanese gold

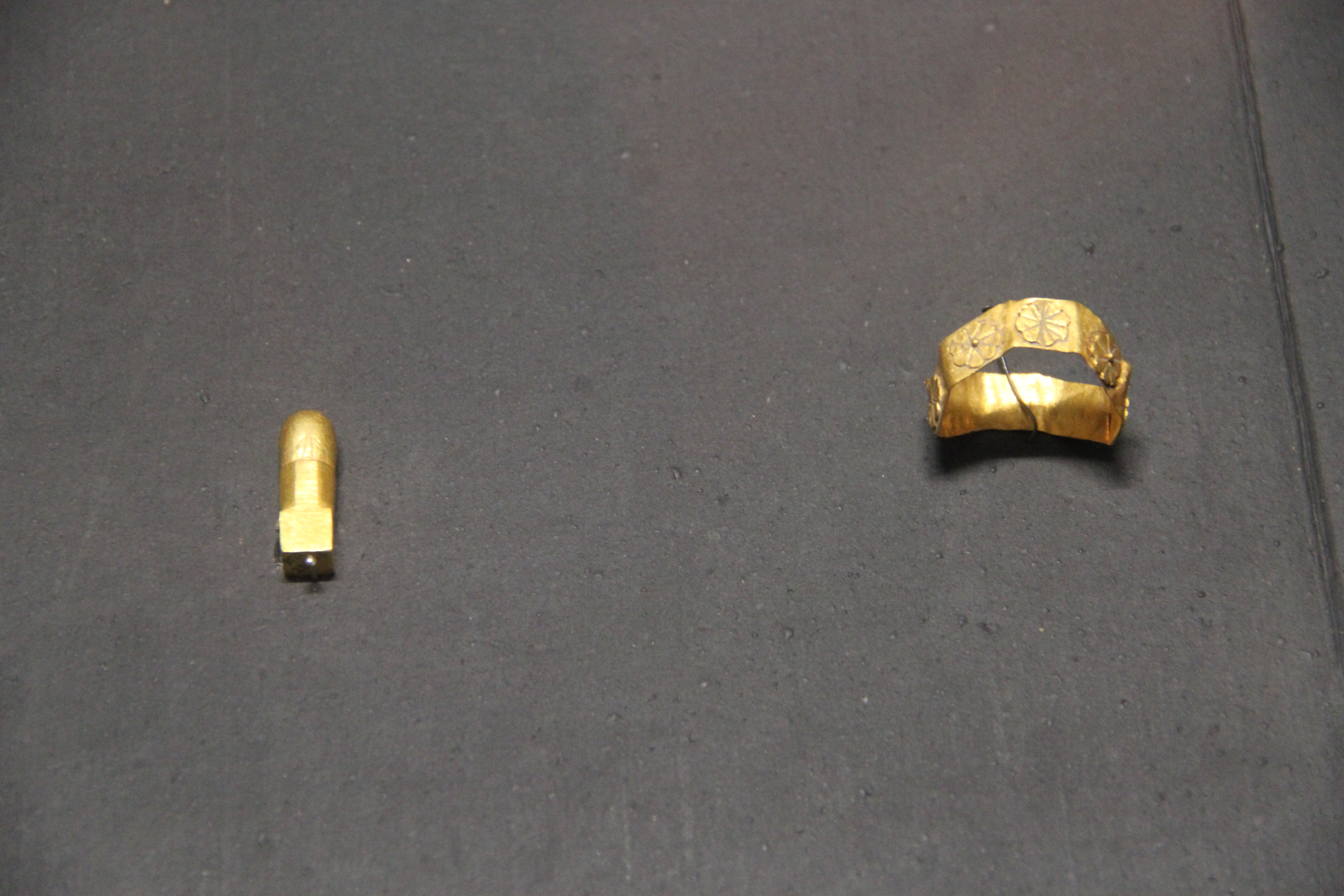
Funanese jewelry

Funanese gold objects. Left: A local imitation of aureus issued by Commodus. Legend: L(ucius) AEL(ius) AVREL(ius) COMMO(odus) AUG(ustus) P(ius) FEL(ix)

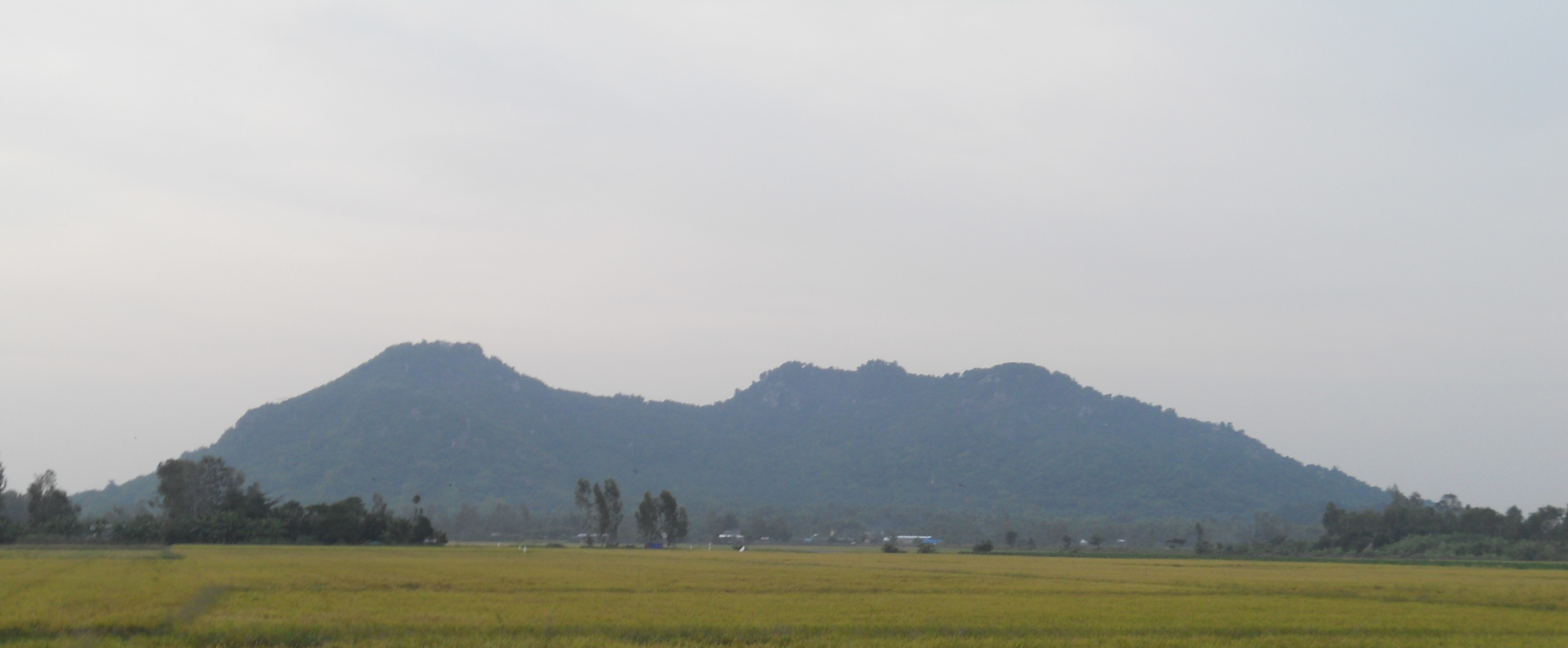
A view of Mount Ba The, Oc Eo, An Giang Province, Vietnam

Funan was Southeast Asia's first great economy. It became prosperous through maritime trade and agriculture. The kingdom apparently minted its own silver coinage, bearing the image of the crested argus or hamsa bird.

Funan came into prominence at a time when the trade route from India to China consisted of a maritime leg from India to the Isthmus of Kra, the narrow portion of the Malay peninsula, a portage across the isthmus, and then a coast-hugging journey by ship along the Gulf of Siam, past the Mekong Delta, and along the Vietnamese coast to China. Funanese kings of the 2nd century conquered polities on the isthmus itself, and thus may have controlled the entire trade route from Malaysia to central Vietnam.

The Funanese settlement of Óc Eo, located near the Straits of Malacca, provided a port-of-call and entrepot for this international trade route. Archaeological evidence discovered at what may have been the commercial centre of Funan at Óc Eo includes Roman as well as Persian, Indian, and Greek artefacts. The German classical scholar Albrecht Dihle believed that Funan's main port, was the Kattigara referred to by the 2nd century Alexandrian geographer Ptolemy as the emporium where merchants from the Chinese and Roman empires met to trade. Dihle also believed that the location of Óc Eo best fit the details given by Ptolemy of a voyage made by a Graeco-Roman merchant named Alexander to Kattigara, situated at the easternmost end of the maritime trade route from the eastern Roman Empire.

Georges Coedès said: "Fu-nan occupied a key position with regard to the maritime trade routes, and was inevitably a port of call both for the navigators who went through the Straits of Malacca and for those – probably more numerous – who made the transit over one of the isthmuses of the Malay Peninsula. Fu-nan may even have been the terminus of voyages from the Eastern Mediterranean, if it is the case that the Kattigara mentioned by Ptolemy was situated on the western coast of Indochina on the Gulf of Siam".

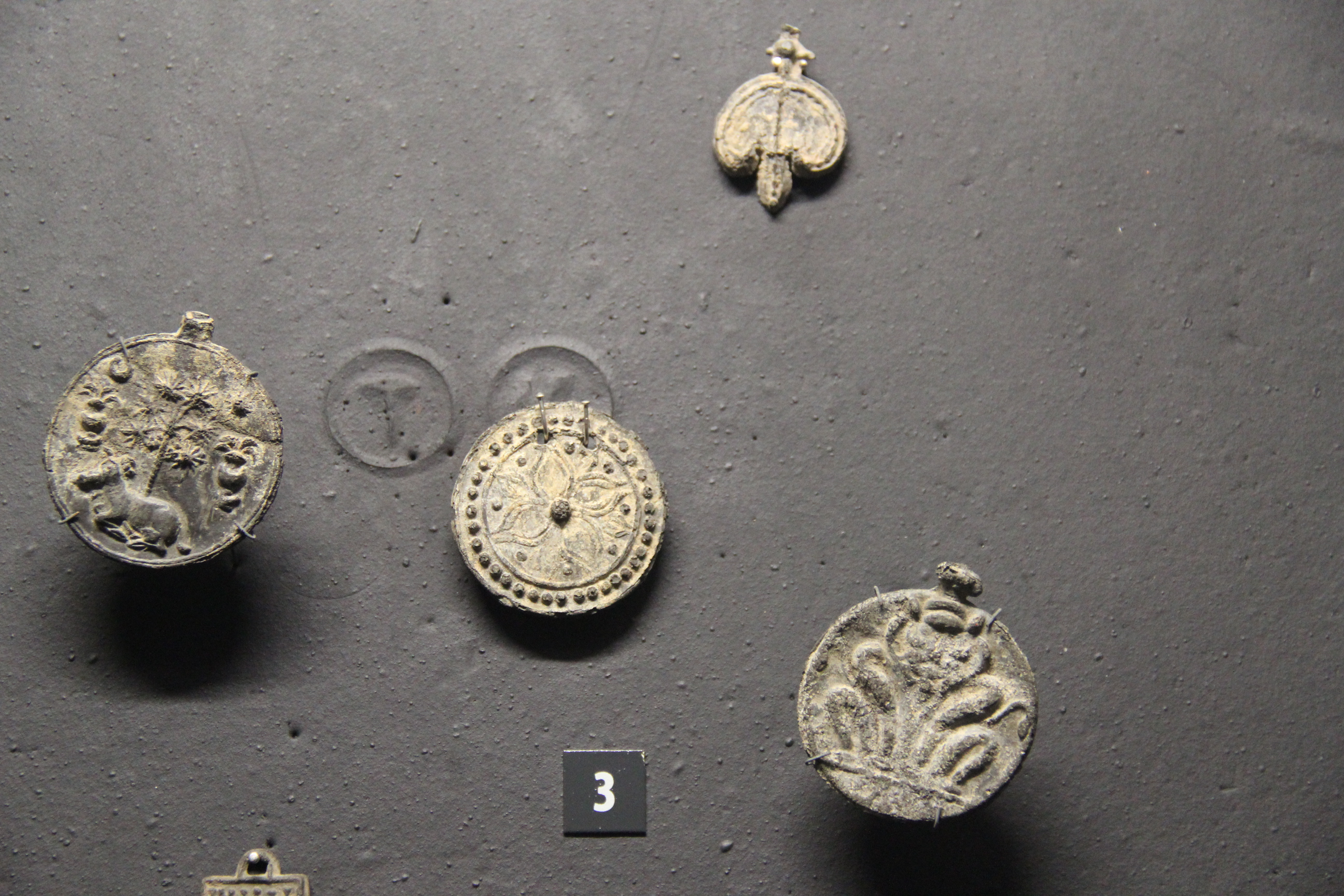
Greco-Indian

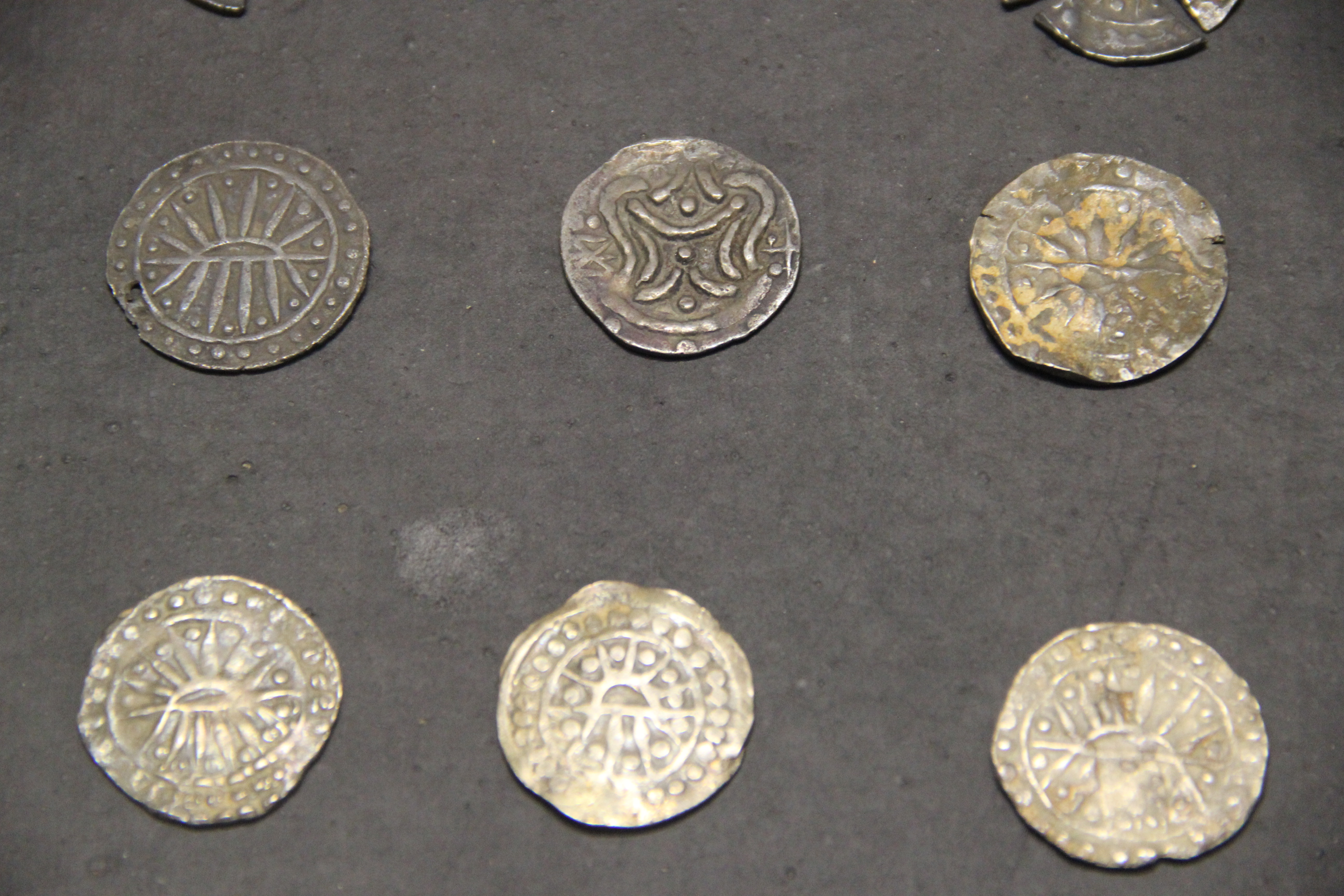
Pyu

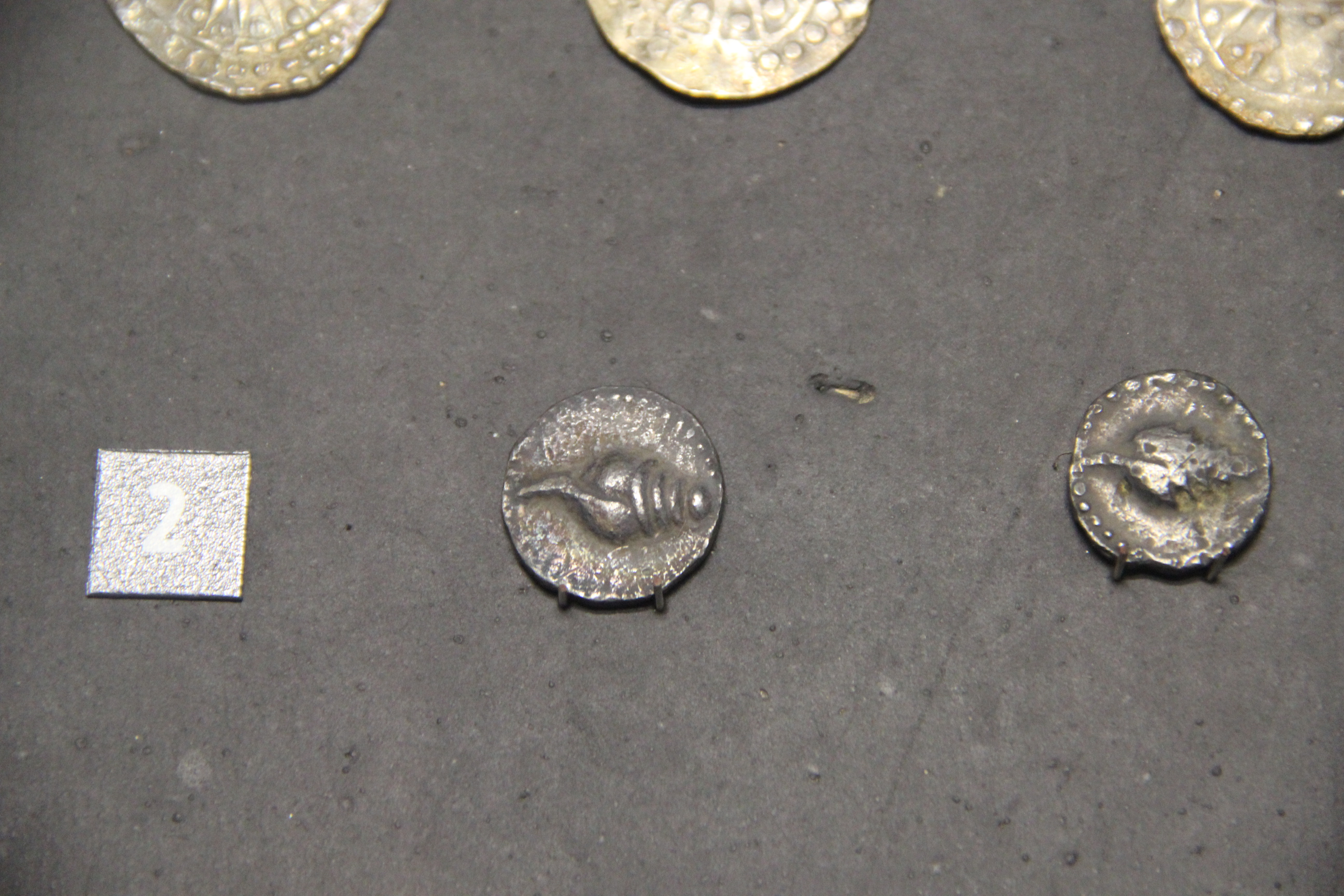
Indian

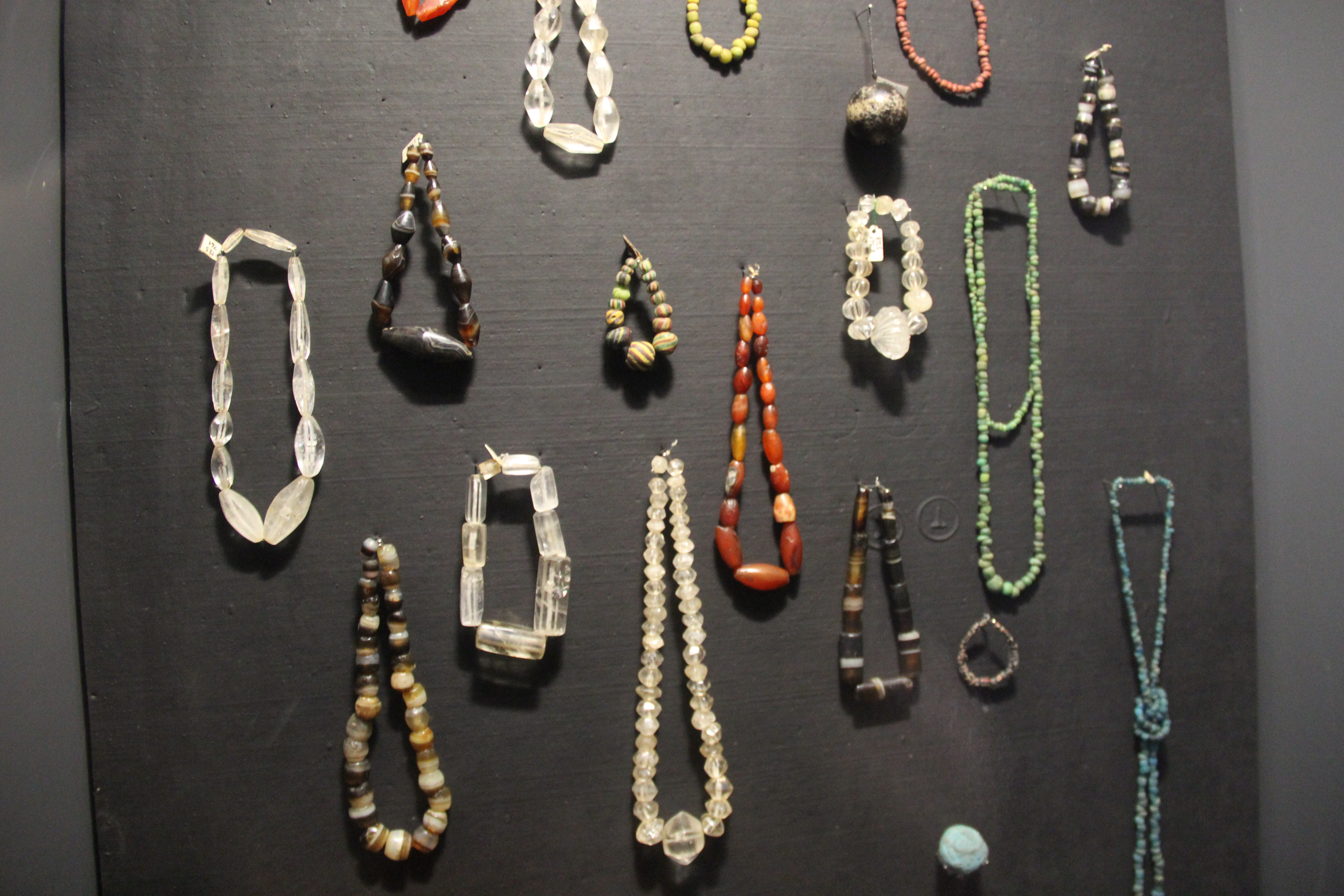
Funanese beads

First three: silver coins of foreign origin traded in Funan.

At Óc Eo, Roman coins were among the items of long-distance trade discovered by the French archaeologist Louis Malleret in the 1940s. These include mid-2nd-century Roman golden medallions from the reigns of Antoninus Pius, and his adopted son and heir Marcus Aurelius. From Óc Eo, archaeologists also found a fine gold pendant imitation of a aureus of Antoninus minted in c. 152 CE with caption ANTONINVS AVG PIVS (Antoninus Aug(ustus) Pius) and portrait of the emperor turning left. Similar gold sheet discs that imitated Roman coins minted by local Funanese also are rediscovered, included imitations of aureus of Antoninus (minted in c. 155–158), Commodus (c. 192), Septimius Severus (c. 198–202), perhaps the minting techniques were brought by traders including those from the Roman Empire. It is perhaps no small coincidence that the first Roman embassy from "Daqin" recorded in Chinese history is dated 166 CE, allegedly sent by a Roman ruler named "Andun" (Chinese: 安敦; corresponding with the names Antoninus Pius or Marcus Aurelius Antoninus) and arriving through the Eastern Han Empire's southernmost frontier province of Jiaozhi in northern Vietnam.

In addition to trade, Funan also benefited from a sophisticated agricultural system that included use of an elaborate system of water storage and irrigation. The Funanese population was concentrated mainly along the rivers of the Mekong Delta; the area was a natural region for the development of an economy based on fishing and rice cultivation.

=== Foreign relations ===
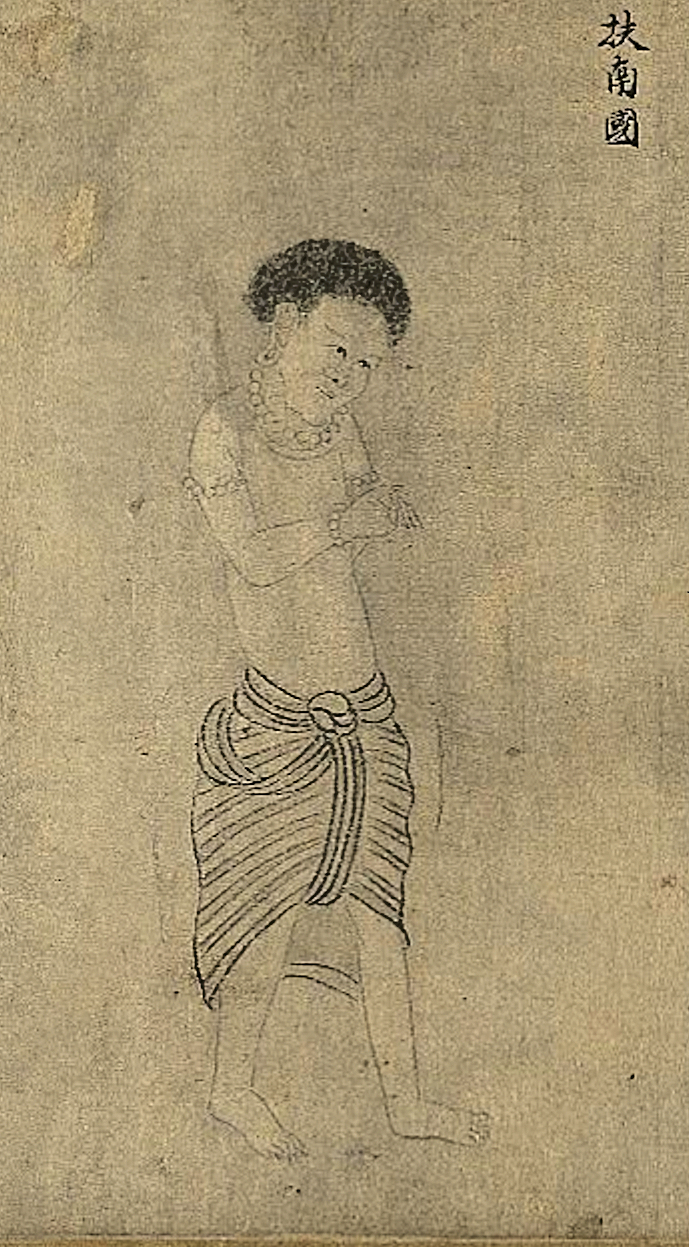
Envoy of Funan (扶南國) to the Liang dynasty. Part of "Entrance of the Foreign Visitors of Emperor Yuan of Liang" (梁元帝番客入朝圖) by the painter Gu Deqian (顧德謙) of the Southern Tang dynasty (937–976 CE).

Little is known about Funan's political history apart from its relations with China. The Funanese had diplomatic relations and traded with the Eastern Wu and Liang dynasties of southern China. Contact with Southeast Asia began after the Southward expansion of the Han dynasty, and the annexation of Nanyue and other kingdoms situated in southern China. Goods imported or modelled on those from China, like bronze axes, have been excavated in Cambodia. An Eastern Wu embassy was sent from China to Funan in 228. A brief conflict is recorded to have happened in the 270s, when Funan and its neighbour, Linyi, joined forces to attack the area of Tongking (Vietnamese: Đông Kinh, "eastern capital"), located in what is now modern Northern Vietnam (which was a Chinese colony at the time).

Funan maintained diplomatic relations with the Murunda dynasty of northern Kalinga during 3rd cen CE, when King Dhamadamadhara (Dharmatamadharasya) of Murunda received envoy Su-Wu who represented King Fan Chan of Funan (225–250 CE).

According to Chinese sources, Funan was eventually conquered and absorbed by its vassal polity Chenla (pinyin: Zhēnlà). Chenla was a Khmer polity, and its inscriptions are in both Sanskrit and in Khmer. The last known ruler of Funan was Rudravarman (留陁跋摩, pinyin: Liútuóbámó) who ruled from 514 up to c. 545 CE.

The French historian Georges Coedès once hypothesized a relation between the rulers of Funan and the Shailendra dynasty of Indonesia. Coedès believed that the title of "mountain lord" used by the Sailendra kings may also have been used by the kings of Funan, since he also believed that the name "Funan" was a Chinese transcription related to the Khmer "phnom", which means "mountain." Other scholars have rejected this hypothesis, pointing to the lack of evidence in early Cambodian epigraphy for the use of any such titles.

People who came from the coast of Funan are also known to establish Chi Tu (the Red Earth Kingdom) in the Malay Peninsula. The Red Earth Kingdom is thought to be a derivation nation of Funan with its own kind of Khmer culture.

== List of rulers of Funan ==
Sanskrit Name	Names in Chinese Texts	Reign	Ref.
Soma	Liǔyè (柳葉)	AD 180–190	
Kaundinya I	Hùntián (混塡) / Hùnhuì (混湏)	AD 190–198	
Unknown	Pán Huàng / Hùnpánkuàng (混盤況)	AD 198–217	
Unknown	Pánpán (盤盤)	AD 217–220	
Śrīmāraña	Fàn Shīmàn (范師蔓)	AD 220–228	
Unknown	Fàn Jīnshēng (范金生)	AD 228–230	
Unknown	Fàn Zhān (范旃)	AD 230–240	
Unknown	Fàn Cháng (范長)	AD 240	
Unknown	Fàn Xún (范尋)	AD 240–248	
Unknown	Unknown	Unknown	
Unknown	Unknown	AD 288–310	
Unknown	Unknown	AD 310–357	
Chandana	Zhāntán (旃檀)	AD 357	
Unknown	Unknown	Unknown	
Kaundinya II	Qiáo Chénrú (僑陳如)	AD 420	
Sri Indravarman	Chílítuóbámó (持梨陀跋摩)	AD 430–440	
Unknown	Unknown	AD 440–470	
Jayavarman Kaundinya	Qiáochénrú Shéyébámó (僑陳如闍耶跋摩)	AD 470–514	
Rudravarman	Liútuó Bámó (留陁跋摩)	A.D. 514–545	

== See also ==
- Kattigara
- Mnong people
- Angkor Borei and Phnom Da
- Óc Eo
- Cát Tiên archaeological site
- Suvarnabhumi
