= Kang Tai =

Chinese traveller

Kang Tai (康泰) was a Chinese traveller in the middle of the third century from the state of Eastern Wu. He is known for his travels to Southeast Asia in which he became one of the first Chinese, along with Zhu Ying (朱應), to document the existence of the kingdom known as Funan in his book, Wushi waiguo zhuan (吳時外國傳, Accounts of foreign states in Wu times). He was reportedly impressed with the accomplishments of Funan as well as with its capital city and reported that the written language of Funan bore similarities to Indian script. He is speculated to have been Sogdian origin according to some studies.

== See also ==
- Chinese exploration
