= Mahidharapura Kingdoms =

Ancient kingdom in central Thailand

- 600s – 1431
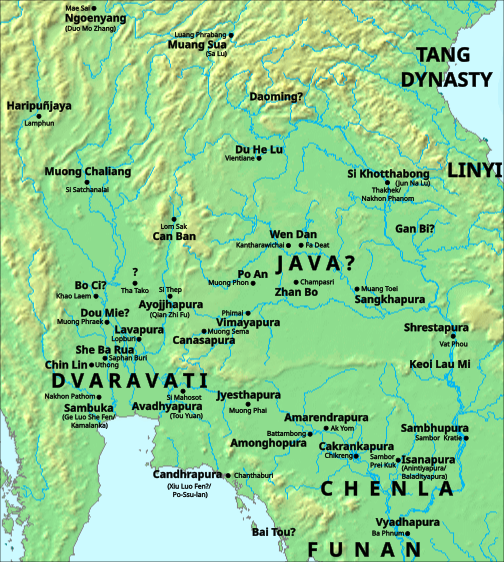
- Proposed locations of ancient polities in the Menam and Mekong Valleys in the 7th century.
- Capital: Mahidharapura; Vimayapura; Kasitindrakama
- Religion: Buddhism; Hinduism
- Government: Mandala Kingdom
  - c. 600s (first): Soryavarman
  - c. 1040: Hiranyavarman
  - 1080–1107: Jayavarman VI
  - 1107–1150?: Suryavarman II
  - Early 13th c.: Hiranya
- Historical era: Post-classical era
  - Early chiefdoms: 500s
  - Establishment: 600s
  - Conquered Angkor: 1080
  - Seat at Angkor: 1113
  - Part of Angkor: 1113–1300s
  - Dependency of Siam: 1431–19th c.
  - Incorporated into Siam: 19th c.
Succeeded by
Angkor; Ayutthaya
- Today part of: Thailand

The Mahidharapura Kingdoms (Thai: มหิธรปุระ) were a group of ancient political entities under the control of the Mahidharapura dynasty from the 600s to the 17th century in the present-day Nakhon Ratchasima and Buriram provinces of Thailand. Its main chief centers were Vimayapura (วิมายาปุระ) in modern Phimai and Kasitindrakama (กษิตีนทรคาม), near the Prasat Phanom Rung and Prasat Muang Tam in Buriram province; however, some speculate Kasitindrakama was probably in the present Sisaket province and Mahidharapura was in modern Mueang Buriram. The Mahidharapura house, led by Jayavarman VI, that subdued Yaśodharapura in the Tonlé Sap Basin in 1080, likely originated from Vimayapura. The most recent archaeological studies suggest its capital, Mahidharapura, was probably modern Sakon Nakhon.

Mahidharapura polities covered the area of the present-day Buriram province and the eastern part of Nakhon Ratchasima. To the south, it met the well-known Angkor and adjoined Dvaravati's Canasapura (later Khorakhapura) to the west. Bordered an unknown kingdom ruled by Sri Jayasimhavarmman to the north in the Kaset Sombun Valley; possibly part of Bhavapura. To the east and northeast, met a group of city-states of Wen Dan, which occasionally equated to Bhavapura, and adjoined Keoi Lau Mì of the Kuy to the southeast.

Previously, several scholars believed the Phimai region had been a vassal to the kings of Angkor since the beginning of the Angkorian period. Nonetheless, the Phanom Rung Inscriptions (K.384), dated 1050 CE, which outline the ancestry of the Mahidharapura dynasty, demonstrate the alliance between Mahidharapura and Yaśodharapura rather than a relationship of vassals and suzerains, at least before the specified period.

Following the decline of Angkor in the late 13th century, the Mahidharapura polities experienced limited population and vanished from the historical records, reappearing in the 15th century when it was made a dependency of the Ayutthaya Kingdom. A monarch with the same regnal title, Mahīđharavarman (III), appears in the 13th-century Chinese text. He was enthroned as the king of a short-lived kingdom of Chen Li Fu in the western Menam Basin in 1204; however, was later overthrown by Phrip Phri's king Mahesvastidrādhirājakṣatriya in 1225. The connection has been put no higher than a name. The Indic royal name borne by the ruler of Chen Li Fu may be that of a prominent ruler from the polities north of the Dangrek range, taken up as a formal style for dealings with the Chinese court and perhaps accompanied by kinship ties.

== History ==
=== Pre-literate era: 500 BCE – 500 CE ===
The Phimai region entered the pre-literate Iron Age around 500 BCE – 500 CE. In the late prehistory (200 BCE – 300 CE), it is estimated that the population density on the upper Mun River alluvial plain may have been as high as 80 individuals per km^{2} with the lowest 14 per km^{2} in the uplands; however, this drastically reduced to less than 50 individuals per km^{2} during the Angkorian period (1000 CE – 1300 CE). The settlements were densely situated along the river plains, and the settlements were larger when compared to the Angkorian-period-founded sites. David J. Welch posits that these domains experienced a population decline throughout the Angkor period, though not necessarily utter abandonment.

The excavations at the Prasat Phanom Wan, located 10 kilometers northeast of the present-day Nakhon Ratchasima city, revealed prehistoric remains, including some Iron Age burials. As well, the Prasat Hin Phimai area, subsequently incorporated into Angkor around 1000 CE, exhibits substantial evidence of prehistoric habitation that persisted for several centuries before Angkor's emergence. Several sculptures from the upper Mun provide some of the earliest evidence for contact between Southeast Asia and India, such as a small bronze standing Buddha image found at Nakhon Ratchasima, which is in the southeastern Indian or Ceylonese Amaravati or Anuradhapura style and dates from 100 to 400 CE.

Settlement details comparison in the Phimai region in the 700 km^{2} survey area
Phase	Period	Number of settlement	Total settlement area (hectare)	EPD (Note: Estimated population density) (no./km^{2})
Prehistory	200 BCE – 600 CE	71	584	42
Dvaravati	600 CE – 1000 CE	65	393	28
Angkor	1000 CE – 1300 CE	76	449	32

=== Dvaravati–Chenla period: 500s – 900s ===
The regions entered the Early Historic period around 300–500 CE. The archaeological evidence confirms the importance of Indian influences transmitted to the plateau from the 7th to 10th centuries. However, the record of the Phimai region during this period is very sparse. Its early chiefdoms were speculated to have been formed around the 500s – 590s, and were ostensibly influenced by Buddhist Dvaravati of the Mon people to the west and the Khmer Hindu-dominant Chenla to the south. The earliest inscriptions are in Sanskrit alone; later indigenous languages, like as Khmer and Mon, occur on certain inscriptions. Only later did Khmer texts become common. The cultural and political differentiation between the Mon and Khmer in northeastern Thailand, especially in the southern part, is likely unjustifiable until at least 1000 CE, when Dvaravati dissolved and Angkor rose. Some artifacts, dated 6th-7th centuries, are pre-Angkorian Cambodian styles, while some are found to resemble Dvaravati-style Buddha figures from central Thailand. Buddhist sculptures discovered at the Prakhon Chai hoard in modern Buriram province reveal the connection to Si Thep on the margins of the Khorat Plateau, which was once strategically located on a route linking the Mekong and Mun rivers with the Chao Phraya Valley. Local textual tradition names Prakhon Chai, in those sources Talung (เมืองตลุง or ตะลุมดอ), as having been under the authority of Padumasuriyavamsa (r. 757–800).

During this period, the region contained several large settlements surrounded by circular or irregular earth walls and moats, which were probably the center of small political units. Most of the population lived in clusters of villages of 1 to 1.5 hectares, some surrounded by moats, most unmoated, with cultivated rice fields lying beyond the moats. The reduction in average settlement size discovered in this period indicates the migration from fortified major villages to vulnerable little hamlets, which was due to the emergence of a singular political authority and the cessation of recurrent conflict in the Phimai region. In the late Dvaravati period, the western side of Mueang Sema has been identified as potentially acting as a second-tier settlement, known as the regional center, in the Dvaravati hinterland. At the same time, the eastern region continued to grow, creating multiple competing centers that waned in Dvaravati influence and then entered the pre-Angkorian period. Summarized data from several surveys found that in the present-day Nakhon Ratchasima and Buriram provinces, which were the regions under the house of Mahidharapura, there are 335 ancient settlements in total, with 97 Angkorian-style stupas, and 12 klints.

Comparison of the village's sizes in the Phimai region before 1300 CE
Phase	Period	Zone			Average (hectare)
Phase	Period	Alluvial plain	Terrace	Uplands	Average (hectare)
Prehistory	200 BCE – 600 CE	9.2	5.1	8.1	8.2
Dvaravati	600 CE – 1000 CE	6.4	5.0	5.5	6.0
Angkor	1000 CE – 1300 CE	6.6	4.0	5.5	5.9
Note: unit in hectare

==== Dvaravati sphere: 500s – 900s ====
Several Sanskrit, Mon, and Khmer Inscriptions dating to the 6th century support the existence of early chiefdoms that developed along the Dângrêk Mountains, although it has been held that, with at least one exception, the rulers who raised those inscriptions may never have actually ruled there. The Sanskrit Phimai Inscription No. 1 (K.1000), found at the Prasat Phimai and dated to the 7th–8th century, names a Buddhist king called Sauryavarman. The two mixed Mon–Khmer with Sanskrit script Hĭn K‘ôn Inscriptions (K.388 and K.389), dated the 7th–8th centuries, were discovered near an ancient Mueang Sema in Nakhon Ratchasima. Both are dedications by a Buddhist monk identified as King Nrpendradhiphativarman, who set up four sema stones and endowed a temple and a monastery. They name further kings and polities otherwise unknown, among them one Soryavarman, perhaps related to Sauryavarman, whose name has been found suspiciously Angkorian. The two texts, often described as pre-Angkorian, have also been read as belonging instead to a somewhat later period and to an isolated local dialect. A further Sanskrit inscription of about 550–650 CE on the base of a large stone Buddha from Wat Chanthuek in Pak Chong (N.M. 4; K.1009) records its dedication by a queen described as a daughter of the Lord of Dvaravati. The wording has been read as evidence that the site lay outside Dvaravati and that the two houses were joined by marriage, and the unusually large stone images from Wat Chanthuek and Sung Noen mark a centre of power and wealth in the area of old Khorat in its own right. That authority covered the Phimai, Prakhon Chai and Muang Sema region from the reign of Padumasuriyavamsa (r. 757–800) The area, particularly the Phimai–Prakhon Chai zone, appears to have asserted political autonomy. This development is marked by the emergence of a new monarch, Mahidharavarman I, around 920. His royal house, later known as the Mahidharapura dynasty, came to rule the region and appears to have maintained closer political and cultural ties with Angkor to the south. Within this sphere, Prasat Phimai likely functioned as one of the most significant religious centers. The dynasty retained control over the region for several generations before extending its political authority southward into the Tonlé Sap Basin and eventually conquered Angkor in the 11th century.

The Chinese Book of Sui, dated 598–618, and the largest Chinese leishu, Cefu Yuangui, mention the kingdom of Zhū Jiāng, whose royals established relations via royal intermarriage with Chenla to the southeast. Its identification remains uncertain. One reading places it in the upper Mun valley, another among the Dvaravati principalities of the Menam Basin. Some say it is the corrupted name of Zhū Bō (朱波) in the New Book of Tang, which has been identified with the Pyu Kingdoms in Myanmar, or even placed it on the Mekong plains. Another polity, Bhavapura, which occasionally identified with Wen Dan, might be on the Korat plateau as well.

The most persuasive evidence for a significant early kingdom in the region is an 8th-century Buddhist settlement known as Sri Canasa or Sri Canasapura in the Bo Ika Inscription (K.400), discovered in the 10th-century temple ruin, which refers to Sri Canasa as a deserted domain outside Kambudesa, indicating that this community was once left abandoned before the 8th century. The line of five Canasapura's kings, beginning in 937, was later found in the relocated Sri Canasa Inscription (K.494), which was recovered at Ayutthaya; Old Khorat lay on the routes later taken by Ayutthayan armies marching to the plateau, so the stone may have been carried south at some later date. Cānāśa is known from these two inscriptions alone and from no literary source. The earliest one was Bhagadatta, whose name ends with a "datta" suffix, which is a non-Indic title for the indigenous leader, similar to "pon" of the 7th–8th century Chenla polities and the Funanese "fan". The proto-"pon" familial system of Chenla might have originated in the upper Mun region, based on evidence from the extensive Iron Age grave site at Noen U-Loke (เนินอุโลก) near Phimai, dated 200 BCE to 300 CE. On one account the pon was a male title inherited matrilineally, passing to the sister's son. Pon were probably the leaders of large villages, holding communal land near a pond, or travan, with a clan house as the ritual centre. During Canasapura's declining period in the late 10th century, its Hindu neighbor named Khorakhapura was formed 6 kilometers to the southeast, shortened called Nakhon Raj, but little known about this polity. Several scholars speculate it was Mueang Rad (เมืองราด), mentioned in the Sukhothai Inscription, and was said to be ruled by King Pha Mueang, son of Srinaonamthum who ruled the Sukhothai Kingdom from 1157 to 1182. An Inscription with 33 lines of text, engraved on 3 sides, was discovered in the temple ruins but has since been lost before being deciphered. The city was later relocated 25 kilometers to the east in the 14th century and evolved into the present-day Nakhon Ratchasima City.

The northern limit of Mahidharapura's influence might be the area around the upper Chi River basin, which is the present boundary of Chaiyaphum and Nakhon Ratchasima provinces as there was another polity ruled by King Jaya Singhavarman in the Kaset Sombun–Nong Bua Daeng valley in northern Chaiyaphum, according to the Monic K.404 Stèle de Phu Khiao Kao dating to the 7th–8th century. Some say he may have been the king of Bhavapura. To the east, there was another Dvaravati-influenced polity named Keoi Lau Mì, mentioned in the Chinese text Tang Huiyao, which is said to be the kingdom of the Kuy people in the area around the Dângrêk Mountains by a Thai scholar Thongtham Nathchamnong (ทองแถม นาถจำนง). Further east, a small polity named Sankhapura centered at the ruin of Dong Mueang Toey in modern Yasothon province was mentioned in the K.577 and K.1082 Inscriptions, also dated 7th–8th centuries. To the northeast, it met a group of polities in the lower Chi Basin, with key sites at Mueang Fa Daet Song Yang, Champasri, Roi Et, and others, which were more dominated by the Old Mon Inscriptions. The plateau material has been assigned to a second phase of Old Mon epigraphy in Thailand, of about the 8th to 10th centuries and written in a post-Pallava script. Most of it is carved on sema stones and is short, recording meritorious acts and donors' names, and it has been recorded in Chaiyaphum, Khon Kaen, Udon Thani, Sakon Nakhon and, more recently, Phetchabun, with one of a group in Kalasin province bearing a date corresponding to 771 CE. That spread is not by itself evidence for the extent of Dvaravati, since a site yielding one need not have been affiliated with it. Meanwhile, the easternmost 7th–century polities in modern Ubon Ratchathani province seem to have some connection with the settlements along the Mekong River in Champasak, Thala Borivat, and Sambor Prei Kuk areas.

==== Chenla invasions: 590s – 630s ====
To the south on the lower Mekhong Basin, the brothers Bhavavarman I and Mahendravarman founded the new capital of Chenla in 580 CE near Sambor Prei Kuk and then expanded political influence northward beyond the Dângrêk Mountains to the modern lower northeastern Thailand around the early 7th century by conquering several polities in the region, as mentioned in several Citrasena–Mahendravarman Inscriptions, which the northernmost one was discovered at the ancient Dong Mueang Aem in modern Khon Kaen province. Prior interpretations proposed that Chenla administered this subjugated territory as a form of vassalage. However, this political or military influence stood for a short period, as Chenla faced a power struggle and finally fell into pieces in the late 7th century, during the reign of Jayadevi (r. 681–713), and those inscriptions only represents a mere exclamation of triumph, without suggesting a lasting dominion over the territory. It has been argued that none of the inscriptions demonstrate direct authority or control beyond the Dong Rek Mountain; these expeditions or exploratory ventures appear to have had little lasting political impact, as regional inscriptions for several subsequent centuries make no reference to rulers from the Tonlé Sap Basin following the period associated with Mahendravarman. It is estimated that Chenla probably began to penetrate the Phimai region around the late 6th century during the reign of Bhavavarman I, and significantly expanded northwest during the reign of Isanavarman I.

There was a polity known as Bhīmapura that was subjugated by Isanavarman I (r. 616–637) during his northwestward territorial expansion. Its identification, however, remains uncertain. Bhīmapura has been tentatively placed beyond Amoghapura, another Chenla vassal in what is now Battambang Province, and identified more specifically with Vimayapura in the Phimai region of the upper Chi–Mun Valley. In the first half of the 8th century, this region, together with Si Thep, was likely incorporated into Wen Dan, and subsequently came under the authority of Padumasuriyavamsa (r. 757–800) of Indaprasthanagara, followed by the lineage of Bhagadatta of Chanasa. By the 920s, a new ruler, Mahidharavarman I, had emerged in the Phimai region.

The polities in the Mun-Chi Basin, those known as Wen Dan, have been proposed to have broken away from the united Chenla in 707, while an earlier date has been given, the end of Jayavarman I's reign, that is 681.

=== Angkorian period: 900s – 1300s ===
During this period, the region experienced a population decline, but not complete abandonment. In contrast, the city of Vimayapura was twice its original size. Some large settlements were abandoned, but numerous small hamlets were established. This shift suggests the formation of a single site hierarchy at Vimayapura and of an integrated political and economic system in the region. The settlement pattern during this period was shifted to rectangular walls and moated sites, rectangular reservoir or baray, and rectangular temple enclosures, enclosing laterite, brick, and stone structures, and was smaller when compare to the late prehistoric settlements. The number of sites in the southern Phimai region on the uplands, which links Vimayapura and Angkor, significantly increased; however, the population remains more dense in the alluvial plain.

==== Early era: Mid-10th century – 1080 ====
After Jayavarman II declared independent from Java and established Kambujadesa in 802, he moved the capital northward to Hariharalaya and later to the Angkor region, and may then have formed alliances with communities in the Mun-Chi river basin, including Wen Dan (potentially Bhavapura) and the Phimai region, to counter Si Thep in the Pa Sak River basin to the west. A reading that dates Jayavarman II's accession to 802 offers this as an alternative to another, in which Jayavarman II defeated Wen Dan outright. Following the internal political conflict in Angkor that concluded in the mid-10th century, Angkorian influence over the Phimai region appears to have intensified, as a new royal house under Mahidharavarman I assumed control of the region from Padumasuriyavamsa's successors in 920. However, the people in this region potentially shifted to speak Khmer earlier, around the late 9th century, but was yet to be integrated into the Angkor. The information provided in the Phanom Rung Inscription (K.384), dated 1050 CE, clearly states that Mahidharapura clan had ruled the territory autonomously and was in alliance with the kings of Angkor rather than as vassals, even though there were several religious and political exercises of the pre-1000s Angkorian kings in the Mahidharapura area.

Mahidharavarman I, who was believed to be the father of the Mahidharapura's king, Hiranyavarman (r. c. 1040), served as a high official at the court of the two Angkorian brothers, Harshavarman I (r. 910–923) and Ishanavarman II (r. 923–928), whose reigns were marked by power struggles with their maternal uncle, Jayavarman IV, who set up his capital about 100 km away at Koh Ker in 921, causing Ishanavarman II's reign to be confined to Angkor and the area around Battambang to the west. Mahidharavarman also built the Prasat Kravan to the east of Angkor in 921 CE. According to the Prasat Khna Inscription (K.1312), dating to 891 CE, the line of Mahidharapura began with a princess who was a descendant of the Śreshthapura House and became a consort of the Angkorian king Jayavarman V (r. 968–1001) from the Bhavapura House. Her elder brother received the title of Rajapativarman, which identifies him as the governor of Khorakhapura, while the other brother received the title of Narapativiravarman, which indicates that he was the ruler of Lavo. Moreover, Jayavirahvarman, who ruled Angkor from 1002 to 1006 and was overthrown by Suryavarman I, potentially was from the Mahidharapura area. The Wat Cong Ko inscription (K.1249) from Nakhon Ratchasima province, dated 1008, records a donation by him to the god Vimāya at Phimai two years after the loss of Angkor, and this has been taken to indicate that he retained authority on the plateau and was probably its ruler, perhaps of the Mahidharapura line. The Phanom Rung Inscriptions No. 1–9, engraved in Sanskrit language with Old Khmer script, dated to the mid-12th century, provide the political structure in the region that was ruled by the Sūryavaṃśa (Solar dynasty) and centered at Kasitindrakama (กษิตีนทรคาม), which identified as the area around Phanom Rung, with Vimayapura (Phimai) as the grand prince city (เมืองลูกหลวง).

To the west, Canasapura, which was potentially governed by the Candravaṃśa Bhavapura dynasty, disappeared from the historical record. It possibly allied with Yaśodharapura during the reign of Rajendravarman II (r. 944–968), from the same dynasty. The old settlement at Muang Sema was abandoned after the 970s, and the people relocated to the newly founded Hindu polity named Khorakhapura, 6 kilometers to the southeast. The noble named Driḍhabhakti Simhavarman (ทฤฒภักดี สิงหวรมัน, Thritthaphakdi Singha Woraman), appearing in the K.1141 Muang Sema Inscription, dated 970 CE, was probably King Narapatisimhavarman (นรปติสิงหวรมัน, Naruepati Singha Woraman) in the K.949 Śri Canāśa Inscription, whose role was reduced after pledging allegiance to Rajendravarman II. To the northeast, Wen Dan disappeared, giving way to the emergence of the polities known as the Kuruntha kingdoms, which have been associated with Lao-related populations. These formations are regarded as characteristic of the so-called “Java period” of the Chi River Basin and other Lao mueang, spanning from the 9th century until the establishment of the Lan Xang Kingdom in the 14th century.

At Yaśodharapura to the south, since the reign of Candravaṃśa's Jayavarman V (r. 968–1001) of the Bhavapura house, the aristocratic families dominated the royal court. The throne then fell into his maternal nephew, Udayadityavarman I (r. 1001–1002), whose brother, Jayavirahvarman (r. 1002–1006), was believed to be the prince of Tambralinga. During his reign, the Tonlé Sap basin was divided into two fractions. The western region and the upper Korat Plateau were controlled by Tambralingan Udayadityavarman I at Yaśodharapura, whereas the eastern region with the strongholds in Sambor and Kratié was under Suryavarman I (r. 1006–1050), who was supported by the house of the previous king, Bhavapura. Suryavarman I later span influence westward to Kampong Thom and finally took over Yaśodharapura. Having failed to take the throne, Udayadityavarman I's would-be successor Jayavirahvarman withdrew to Battambang and then to his power bases, Vimayapura. Suryavarman I then launched an attacking campaign of the Khorat Plateau and Chao Phraya basin, several polities were destroyed, which included Vimayapura and Tambralinga's vassal, Lavapura. After the wars, Vimayapura was merged into Angkor, the elite Khmer culture then permeated the Phimai region, especially at the central level and other major settlements. The campaign is documented by the Khmer inscription K.1198, dated 1014, which records that in 1011 the Vau and Tampāṅ families rebelled against Suryavarman I, that the king confiscated the property of the Vau, including Sukhāvāsa near Phanom Wan, and granted it to his general Lakṣmīpativarman, and that a Buddha image there was to be replaced with a Śivaliṅga. The text has been read as recording a single march from Angkor by way of Pṛthuparvata (Phanom Rung) and Phanom Wan to Lavapura, and note that a later inscription from Phanom Wan, K.393 of 1055, shows Sukhāvāsa to have been a lake. Suryavarman I's invasion of Tambralinga's Lavo and overthrown two Tambralinga princes, Udayadityavarman I and Jayavirahvarman, triggered the conflict between these two kingdoms and led to the 1025–1026 Tambralinga/Srivijiya–Ankorian/Chola Wars.

==== Rise of Mahidharapura: 1080 – 1200s ====
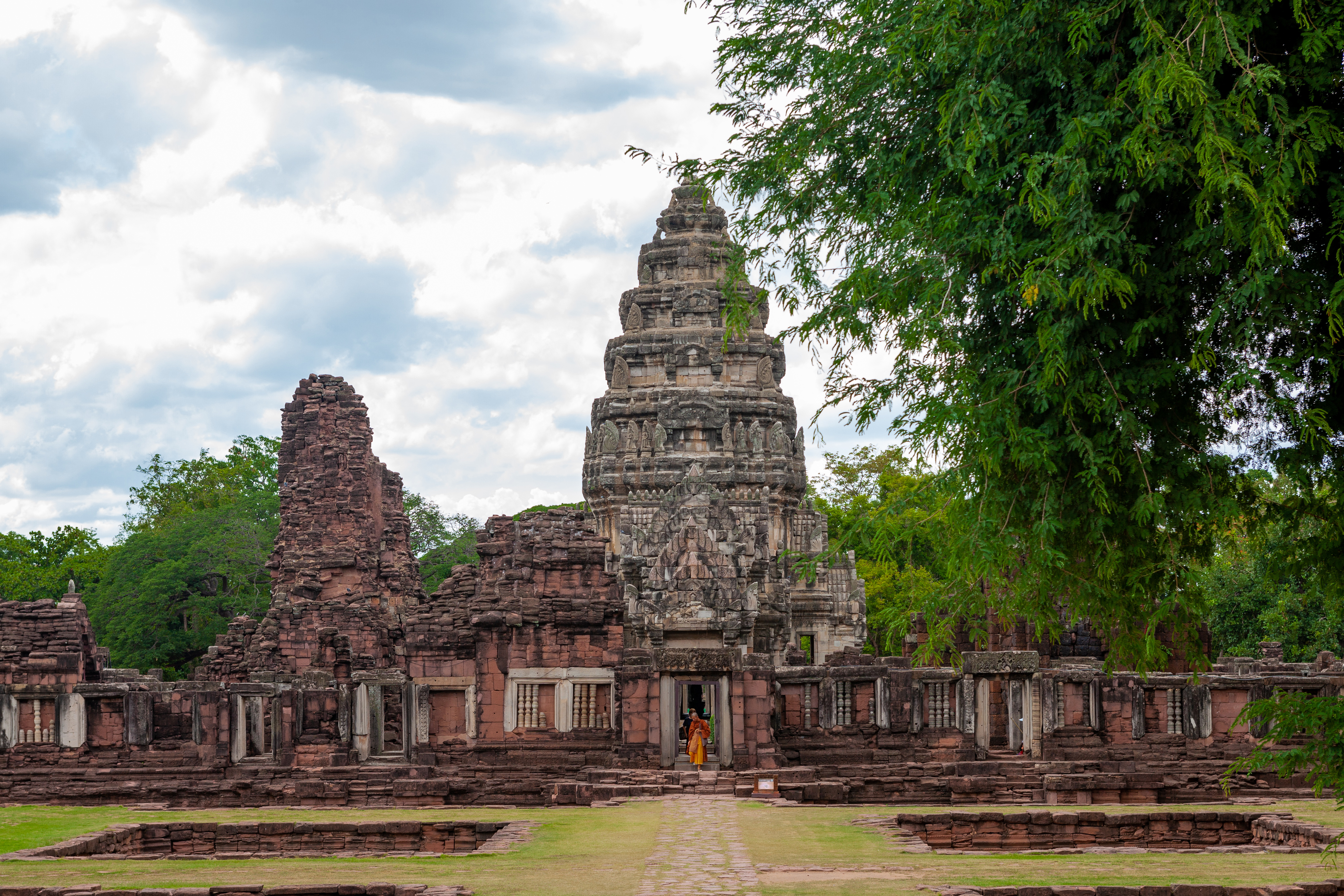
Prasat Phimai, the most well-known ancient temple in the Phimai region, completed around the 11th–12th century.

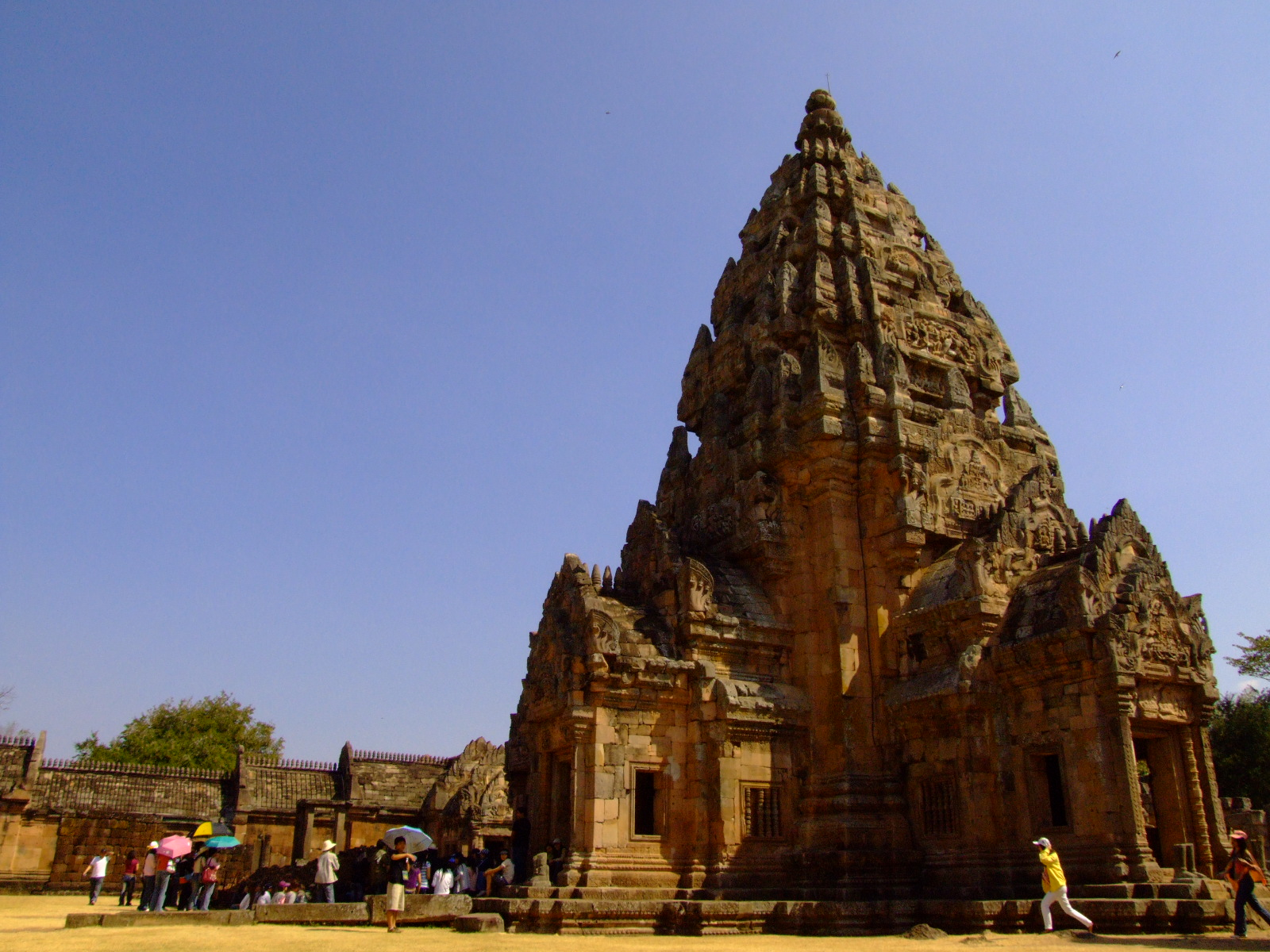
Prasat Phanom Rung, completed in the 13th century by Mahidharapura's king, Narendraditya.

After expelling Jayavirahvarman of the Sūryavaṃśa Mahidharapura clan in 1006, Suryavarman I of the Candravaṃśa Shailendra was enthroned as the new king. His two sons, Udayadityavarman II (r. 1050–1066) and Harshavarman III (r. 1066–1080), succeed him. During the reigns of the two brothers, several attempted rebellions occurred, and also faced the invasion of Champa. Harshavarman III could not hold out and lost the throne to a usurper, Jayavarman VI (r. 1080–1107), a prince of Sūryavaṃśa Mahidharapura from Vimayapura. Jayavarman VI dedicated his reign, characterized by diminishing central authority, to quelling all remnants who remained loyal to the legitimate line of the previous king. After his reign, the line split into the Vimayapura seat, which was ruled by his elder brother, Dharanindravarman I (r. 1107–1113), and the Yaśodharapura seat of his heir, Nripatindravarman (r. 1088–1113). However, a competing reading makes Nripatindravarman instead an elder brother of Vijayendralakshmi, queen consort of the brothers Jayavarman VI and Dharanindravarman I. The same reading asserts that Jayavarman VI never reigned at Yaśodharapura, and Nripatindravarman was probably a son of Udayadityavarman II and engaged in Jayavarman VI campaign against Harshavarman III. During the reign of the brothers, Jayavarman VI and Dharanindravarman I, the seat was actually at Vimayapura.

In 1113, Hiranyavarman's great-grandson, Suryavarman II (r. 1113–1150), overthrew Nripatindravarman at Yaśodharapura to the south. He then assassinated his great-uncle Dharanindravarman I in the battle, and brought Vimayapura under Yaśodharapura rule by moving the seat to the southern conquered city. However, it appears that he spent a significant amount of time in the Mun region. During his reign, Dvaravati's Lavo, which had closed dynastic relations with the upper Mun's polities, was directly governed from Yaśodharapura. After his reign came a period of weak rule and feuding, and several dependencies ceased to answer to Yaśodharapura. His cousin, Dharanindravarman II (r. 1150–1160), succeeded him, and probably married Sri Jayarajacudamani, daughter of Harshavarman III of the previous dynasty. Nonetheless, Sūryavaṃśa Hiranyavarman never claimed that his dynasty had any link to the King Suryavarman I’s Candravaṃśa nor any other lines of Angkorian kings.

The house of Mahidharapura, which originated from the Korat plateau, ruled Angkor for about half of the 500 years of the Angkorian era. A northern Cambodian origin has been given for the line instead, with the first half of the 12th century described as a period in which it was prominent for several decades, so that two dynasties overlapped in competition for control of Angkor. Suryavarman II held the line of Suryavarman I, which has since been derived from the east, in the Mekong delta. The line has also been described as a local family that adopted the Sanskrit name Mahidharapura and built at Phimai a temple of precisely symmetrical plan whose main tower carries a curved lotus form found nowhere else. On their account Angkor Wat was afterwards built with the same precision and the same lotus towers as Phimai, on a far greater scale. During this period, the Mahidharapura center on the plateau was gradually shifted from Kasitindrakama to Vimayapura. For the three centuries that followed the region's integration into the Khmer state about 1000, Phimai served as a major regional administrative center. Another significant regional center was the Prasat Phanom Wan area. The last king of the dynasty, Jayavarman IX, was overthrown in 1336 by a usurper, Trasak Paem of the Trasak Paem house. Angkor then began to decline. Under the rule of Mahidharapura dynasty, several temples were constructed, notably the Dharmacalas or "rest houses" along the route that connected Yaśodharapura to Kasitindrakama and Vimayapura. The Preah Khan inscription of 1191 counts seventeen such lodgings with hearths on the road from the capital to Vimāya, against fifty-seven on the roads to Campā and 121 in all, and it names no road running west. Some stone temples from the 12th century were discovered to be erected on the locations of prior brick temples, including Prasat Phanom Rung, which was built over a site formerly occupied by a series of 7th–8th-centuries brick temples, and the 11th-century-built Prasat Phanom Wan, where some brick structures of the 7th–9th centuries were discovered.

==== Decline of Angkor: after 1200s ====
For the reign of Jayavarman VII the plateau is the one part of the wider region where Angkorian administration is attested epigraphically. Seven Sanskrit inscriptions of śaka 1108, that is 1186, record his hospital foundations, K.368, K.375, K.386, K.387, K.395, K.402 and K.952. Five of them come from the Nakhon Ratchasima region, and the group also takes in sites in Chaiyaphum and Surin, at Sai Fong on the Mekong and near Ubon. Pracinburi and the Khorat Plateau have been read as having remained firmly within the Angkorian sphere, in contrast with Grahi and Lopburi, whose inscriptions of the same years show no indication of Angkorian political or administrative power, though that absence is not taken as conclusive. Traces of Angkor influence on Vimayapura began to disappear after the reign of Jayavarman VII (r. 1181–1218). Several dependencies ceased to answer to it. After the house of Mahidharapura, which originated from Vimayapura and ruled Angkor for more than 250 years, was overthrown, the weak rule period began during the reign of the Trasak Paem house. Angkor's power waned and entered the Dark Age around the 15th century. During this period, reliable sources about both the Phimai region and Cambodia are very rare. Phimai, as well as other polities in the Khorat Plateau, were very sparsely populated.

To the west, after losing Angkor to Sūryavaṃśa Mahidharapura in 1006, there was no record regarding the Candravaṃśa Bhavapura, neither in the Tonlé Sap Basin nor at the Khorakhapura or Nakhon Raj (lit. 'city of kings') in the westernmost Mun Basin. Several Thai scholars identified Mueang Rad (เมืองราด) of King Pha Mueang, mentioned in the Wat Si Chum Inscription, with Khorakhapura. The city played a major role in the formation of the Sukhothai Kingdom as the father of Pha Mueang, named Srinaonamthum, enthroned as the King of Sukhothai-Si Satchanalai from 1157 to 1182, succeeding a Tai–Mon monarch, whose chief center has been shifted to Lavapura of Lavo since 1106, and the former center Si Satchanalai was considered their northern fortress. After losing Sukhothai-Si Satchanalai, Lavo nobles successfully overthrew Srinaonamthum in 1182, which caused Pha Mueang to join forces with the King of Mueang Bang Yang named Si Inthrathit and take Sukhothai from its holder in 1238. King Pha Mueang and Srinaonamthum were reportedly linked to the Lavo monarchs, likely during the era preceding the ascendancy of the Tai-Mon dynasty of Chaliang over Lavo. Some believed Pha Mueang was later enthroned as the Angkorian king Indravarman III (r. 1295–1308), but this presumption is debated.

After the Tai-Mon dynasty of Chaliang at Lavo lost the northern cities of Sukhothai-Si Satchanalai to Pha Mueang in 1238, and Indravarman III (r. 1295–1308) – who was speculated to be Pha Mueang – overthrew his father-in-law Jayavarman VIII and assassinated the would-be successor, then enthroned himself as the new Angkorian king in 1295, the Xiān monarchs at Ayodhya, who had a closed relationship with the Tai-Mon dynasty at Lavo, began to invade Angkor. The Customs of Cambodia, written by a Chinese Zhou Daguan during his diplomatic mission in Angkor from 1296 to 1297, says Angkor faced repeated attacks by Xiān and the country was utterly devastated. The weakened Angkor was later taken over by a usurper, Trasak Paem, in 1336. However, the raid campaign by Xiān was continuously resumed throughout the reign of this new dynasty, and drove them, that severely affected by frequent attacks, to forsake Angkor by relocating the capital to the south of the Tonlé Sap in 1431. The relations between the Mahidharapura house till the reign of the overthrown Jayavarman VIII and the dynasties in the Menam Valleys to the west have not been examined. It is reported that former Kasitindrakama monarch, Suryavarman II, who annexed Angkor, also directly governed Lavo from 1115 throughout his reign in Angkor. Later, another Mahidharapura king, Jayavarman VII of Angkor (r. 1181–1218), entrusted his son Nripatindharavarman to oversee Lavo in the late 1180s. His religious acts in the Menam Valley are also cited in the Prasat Preah Khan Inscription. The 1684 Instructions Given to the Siamese Envoys Sent to Portugal, Voyage de Siam of Guy Tachard, and the Du Royaume de Siam of Simon de la Loubère, trace back the Siamese Lavo dynasty of the first Ayutthaya King Uthong to an ambiguous polity named Yassouttora Nacoora Louang or Tasoo Nacora Louang, which several scholars propose to be either Yaśodharapura or Lavo.

=== Ayutthaya period:1300s–1700s ===
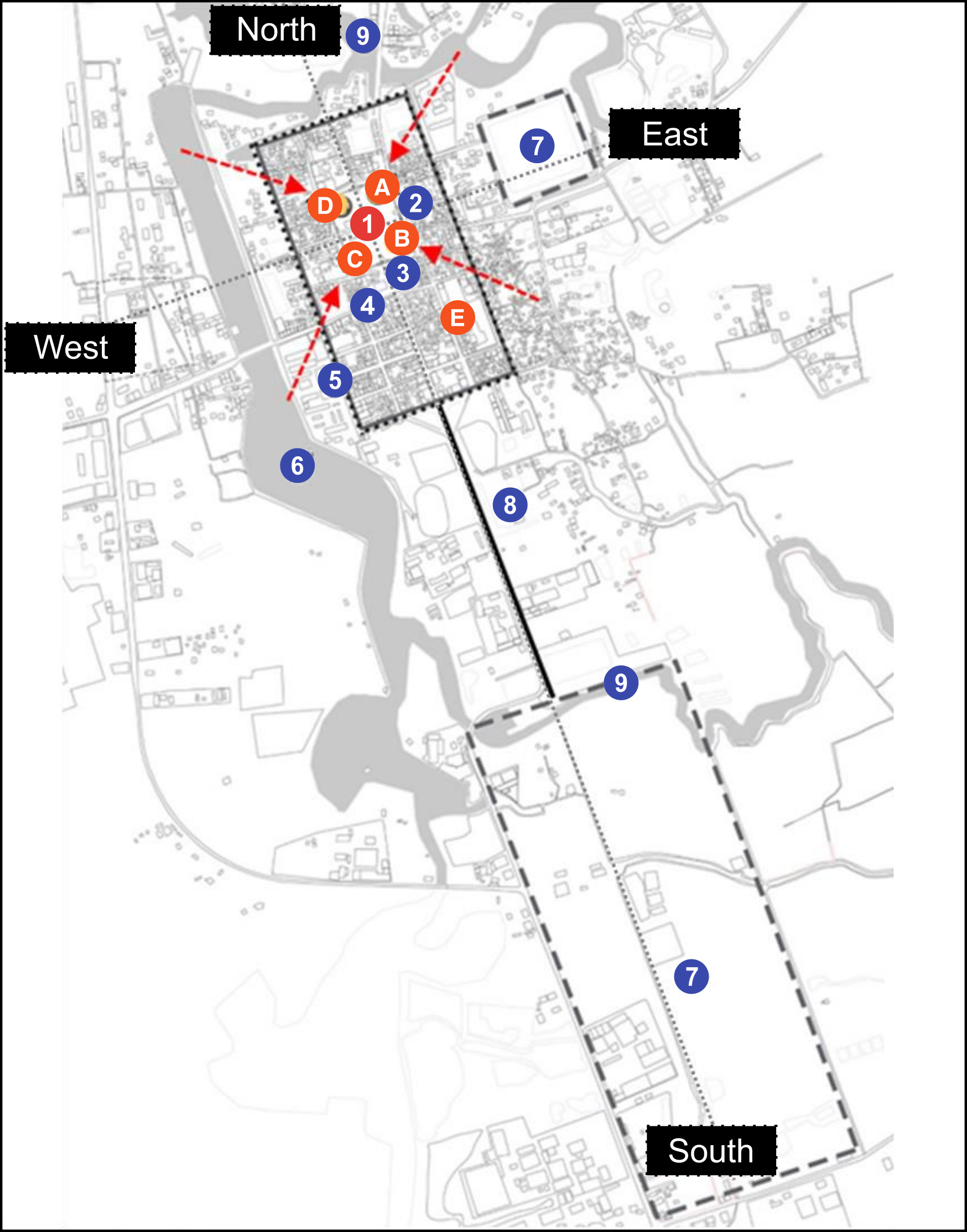
Phimai's layout during the late-Ayutthaya period. – Main stupa (Prasat Phimai) – Wat Sa Hin, Wat Sorn Sila – Wat Prang Yai, Wat Prasad – Wat Prang Noi, Wat Chan – Wat Bot, Wat Prang – Meru Brahmathat – Inner city wall – Southern Gopura – Dharamshala – Outer moats and walls – Chakkarat River – Barays – Arogayasala – creeks

Before the traditional formation of the Ayutthaya Kingdom in 1351, Siamese political influence had not yet reached the Phimai region, which is thought to have maintained a relationship with Angkor, despite a significant reduction in its population and a considerable drop in its power. Thai chronicle tradition has the Phimai region conquered by Ayutthaya in the reign of Ramathibodi I (r. 1351–1369). However, the Khun Srichaimonkhonthep Inscription, which provides the account of Ayutthaya's military campaign toward the Phimai region during the reign of Borommarachathirat II (r. 1424–1448), suggests that the Phimai region potentially became under Ayutthaya around 1431. The Siamese forces then marched south to plunder Angkor Thom, which caused the Angkorian king Barom Reachea II to abandon Angkor and relocate their capital further south-east. The inscription also provides a series of polities in the region, including Phimai, Phanom Rung, Srawkhchay (สราวขชาย), Phnom Khram Smechrod (พนมครามเสม็จร[อ]ด), Phnom Mas (พนมมาส), Singhaphichai (สิงคพิไชย), and Praikhdar (ไพรขดาร).

Phimai and the other cities of the region kept their political and family relations with Angkor. In light of its strategic and economic significance, the Ayutthaya court diminished Phimai's prominence to undermine Angkor's influence by establishing a new fortified city, Nakhon Ratchasima, 50 kilometers west of Phimai. This city functioned as Ayutthaya's stronghold for its power expansion efforts into the northeastern region, Lan Xang, and Cambodia. According to a trace of an ancient city moated and walls discovered in 2025, Nakhon Ratchasima has probably existed before the traditional establishment by Ayutthaya; several scholars propose that the city-state named Mueang Rad (เมืองราด) of King Pha Mueang, mentioned in the Wat Si Chum Inscription, was Khorakhapura, whose population later relocated to Nakhon Ratchasima, but this presupposition has recently been disputed, as some say Mueang Rad is a modern Lom Kao in Phetchabun province. However, as cited in the Wat Si Chum Inscription, Pha Mueang rules Mueang Rad and Mueang Lum (เมืองลุม; identified with Lom Kao); thus, both contested theories might be correct.

Following the First Fall of Ayutthaya in 1569, Phimai became independent for a short period under the Siamese prince Kromma Muen Thepphiphit of the Ban Phlu Luang dynasty. The new Siamese king Taksin of Thonburi Kingdom marched to subjugate Thepphiphit's Phimai regime the following year. During the reign of Ayutthayan Narai (r. 1656–1688), Phimai, together with the three other satellite cities, including Chan Thuek, Chaiyaphum, and Buriram, were governed from Nakhon Ratchasima.

=== Modern era: 1700s–present ===
Phimai has been absent from historical documentation since the late Ayutthaya period, reappearing under the reign of Chulalongkorn (r. 1868–1910) of the Rattanakosin Kingdom, when all local principalities were fully integrated into Siam following the abolition of agnatic succession in the regional dynasties.

== Rulers ==
=== Three city-states era: 7th century – 1080 ===
During Dvaravati period, the Phimai region was probably divided into three courts, the house of Vimayapura at Phimai, the house of Mahidharapura at Kasitindrakama, and the house of Bhavapura–Canasapura at Muang Sema. The latter house, Bhavapura–Canasapura, has some relations with Angkorian king Jayavarman V (r. 968–1001), who was also of the Bhavapura house. Following the decline of its sisters Dvaravati's Lavapura and Ayojjhapura to the west in the Pasak Valley, its chief city at Muang Sema was then left abandoned and was replaced by the Hindu polity of Khorakhapura.

There are some relations between the houses of Vimayapura and Mahidharapura, as they both were of the Solar dynasty; the line of Mahidharapura house at Kasitindrakama begins with the king Surya, while the earliest king of Vimayapura was Soryavarman, as mentioned in the K.1000 Inscription. Mahidharapura monarchs were believed to be the descendants of Bhavavarman I of Chenla. Meanwhile, the house of Canasapura at Muang Sema was possibly part of the Bhavapura dynasty.

A Japanese historian, Tatsuo Hoshino, proposes that around the 8th century, Canasapura was probably under the control of Tai-speaking people, who then expanded their political and military influence to the Pasak and Chao Phraya Basins a few centuries later.

House of Mahidharapura		House of Vimayapura		House of Canasapura (Under Qiān Zhī Fú) (Note: According to a recent interpretive framework, Canasapura may have been centered at Si Thep, a site referred to in mid–7th-century Chinese sources as Qiān Zhī Fú. Following its territorial expansion during the eighth to ninth centuries to encompass the western Menam Valley and Mueang Sema, the polity appears in Chinese texts under the names Gē Luó Shě Fēn or Jiā Luó Shě Fú (迦逻舍佛). Under this interpretation, monarchs previously regarded as rulers of Mueang Sema should instead be understood as having reigned from Si Thep.)	
Chief city: Kasitindrakama (Phanom Rung)		Chief city: Vimayapura (Phimai)		Chief cities: Canasapura (Muang Sema–Si Thep)	
Unknown Surya king (Note: According to the evidence found at the Prasat Phanom Rung, the polity existed at least since the 7th–8th centuries, but no inscription related to its rulers was provided.)	c. 7th–8th century	Soryavarman	c. 7th–8th century	Unknown	c. 700
Under Qiān Zhī Fú (Note: According to the Chronicle of Padumasūriyavaṁśa, during the reign of Padumasūriyavaṁśa (r. 757–800) his authority extended eastward to Talung (เมืองตลุง or ตะลุมดอ), a polity that corresponds geographically to the area of the modern Prakhon Chai District.)	757–c. 920	Nrpendradhiphati....varman?	c. 7th–8th century		
Under Qiān Zhī Fú	757–c. 920	Nrpendradhiphativarman? (Note: Son of the previous.)	c. 8th century?	Abandoned?	
Under Qiān Zhī Fú	757–c. 920	Under Qiān Zhī Fú	757–c. 920	Ansadeva	c. 864
Mahidharavarman I	c. 920	Narapatisimhavarman (Note: Son of Sundararavarman.) (Ruled from Si Thep, later fell under Rajendravarman II of Angkor)	937–971	Bhagadatta	early 10th-c.
Prithivindra	c. 960	Mangalavarman (Note: Younger brother of the previous.) (Ruled from Mueang Sema, under Angkorian influence)	971–986	Sri Sundaraprakrama	early 10th-c.
Mahidharavarman II	c. 1000	Rajapativarman	986–1001	Sri Sundararavarman	?–937
Hiranyavarman	c. 1040	Unknown	c. 1046	Narapatisimhavarman	937–970
Unknown (Note: Son-in-law of the previous)	?–1107?	Jayavarman VI (Control over Vimayapura came under Mahidharapura)	Before 1080 (Note: Son of Hiranyavarman. Before claiming Yaśodharapura of Angkor in 1080.)–1107	The settlement was abandoned in the 10th century, and was succeeded by Khorakhapura.	
Suryavarman II (Note: Grand son of Hiranyavarman. Before claiming Yaśodharapura of Angkor in 1113.)	1107?–1150?	Virendradhipativarman	c. 1108	The settlement was abandoned in the 10th century, and was succeeded by Khorakhapura.	
		Dharanindravarman I (Note: Elder brother of the previous.)	?–1113	The settlement was abandoned in the 10th century, and was succeeded by Khorakhapura.	

=== Mahidharapura Kingdom: 1080 – 1113 ===
Hiranyavarman was claimed to be the descendant of both the Mahidharapura and Vimayapura clans. He reigned at Kasitindrakama, while Vimayapura was ruled by his oldest son, Jayavarman VI, who later conquered Yaśodharapura in 1080.

After Suryavarman II, who succeeded his grandfather–Hiranyavarman–at Kasitindrakama, annexed both Vimayapura and Yaśodharapura, and moved his seat to a newly conquered Yaśodharapura in 1113, Vimayapura and Kasitindrakama then considered de facto vassals of Angkor.

Name		Reign	Seat	Note
English	Thai	Reign	Seat	Note
Jayavarman VI of the Mahidharapura house at Vimayapura annexed Yaśodharapura in 1080, the line was then split into two seats, Kasitindrakama and Vimayapura–Yaśodharapura
Unknown		?–1107?	Kasitindrakama (central seat)	Son-in-law of Hiranyavarman.
Jayavarman VI	ชัยวรมันที่ 6	1080?–1107	Vimayapura (northern seat)	Son of the Hiranyavarman.
Jayavarman VI	ชัยวรมันที่ 6	1080–1088	Yaśodharapura (southern seat) (Note: Jayavarman VI married to Vijayendralakshmi, a younger sister of Nripatindravarman, who helped Jayavarman VI in a campaign against Harshavarman III or his successor, thus, the throne at Yaśodharapura was then given to Nripatindravarman. Nripatindravarman was probably a son of the previous Angkorian king, Udayadityavarman II.)	Son of the Hiranyavarman.
After the reign of Jayavarman VI, the line was split into three seats, Vimayapara, Kasitindrakama and Yaśodharapura.
Dharanindravarman I	ธรณีนทรวรมันที่ 1	1107–1113	Vimayapura (northern seat)	Elder brother of the previous.
Suryavarman II	สุริยวรมันที่ 2	1107?–1150	Kasitindrakama (central seat)	Grandson of Hiranyavarman. Also King of Yaśodharapura (r. 1113–1150)
Nripatindravarman	นฤปตินทราทิตยวรมัน	1088–1113	Yaśodharapura (southern seat)	Son of Udayadityavarman II?
Suryavarman II annexed the southern and northern seats and became King of Angkor, thus, the Phimai region was merged with Angkor.
From 1113 to the early 1300s: Phimai region was under Yaśodharapura rule.
Unknown		1150?–late-12c.	Kasitindrakama	Son-in-law of Suryavarman II
Narendraditya	นเรนทราทิตย์	Late-12c.	Kasitindrakama	Builder of Prasat Phanom Rung. Son of the previous.
Hiranya	หิรัณยะ	Early-13c.	Kasitindrakama	Builder of Phanom Rung Inscriptions
Rulers after Hiranya remain unknown. Mahidharapura center in the Phimai region was gradually shifted from Kasitindrakama to Vimayapura after Angkor's power waned.
After the reign of the Angkorian Jayavarman VII (r. 1181–1218), Angkor began to decline and suffered a devastating war against Siam in the late 13th century. There is no additional record about the Phimai region. In 1336, the house of Mahidharapura at Angkor was overthrown by the house of Trasak Paem.
