= Mahidharapura =

Reigning dynasty of the Angkor Empire

House of Mahindharapura រាជវង្សមហិធរៈបុរៈ ราชวงศ์มหิธรปุระ Mahidrapura, Mahitarapura
- Royal house
- Current region: Northeast Thailand, Angkor
- Etymology: Mahidhar
- Origin: Mun basin near Phimai
- Founded: 1080
- Founder: Hiranyavarman
- Final ruler: Jayavarman IX
- Historic seat: Phimai (Vimayapura)
- Titles: Varman, Varmadeva
- Style: Preah Bat Kamratenh Anh Sri
- Members: 12
- Connected members: Jayavarman VI; Suryavarman I Jayavarman VII
- Estate: Yasodharapura
- Deposition: 1336

Mahidharapura Dynasty (Khmer: រាជវង្សមហិធរៈបុរៈ; Thai: ราชวงศ์มหิธรปุระ; Roman: House of Mahidharapura, Mahidra-pura) was a Khmer Empire dynasty established by King Jayavarman VI. It lasted from 1080 to 1336 and was based in Phimai, Thailand. The pivotal moment of the rise of this northern Khmer Nobility to power led to the replacement of the previous dynasty of Suryavarman I. However, the dynastic conflict ended when Dharanindravarman II married Queen Sri Jayarajacudamani of the earlier dynasty, which gave birth to Jayavarman VII who later consolidated power and unified the empire.

== History ==
The earliest recorded member of the Mahidharapura dynasty was a petty king by the name of Hiranyavarman, father of the first Mahidharapura emperor Jayavarman VI. The royal line of Mahidharapura, prior to imperial ascension, were the rulers of Phimai (now Phimai District Nakhon Ratchasima Province), being one of the many extended families of Khmer kings who settled in the Mun River basin near Prasat Phanom Wan, Prasat Phimai, Pradsat Phanom Rung, and the area of Lavo. It was an ancient royal family since the Funan era, having influence and power base in the southeast region and the Dângrêk Mountains mountain range. There were eleven monarchs in Mahidharpura, the first of which was Jayavarman VI and the last was Jayavarman IX (Jayavarmadiparamesvara).

== List of Mahidharapura monarchs ==
1. Hiranyavarman
2. Jayavarman VI
3. Dharanindravarman I
4. Suryavarman II
5. Dharanindravarman II
6. Jayavarman VII
7. Yasovarman II
8. Indravarman II
9. Jayavarman VIII
10. Indravarman III
11. Indrajayavarman
12. Jayavarman IX

=== Family tree ===
Family tree of Mahidharapura dynasty from Phanom Rung stone inscription No. 7 in Buriram province, Thailand.

- King of Angkor
- Crown Prince
- Prince

_{Surya (ศรีสุริยะวงศ์)} King of Sun	Queen Lakshmi
Hiranyavarman _{of Kasitindrakram}	Her Majesty Hiranyalakshmi
^{(2)} Dharanindravarman I	^{(1)} Jayavarman VI _{of Phimai}	Crown Prince _{ศรียุวราช (Die)}	Her Royal Highness Princess	Prince (1)
Kasitindraditya _{grandchild of Hiranyavarman}	Queen Consort _{(Narendradityalakshmi)}
Queen of Angkor	^{(3)} Suryavarman II
Prince (2)	Her Royal Highness Princess of King Suryavarman II _{(ภูปตีนทรลักษมี)}
Narendraditya _{of Phanom Rung (The builder of Phanom Rung castle)}	Princess
Hiranya _{of Phanom Rung (The creator of Phanom Rung stone inscription No. 7)}

== Dynasty Fusion ==
During the reign of Dharanindravarman II, successor of Suryavarman II, a significant dynastic fusion took place between two major royal lineages of the Khmer Empire — the line of Jayavarman VI and that of the earlier dynasty founded by Suryavarman I. King Dharanindravarman II, a descendant of Jayavarman VI, strengthened his claim to the throne and unified the royal bloodlines by marrying Queen Sri Jayarajacudamani, the daughter of Harshavarman III, who was himself the son of Suryavarman I. Through this dynastic fusion, they gave birth to King Jayavarman VII. Upon his succession to throne in 1181, Jayavarman VII's soft power symbolized the reconciliation and consolidation of two rival dynasties, fostering political stability and legitimizing his rule over a reunified empire, leading the ancient Khmer Kingdom to its peak in history.
