= Nripatindravarman =

Cambodian king (c. 1122–1218)

Nripatindravarman II ន្ឫបតីន្ទ្រវម៌្មទី២
- Nripatindradityavarman

King of the Khmer Empire
- Reign: 1088–1113
- Predecessor: Harshavarman III; Jayavarman VI
- Successor: Suryavarman II
- Born: Angkor, Khmer Empire
- Died: Yaśodharapura, Khmer Empire
Names
- Nrpendradhipativarman
- House: Yasodharapura
- Dynasty: Varman
- Father: Udayadityavarman II
- Religion: Hinduism

Nripatindravarman II (Khmer: ន្ឫបតីន្ទ្រវម៌្មទី២, Thai: นฤปตินทราทิตยวรมัน)

== Biography ==
It is possible that Harshavarman III was succeeded by a king named Nripatindravarman who reigned in Angkor until 1113 and that Jayavarman VI never reigned there. He was possibly an elder brother of Vijayendralakshmi. In fact Suryavarman II claimed to have seized power from two kings; one was his uncle Dharanindravarman I of which there is no inscription in Angkor; the other can only be Nripatindravarman.

Regnal titles
Preceded by Harshavarman III	Emperor of Angkor; 1080–1113	Succeeded by Dharanindravarman I

== Bibliography ==
- G. Coedès (1968), The Indianized States of Southeast Asia, Honolulu: University of Hawaii Press
