= Jayavarman VI =

- King of Khmer empire
- Reign: 1080–1107
- Predecessor: Harshavarman III
- Successor: Dharanindravarman I Mahidhara; Nripatindravarman Yasodhara
- Died: 1107
- Spouse: Vijayendralakshmi
Posthumous name
- Paramakaivalyapada
- House: Mahidharapura
- Dynasty: Varman
- Father: Hiranyavarman
- Mother: Hiranyalakshmi

Jayavarman VI (Khmer: ជ័យវរ្ម័នទី៦) was king of the Khmer Empire from about 1080 to 1107 AD.

== History ==
During the reigns of Udayadityavarman II and Harshavarman III there were some internal rebellions and an unsuccessful war with Champa. Maybe the last one continued to reign in Angkor during a revolt which finally brought to power the following official King, Jayavarman VI, probably a vassal prince.

Coming from Phimai area, in Mun River Valley, he appears as an usurper and the founder of a new dynasty, the Mahidharapura, from the name of his family's ancestral home. In inscriptions at the beginning of his reign, he claimed to be a descendant of the mythical couple of prince Sage Kambu Swayambhuva and his sister (and wife) Mera, rather than having real ancestors of royal lineage.

Jayavarman VI was probably engaged for several years in strife against those who remained loyal to the legitimate line of Harshavarman III and his heir Nripatindravarman which may have reigned in Angkor until 1113.

However, he is generally given credit for the construction of Phimai temple. He was succeeded by his elder brother, Dharanindravarman I, and received as posthumous name Paramakaivalyapada.

== Footnotes ==
Regnal titles
Preceded by Harshavarman III	Emperor of Angkor; 1080–1107	Succeeded by Dharanindravarman I
