= Harshavarman III =

- King of Cambodia
- Reign: 1066–1080
- Predecessor: Udayadityavarman II
- Successor: Jayavarman VI
- Died: 1080
- Issue: Sri Jayarajacudamani
Names
- Narapatindravarman
Posthumous name
- Sadaśivapada
- Father: Yasovarman I
- Religion: Hinduism

Harshavarman III (Khmer: ហស៌វរ្ម័នទី៣) was a king of Khmer who ruled from 1066 to about 1080 AD. He succeeded his elder brother Udayadityavarman II and his capital was the so-called Second Yasodharapura, which had its center in Baphuon, built by his brother, and West Baray as its principal bàrày. He was married to queen Kambujarajalakshmi.

His reign was upset by internal rebellions that finally he was not able to battle out. So Harshavarman III was the last ruler of his dynasty. His successor, Jayavarman VI, was an usurper who came from Phimai area, on the Khorat Plateau, in present-day Thailand. Harshavarman received the posthumous name of Sadaśivapada.

He was named in stele K.908 at Preah Khan as a maternal ancestor of Jayavarman VII, even if a long dispute rose out of this issue.

Between 1074 and 1080, the kingdom had to undergo the invasion by the Champa Prince Pang, a younger brother of the Champa king Harivarman IV, and himself the future king Paramabodhisattva. Sambhupra temples were destroyed and the inhabitants were taken into slavery to My Son, including the prince Sri Nandavarmadeva.

In 1076, Cambodia and Champa were driven by the Song Chinese in an attack against the Tonkin. The defeat of the Chinese army from Đại Việt brought before the retirement of its allies.

== Footnotes ==
Regnal titles
Preceded by Udayadityavarman II	Emperor of Angkor; 1066–1080	Succeeded by Jayavarman VI
