= Prasat Phanom Wan =

Khmer Buddhist temple

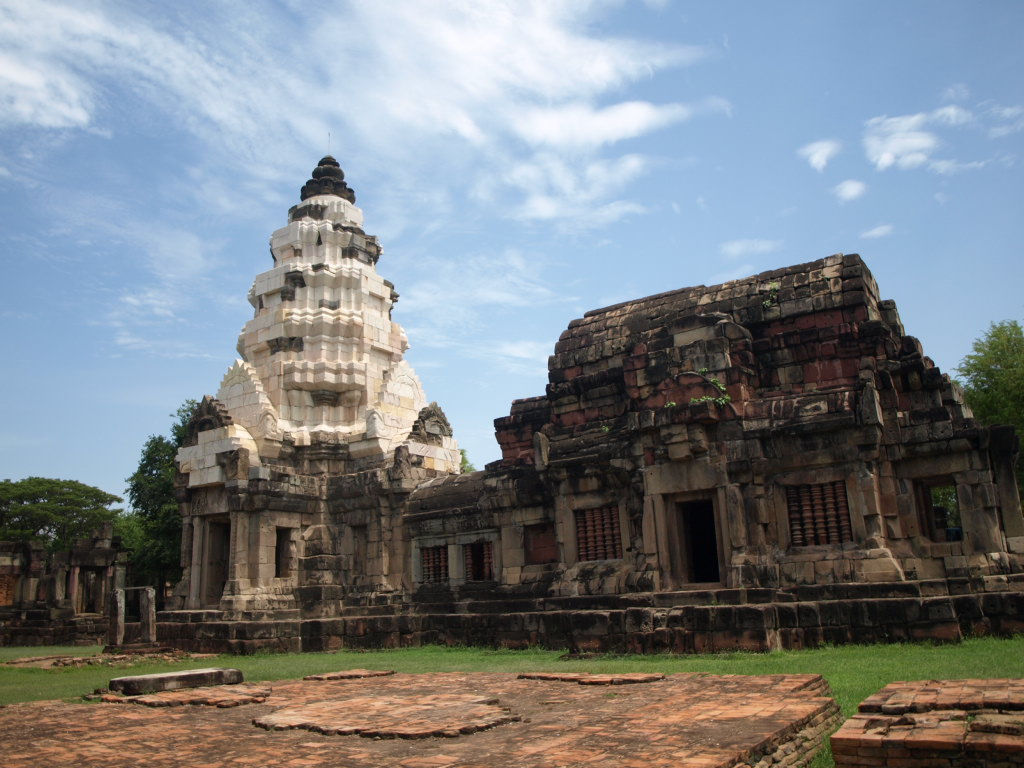

- Location in Thailand

Religion
- Affiliation: Buddhism
- District: Mueang Nakhon Ratchasima
- Province: Nakhon Ratchasima
- Deity: Maheshwara

Location
- Location: Moo 6 Ban Makha, Ban Pho Subdistrict
- Country: Thailand
- Coordinates: 15.02°N 102.2°E

Architecture
- Completed: 14th century

Prasat Phanom Wan (Thai: ปราสาทพนมวัน, pronounced [prāː.sàːt pʰā.nōm wān]), also locally known as Wat Phanom Wan (Thai: วัดพนมวัน, pronounced [wát pʰā.nōm wān]) is an Theravada Buddhist temples in the area of Mueang Nakhon Ratchasima District, Nakhon Ratchasima Province. It was first constructed as a Hindu temple and later converted into a Buddhist temple, regarded as one of the largest Khmer Buddhist temple in Thailand.

It is believed that it was built in the 11th century. Later during the 13th-14th centuries, a stone building was built over it. It was the Hindu temple and later became a prominent Buddhist temple. Although most of the place was ruined, the main prang (Khmer style stupa) and a tiered stupa are still remaining. The main stupa facing east was built of sandstone and was connected to the cloister by a square path of 25.50 m (83.7 ft) length and 10.20 m (33.5 ft) width. The stupa has three arched gateways. In the north gate, it enshrines a standing Buddha statue in the posture of forgiveness according to the Ayutthaya style.

The sanctuary is surrounded by laterite wall, the southwest area is a sandstone stupa called "Prang Noi" (Thai: ปรางน้อย, pronounced [prāːŋ nɔ́ːj]) with the large Buddha statue inside. Outside the area comprises gopura (entrance) situated in the form of tall tower in four directions. The east side of the sanctuary features the trace of a baray (reservoir surrounding the Khmer Hindu temple is assumed to be a cosmic ocean in Hindu cosmology) and an earth hill.

There is also the pavilion to welcome Jayavarman VII or his representative who should have arrived at Phanom Wan in the 13th century to worship the Buddha statue.

Its Khmer style resembles Prasat Phimai in the same province but the size is smaller. It sited on the route between the Khorat (Nakhon Ratchasima City) and the Prasat Phimai. The sanctuary is now a recognised ancient monument in the year 1936 by the Fine Arts Department.

== Gallery ==
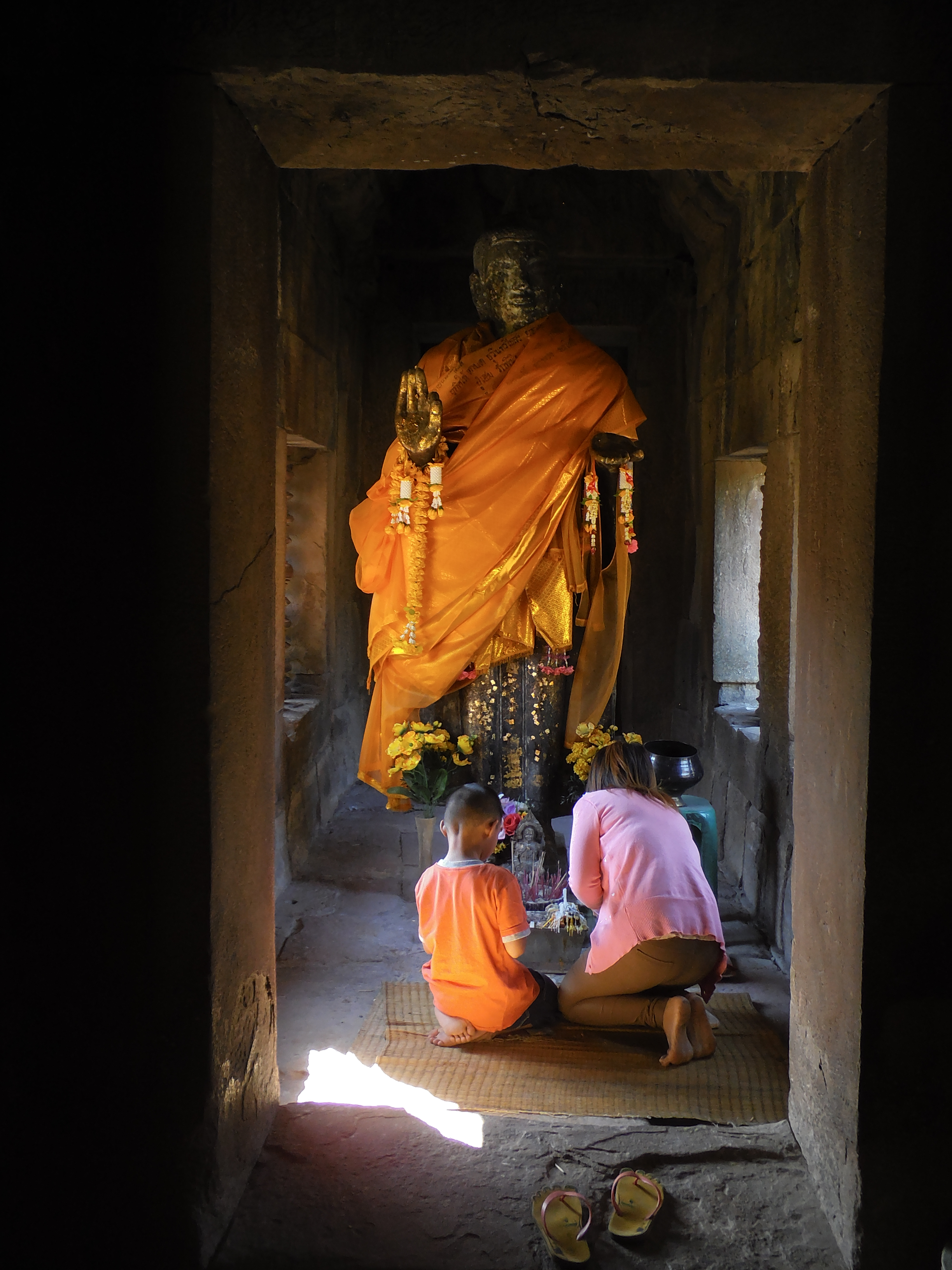
Principle Buddha statue

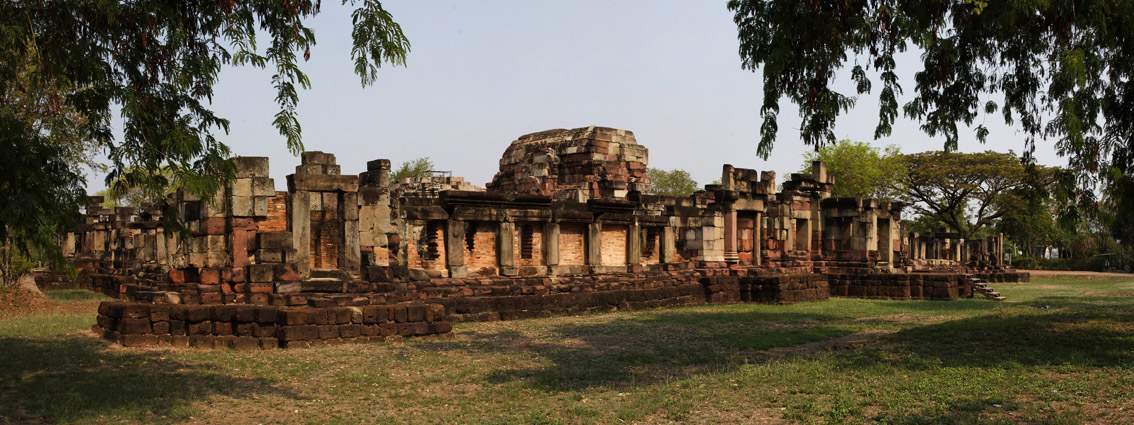
Outside the temple

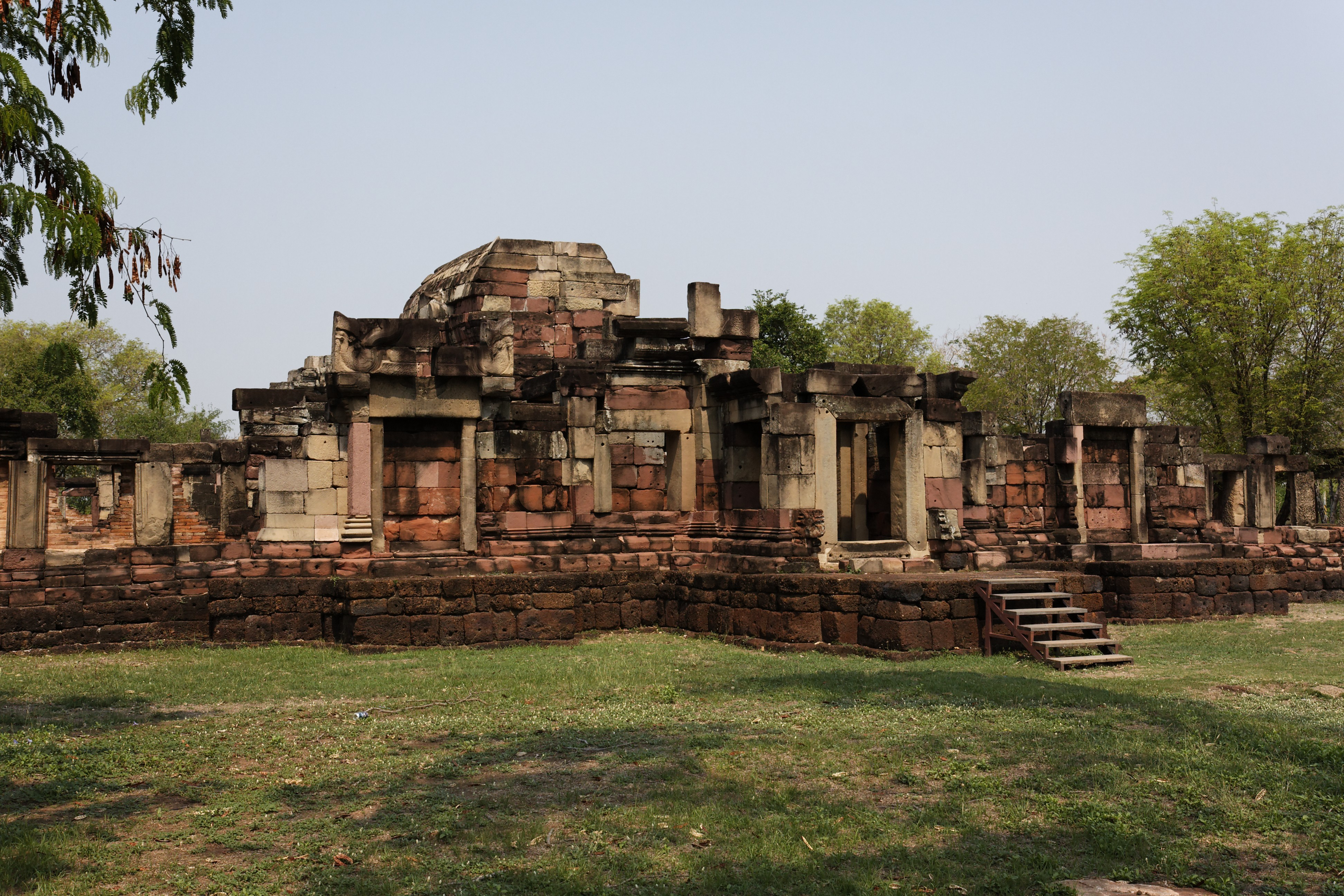
The temple

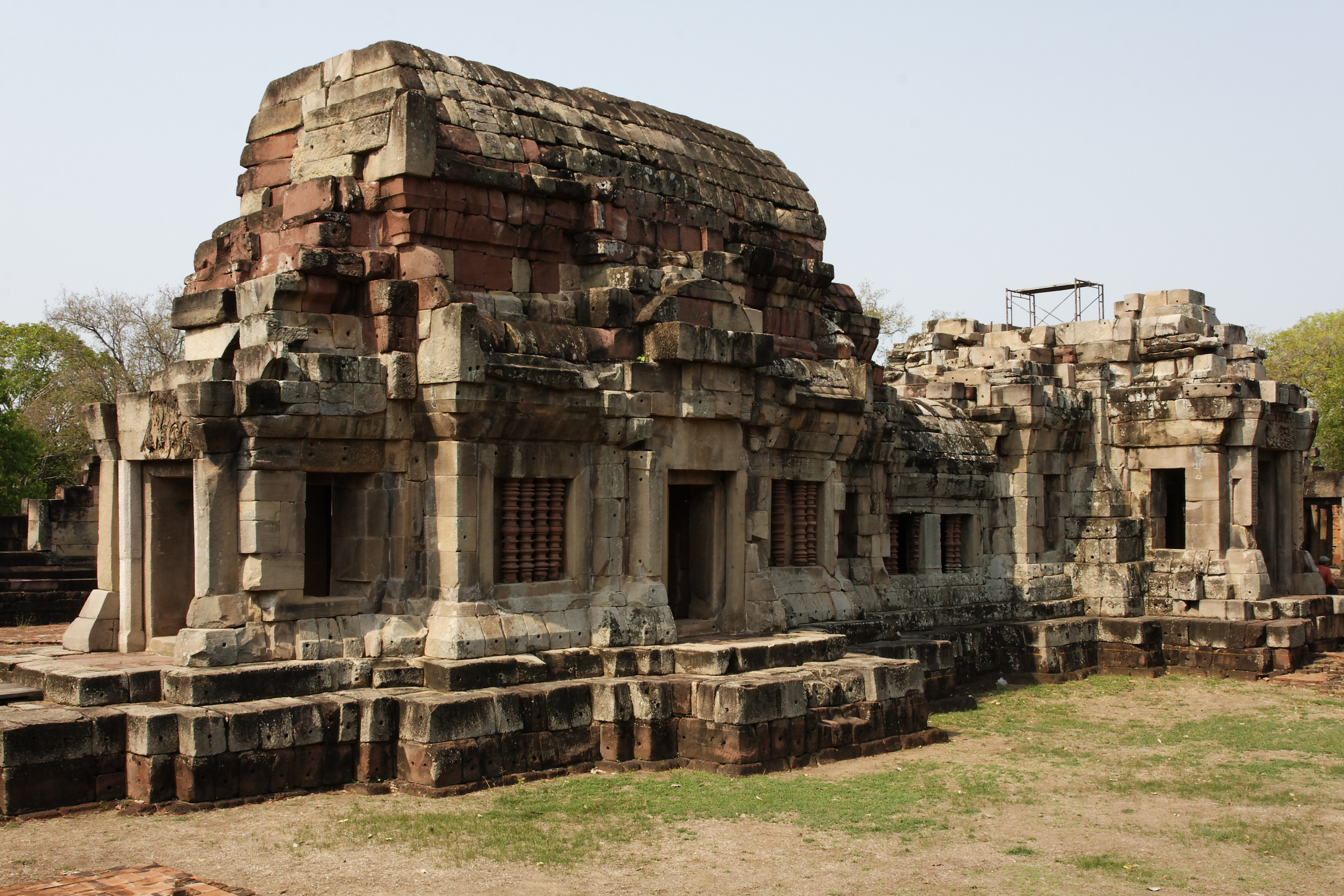
During restoration

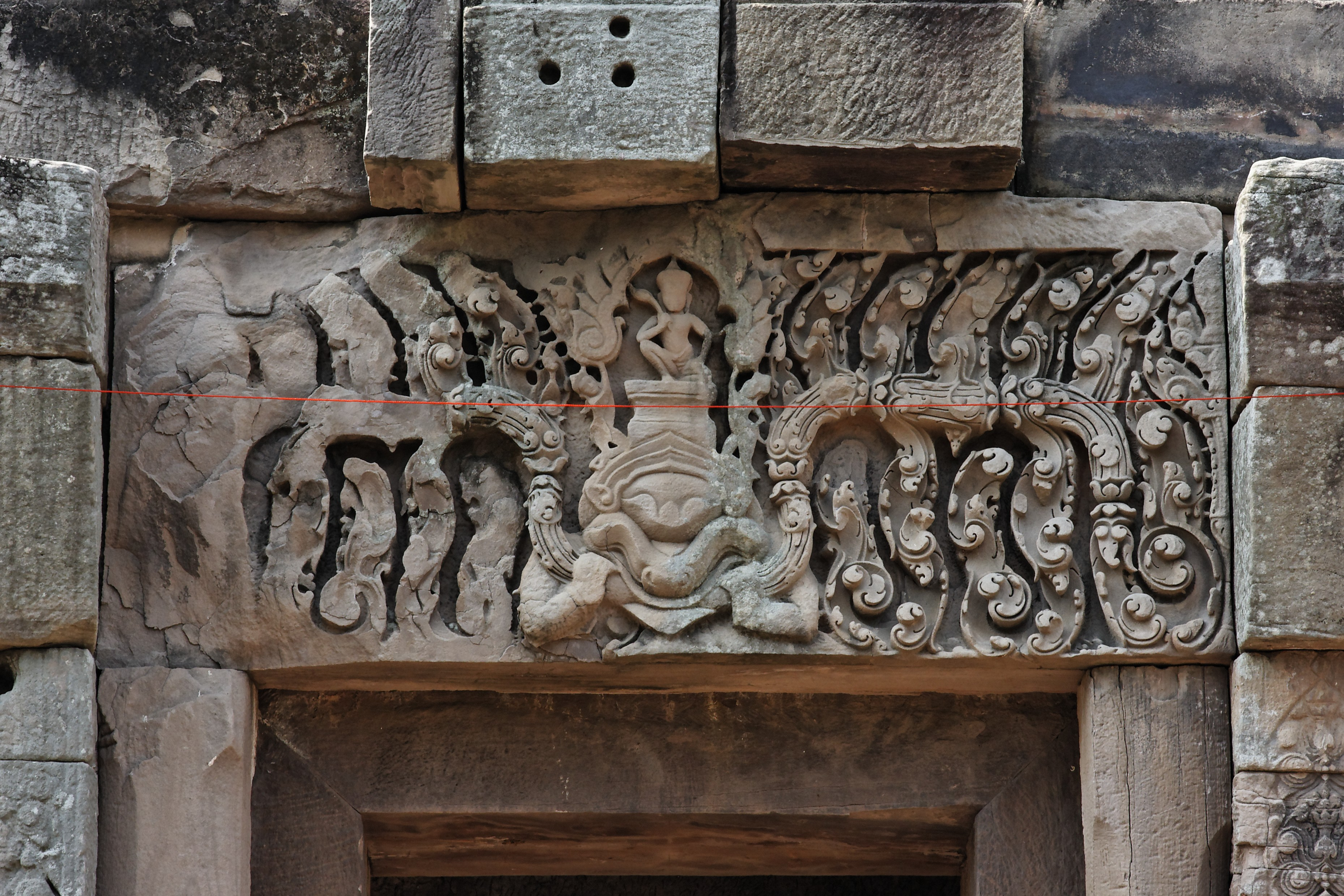
The lintel

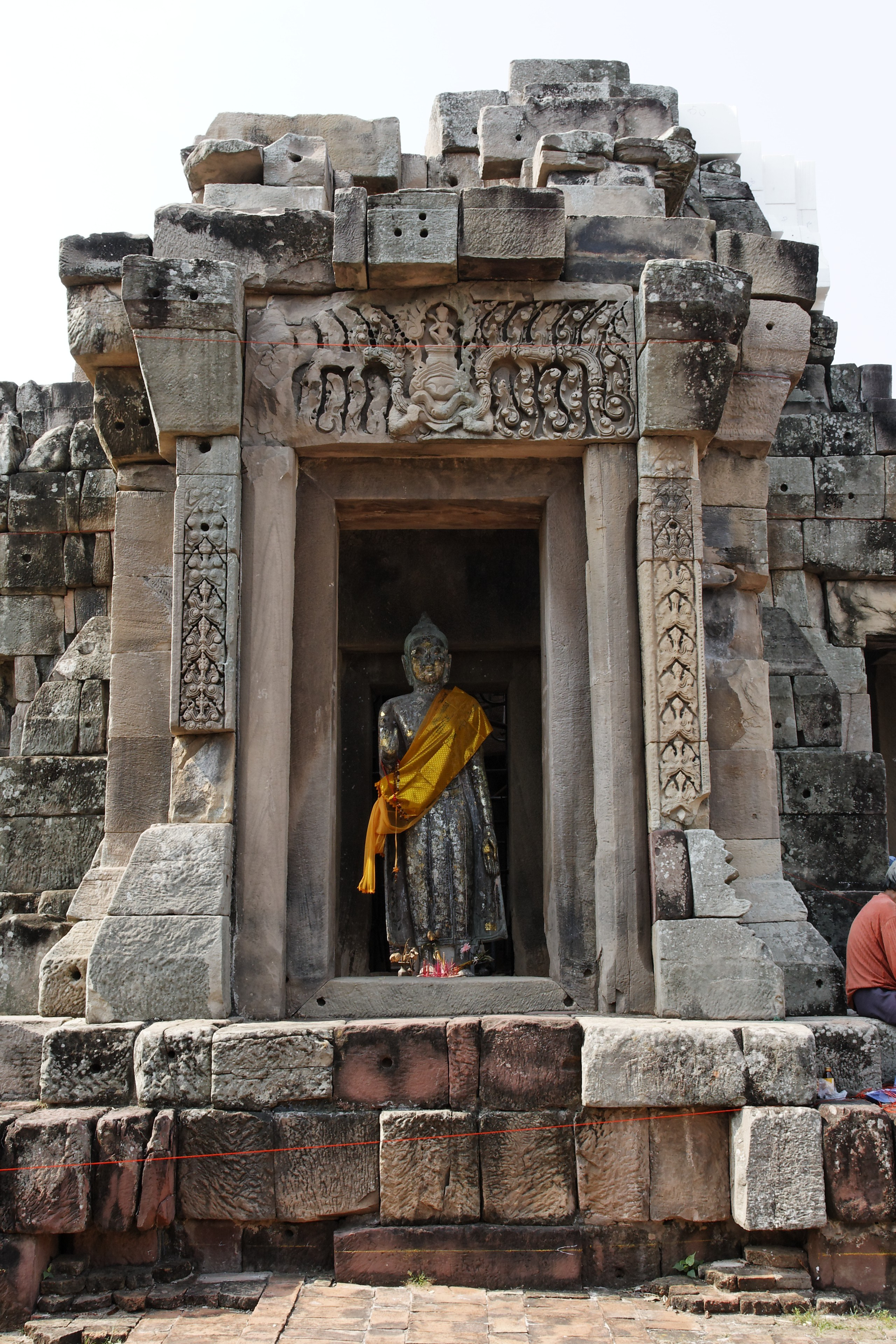
The lintel over Buddha statue

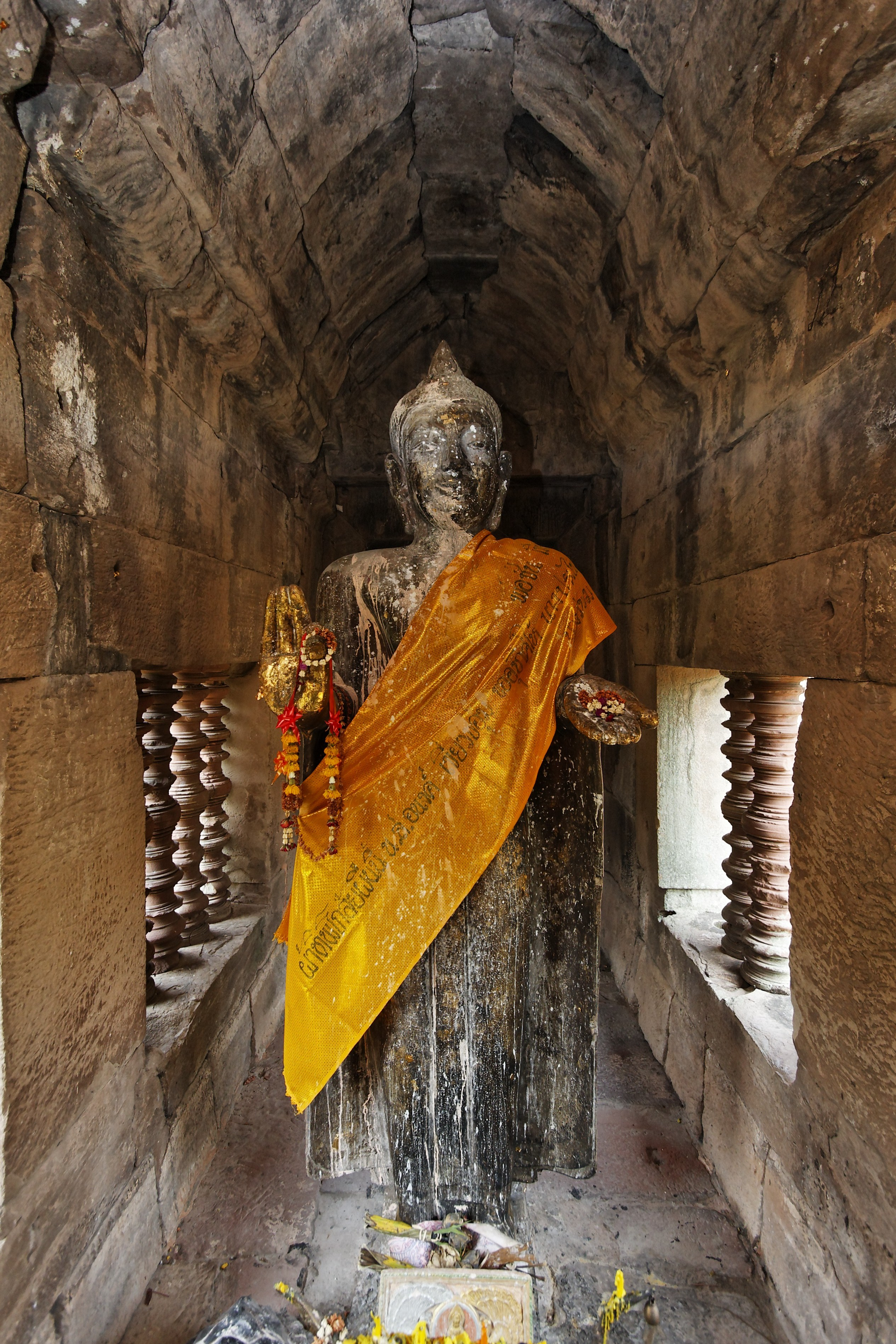
Standing Buddha statue

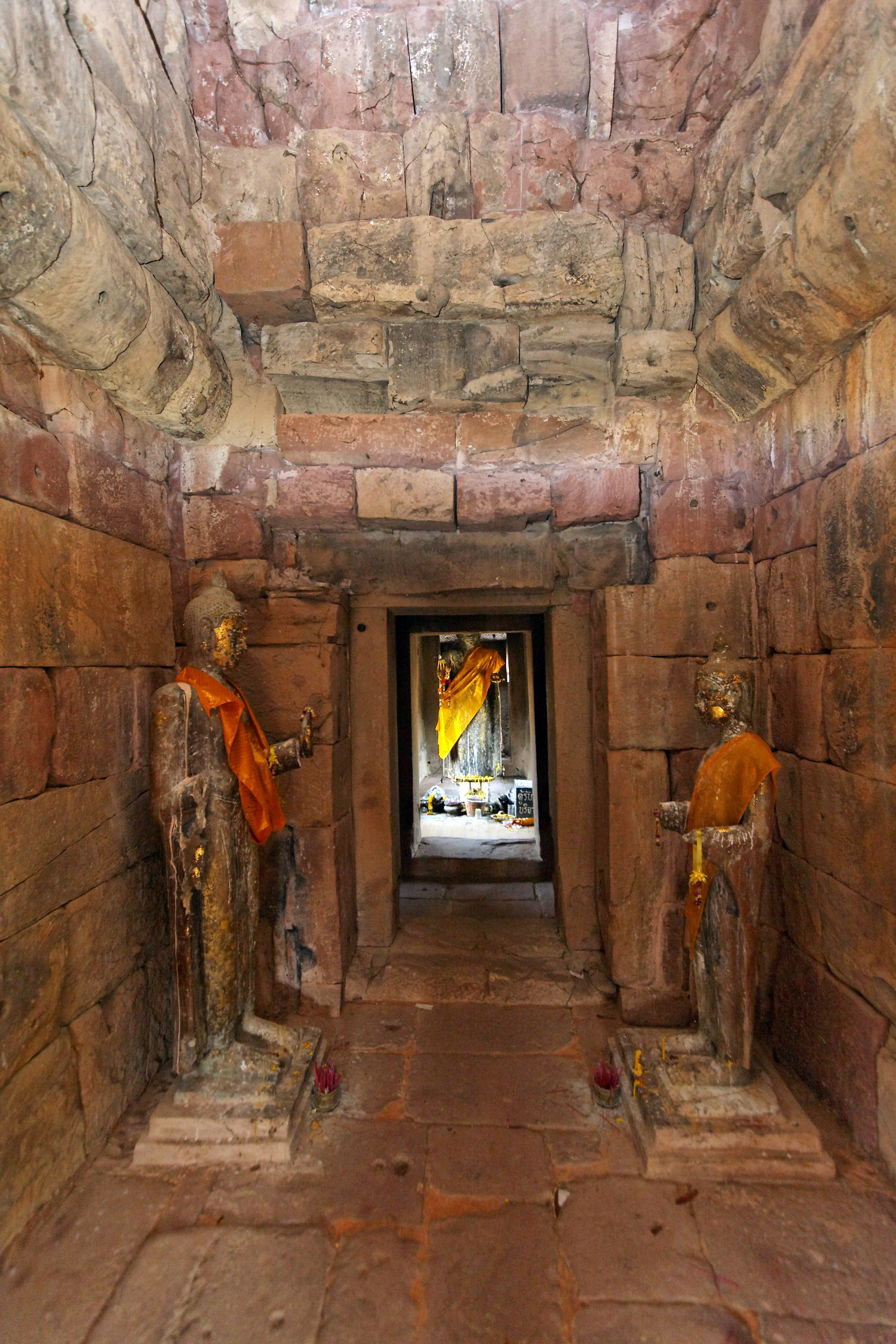
Inside the temple
