= Baphuon =

Buddhist temple at Angkor, Cambodia

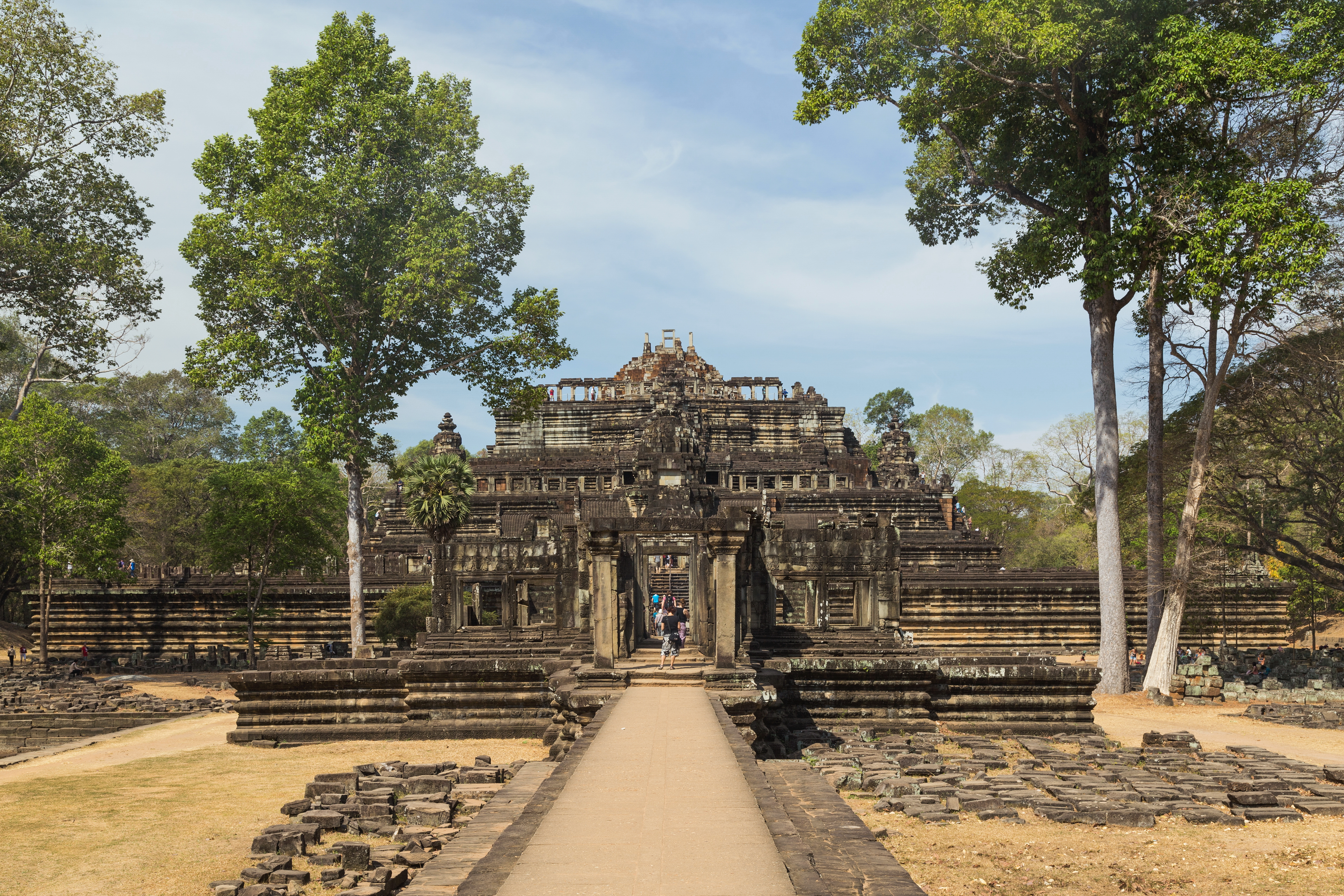

- Location within Cambodia

Religion
- Affiliation: Buddhism other_info =: Sect: [[{{{sect}}}]]

Location
- Location: Angkor Thom
- Country: Cambodia
- Coordinates: 13°26′37″N 103°51′21″E

Architecture
- Type: Khmer
- Creator: Udayadityavarman II
- Completed: the mid-11th century

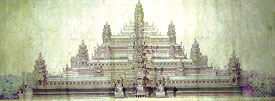
Pen and watercolor reconstruction of what the temple may have looked in the 11th century by Lucien Fournereau in 1889.

The Baphuon (Khmer: ប្រាសាទបាពួន) is a Buddhist temple at Angkor, Cambodia. It is located in Angkor Thom, northwest of the Bayon. Also called "golden mountain" (svarnādrī), the Baphuon is built on an artificial hill. The temple was originally dedicated to Shiva and late converted to a Theravada Buddhist temple.

The dating of the temple has been fractious; recent work has shown that it was not built during the reign of Udayādityavarman II, as is popularly reported. In 2015, a French team directly dates four iron crampons integrated into the structure using the AMS Carbon-14 method, revealed the construction was much earlier than thought and can now be considered as the major temple associated with Suryavarman I (1010–1050 CE), a ruler which had no temple previously associated with his reign.

== History ==
Built in the mid-11th century, it is a three-tiered temple mountain built as the state temple of Suryavarman I dedicated to the Hindu god Shiva. It is the archetype of the Baphuon style with intricate carvings covering every available surface. The temple adjoins the southern enclosure of the royal palace and measures 120 metres east–west by 100 metres north–south at its base and stands 34 meters tall without its tower, which would have made it roughly 50 meters tall. Its appearance apparently impressed Temür Khan's late 13th century envoy Zhou Daguan during his visit from 1296 to 1297, who said it was 'the Tower of Bronze...a truly astonishing spectacle, with more than ten chambers at its base.'

The Baphuon was later converted via Theravada Buddhist modifications that French scientists using AMS Carbon 14 have directly dated as a hundred years prior to the conventional 16th century estimation. This confirms that the adding of the reclining Buddha was related to the Ayutthayan occupation of Angkor circa 1430–1440CE, during a major period of political and religious instability.

A 9-meter tall by 70 meter long statue of a reclining Buddha was built on the west side's second level, which probably required the demolition of the 8-meter tower above to supply stones for the statue, thus explaining its current absence. The temple was built on land filled with sand, and due to its immense size the site was unstable throughout its history. Large portions had probably already collapsed by the time the Buddha was added.

Surrounded by a wall 125 by 425 m the central tower was probably gilded wood, which has not survived.

By the 20th century, much of the temple had largely collapsed, and restoration efforts took on an epic quality. A large-scale project to dismantle the temple so that its core could be re-enforced before the whole is re-constructed again—a process known as anastylosis—was abandoned after civil war broke out in 1970. The workers and archaeologists were forced to leave 300,000 carefully labelled and numbered blocks organized across 10 hectares surrounding the temple. However, the plans identifying the pieces were lost during the decade of conflict and the Khmer Rouge that followed.

A second project to restore the temple was launched in 1996 under the guidance of architect Pascal Royère from the EFEO. It took the team another 16 years to complete what had become known as the "largest 3D jigsaw puzzle in the world". In April 2011, after 51 years of work, the restoration was completed and the temple formally re-opened. King Norodom Sihamoni of Cambodia and Prime Minister François Fillon of France were among those who first toured the renovated temple during the inauguration ceremony on July 3, 2011.

== Gallery ==
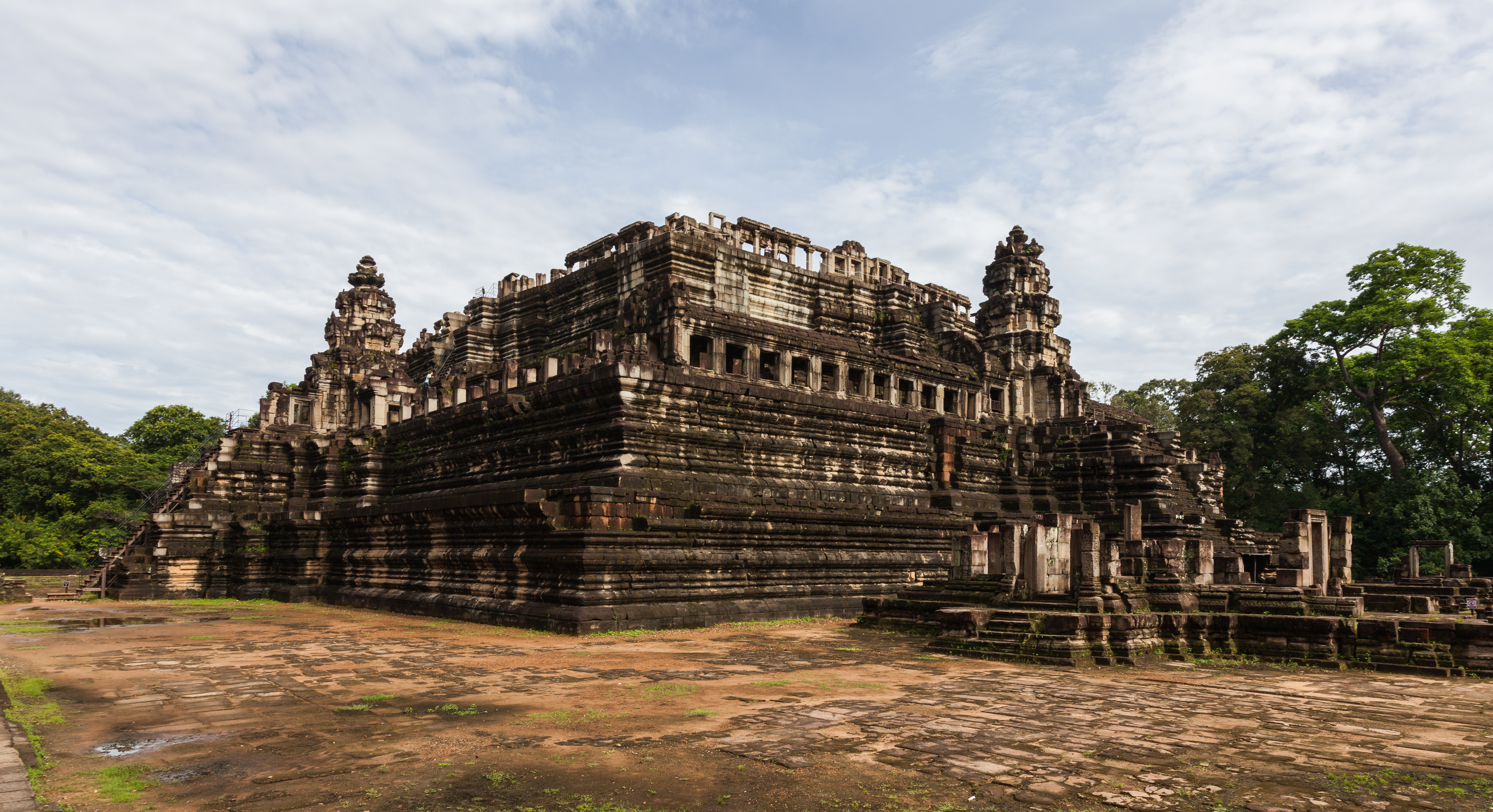

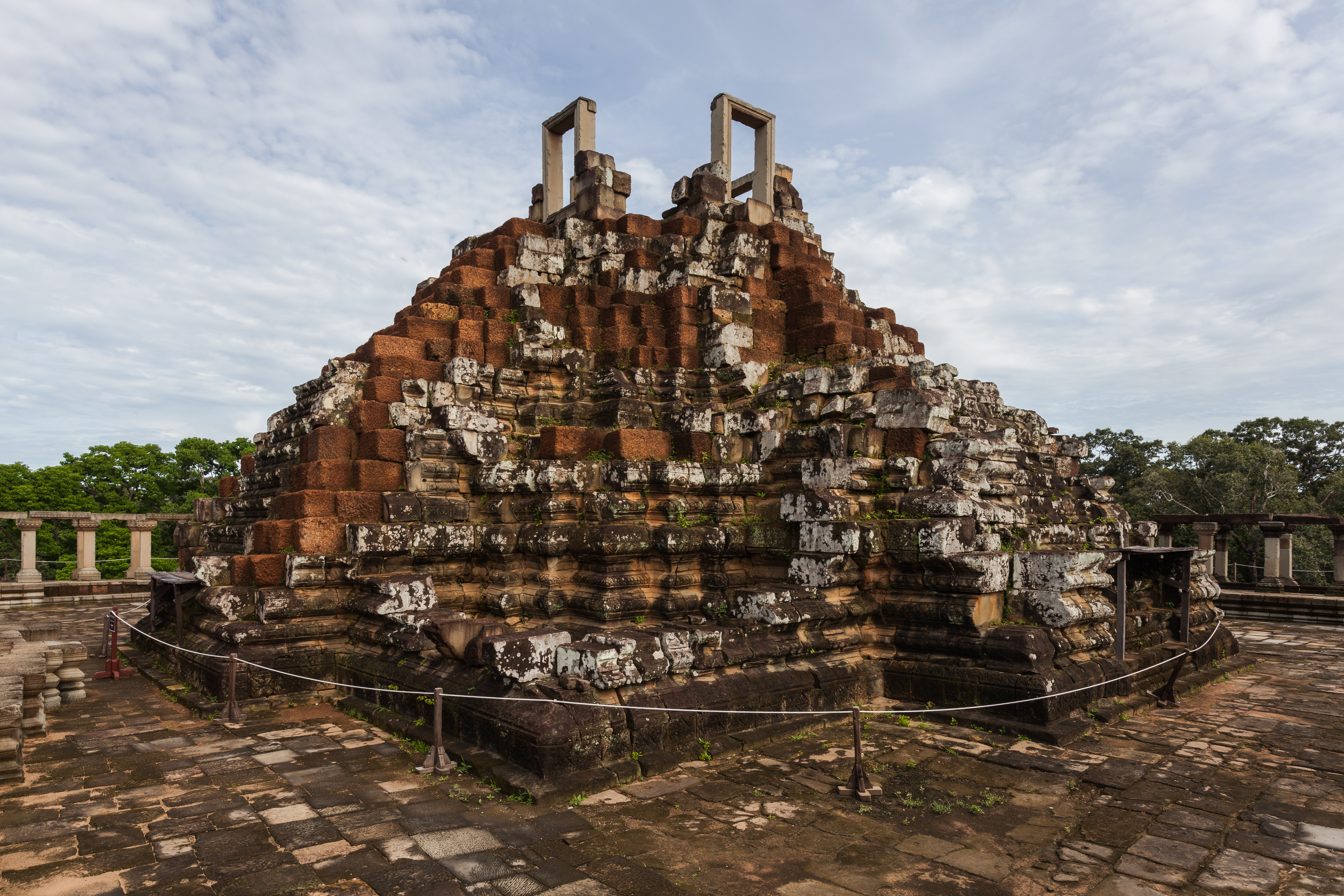

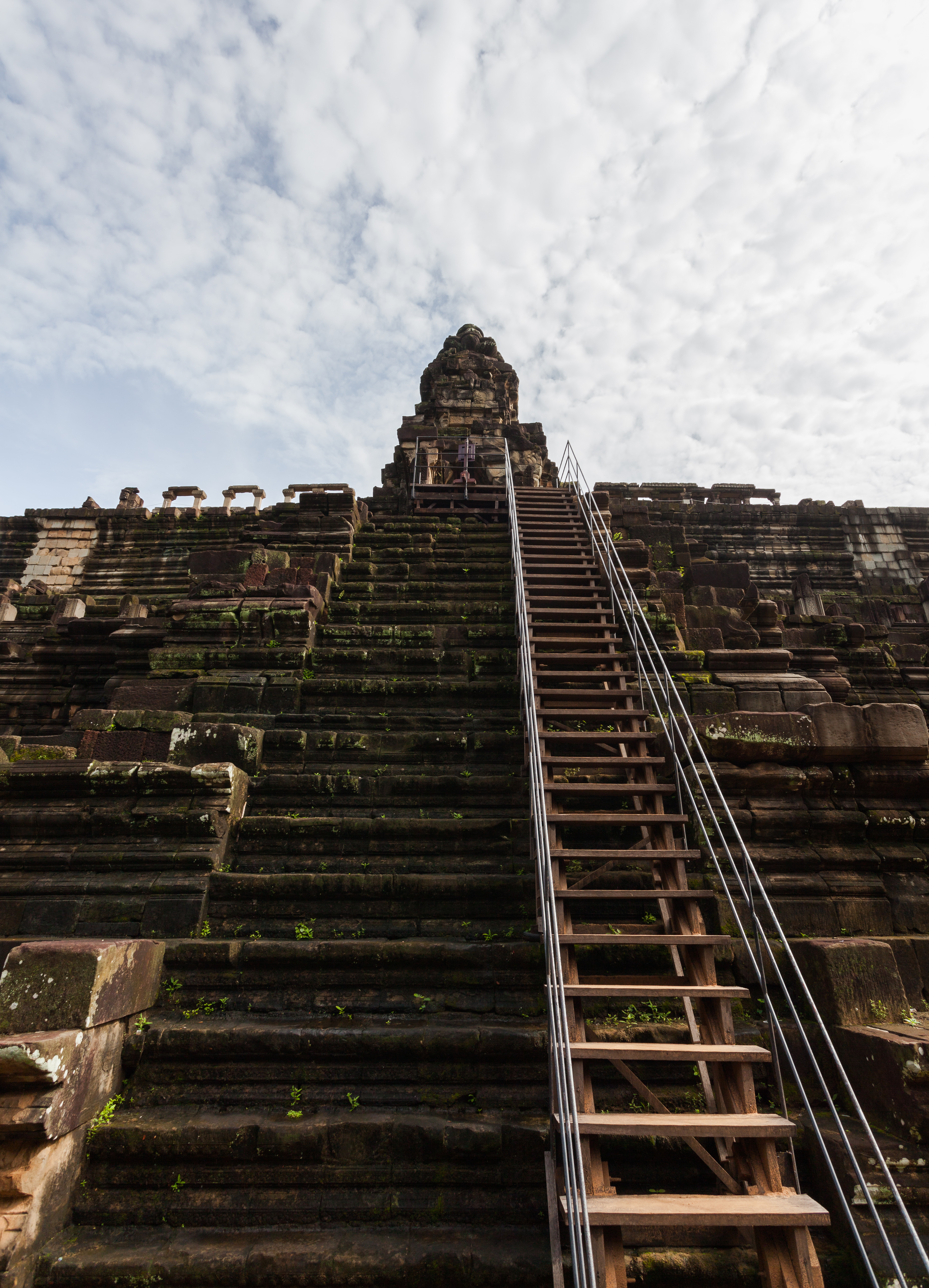

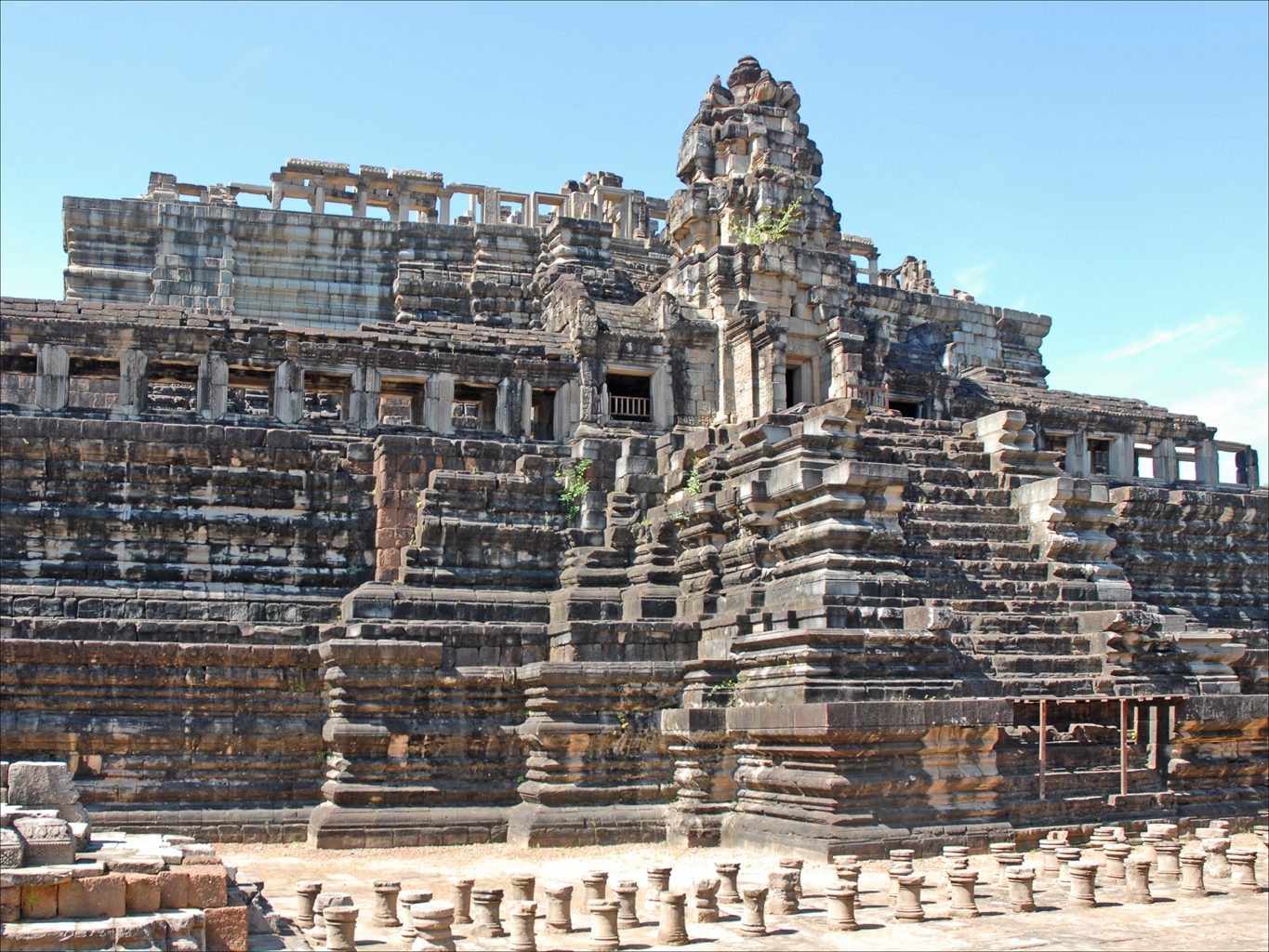

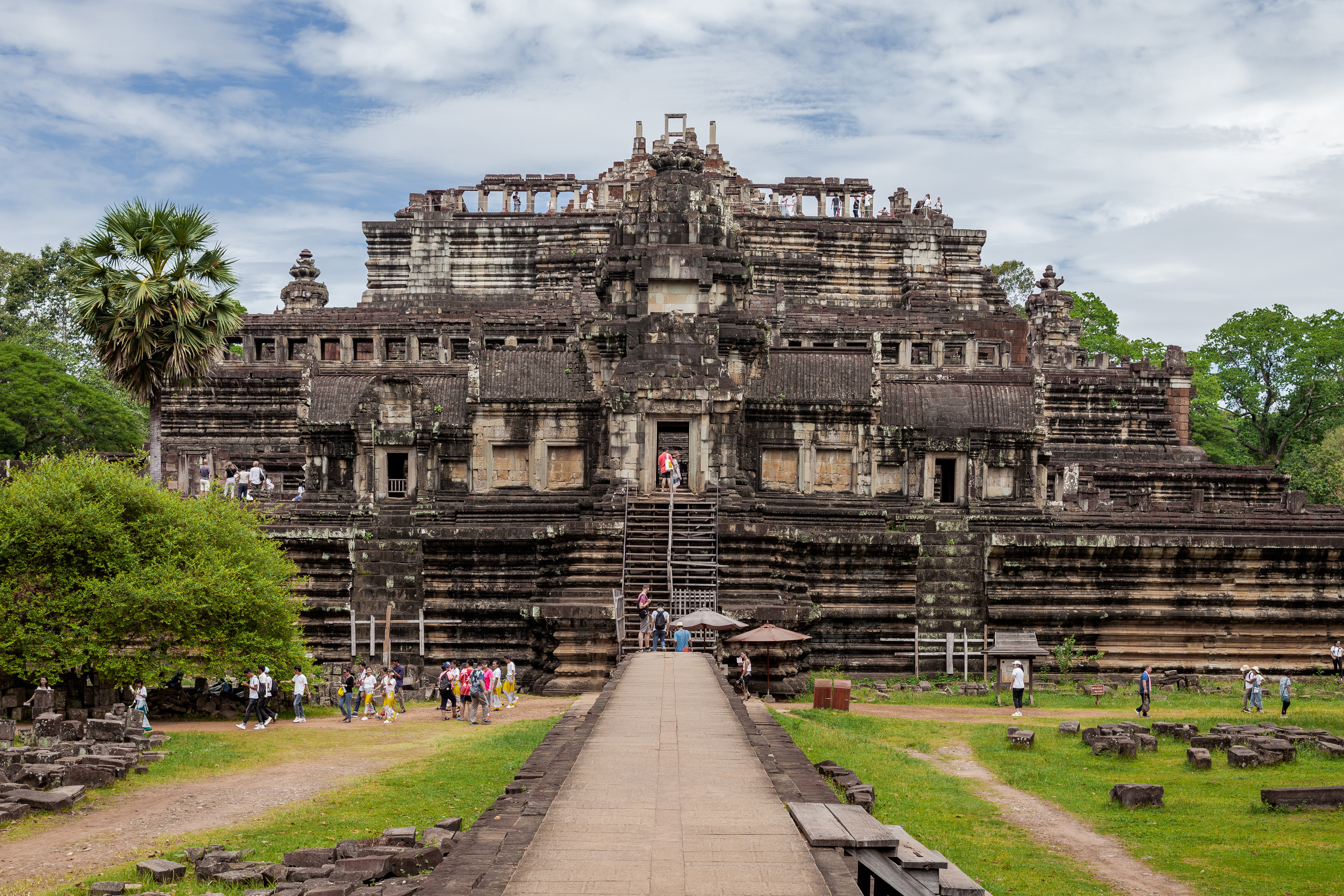

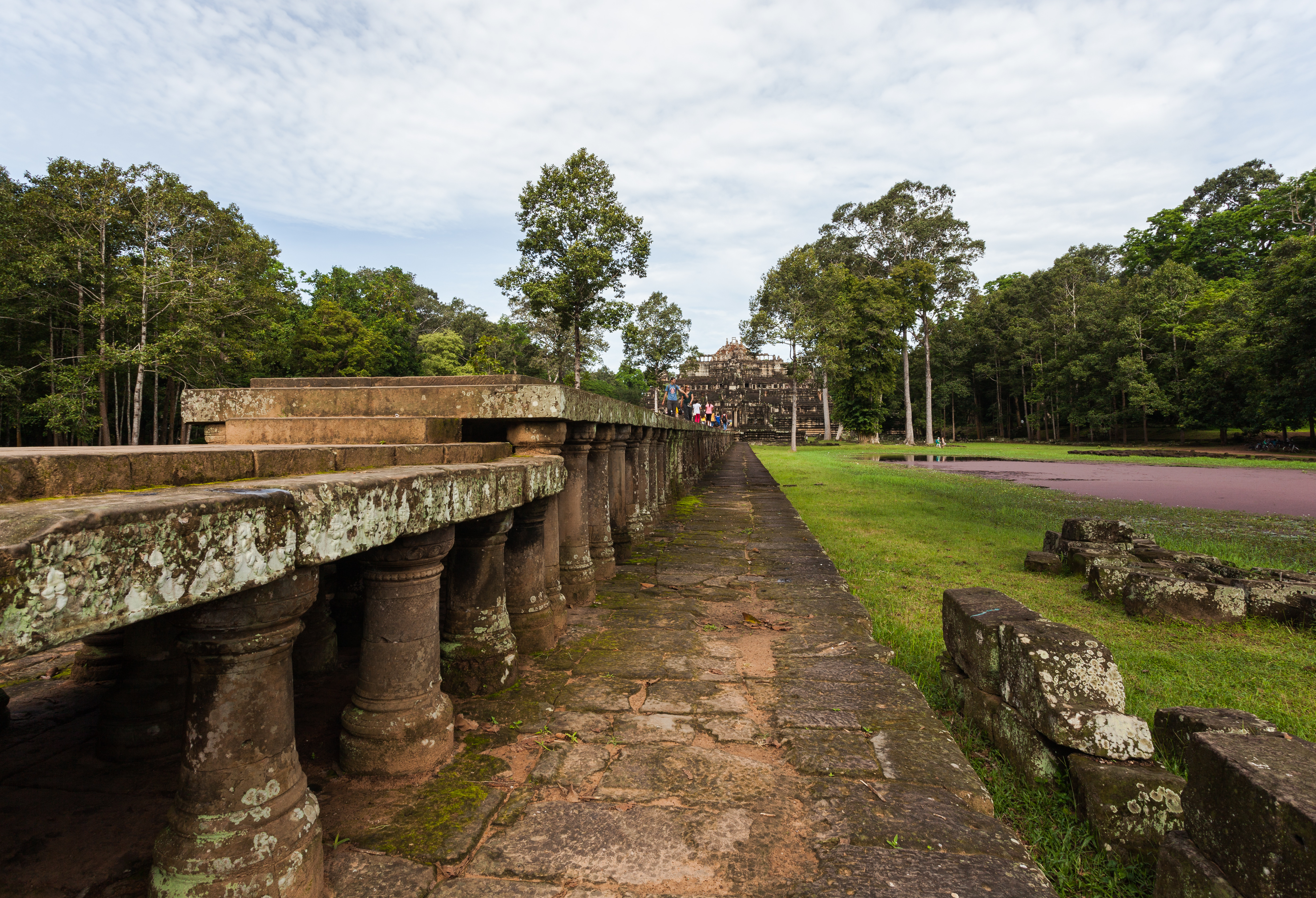

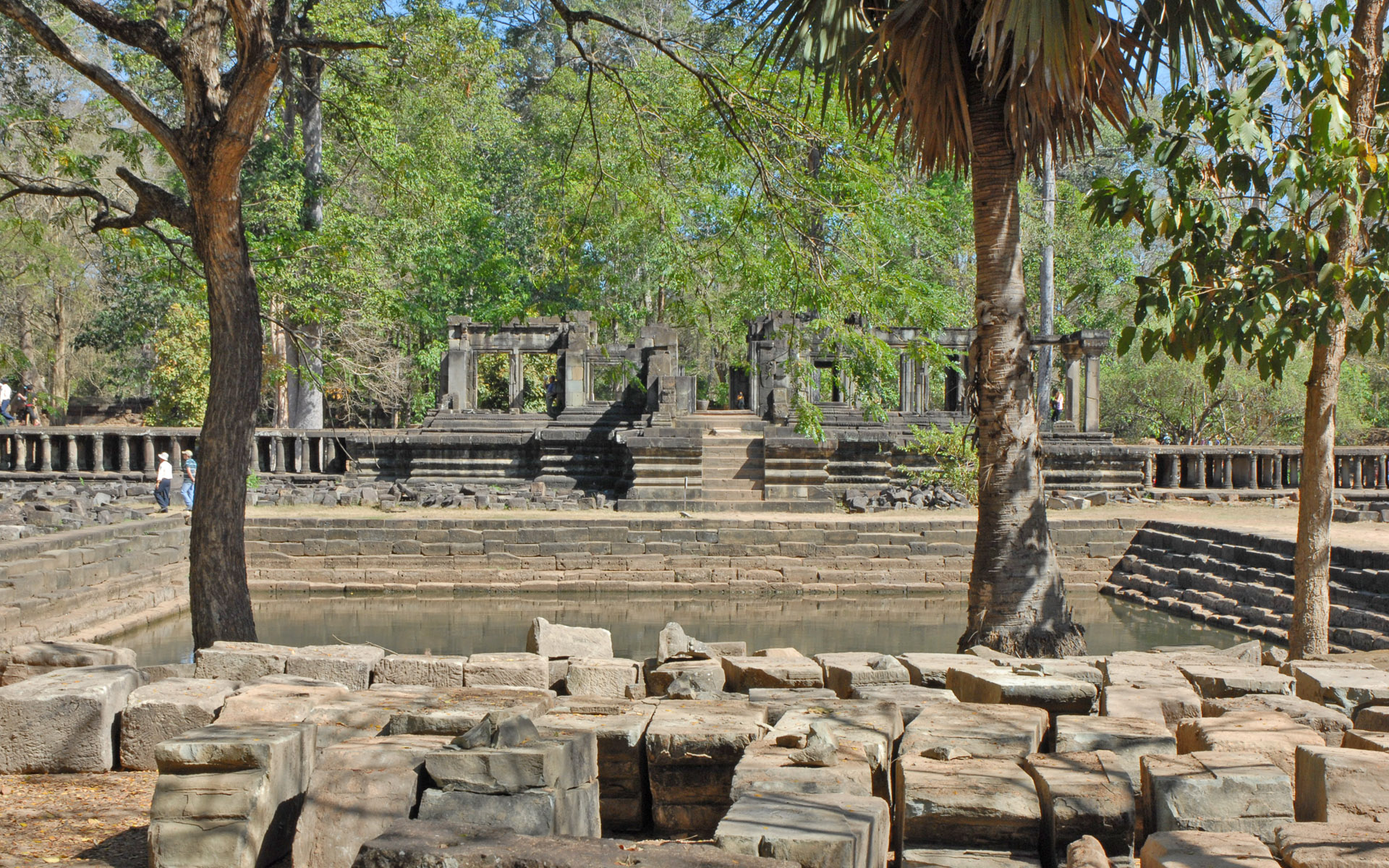

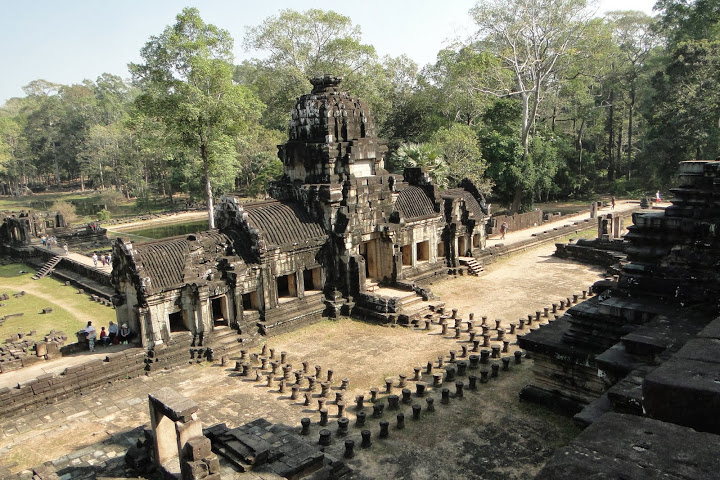

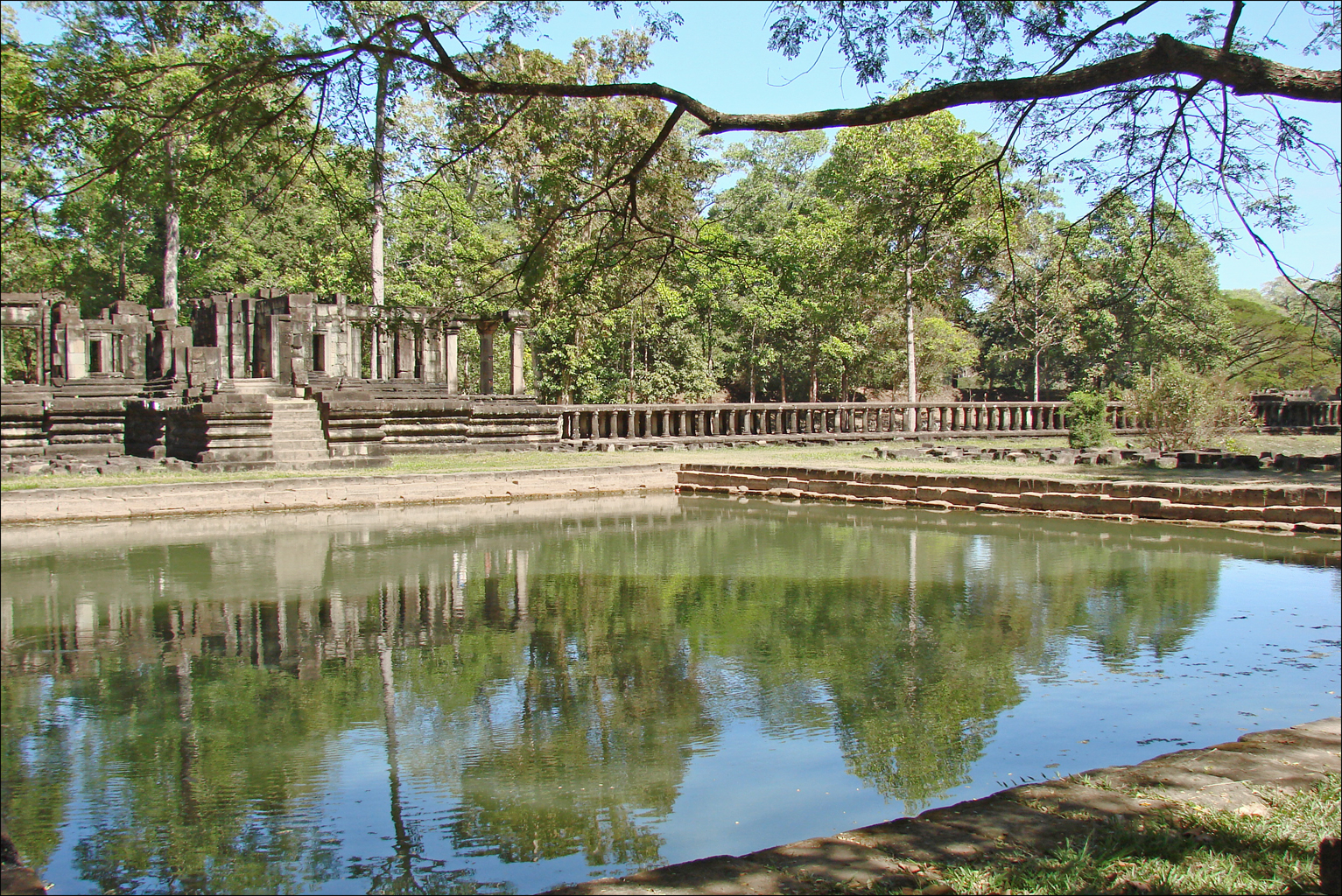

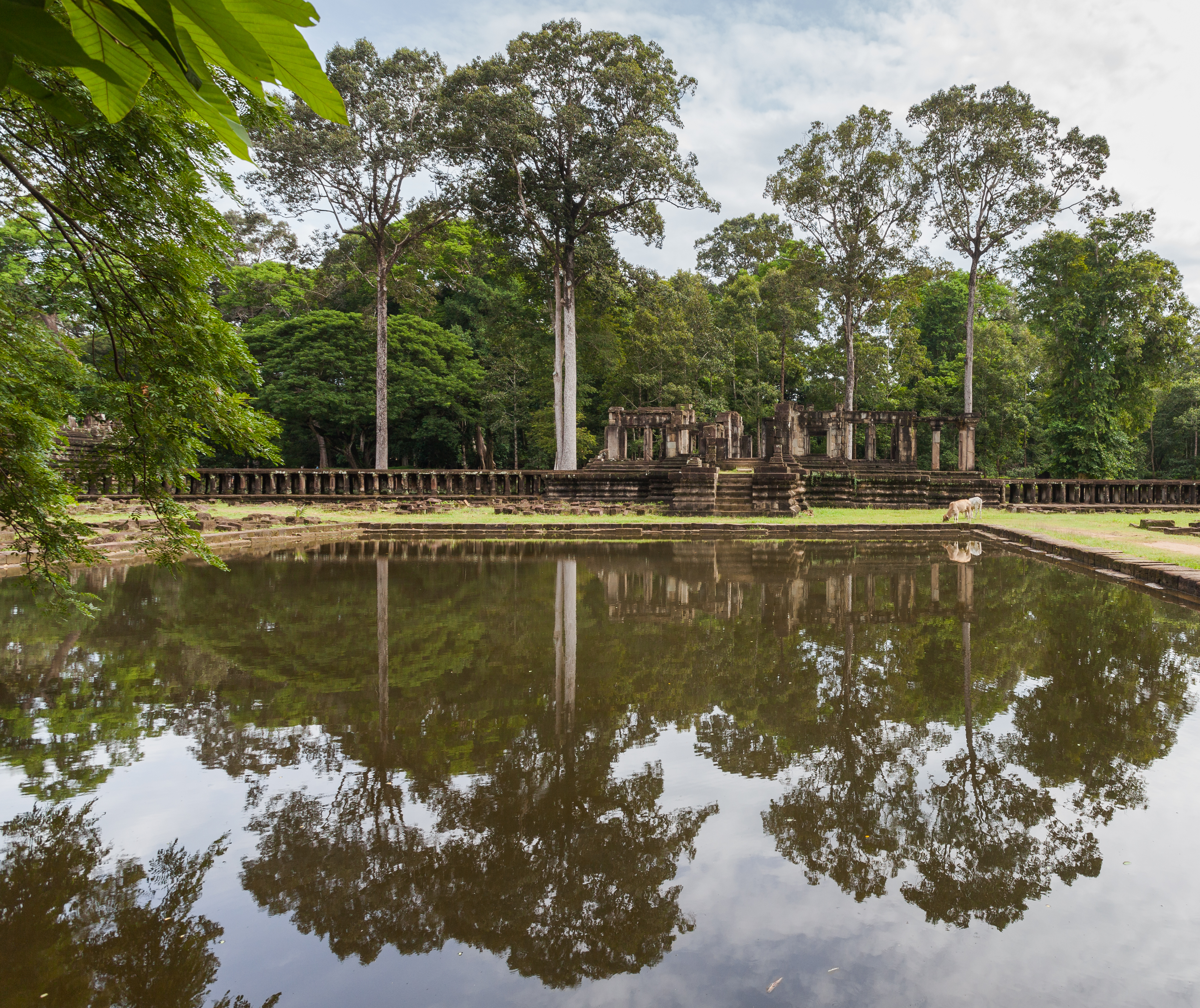

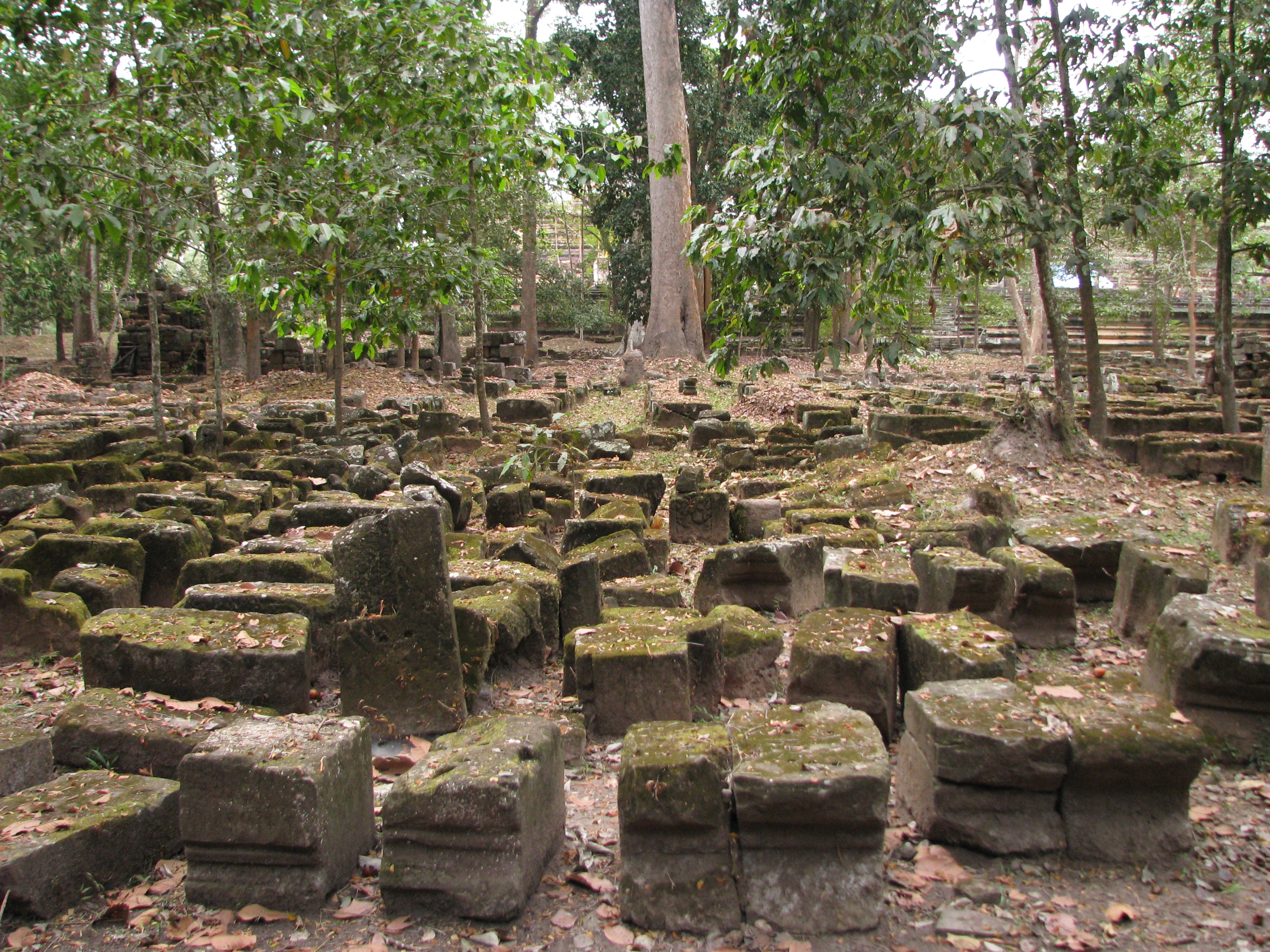

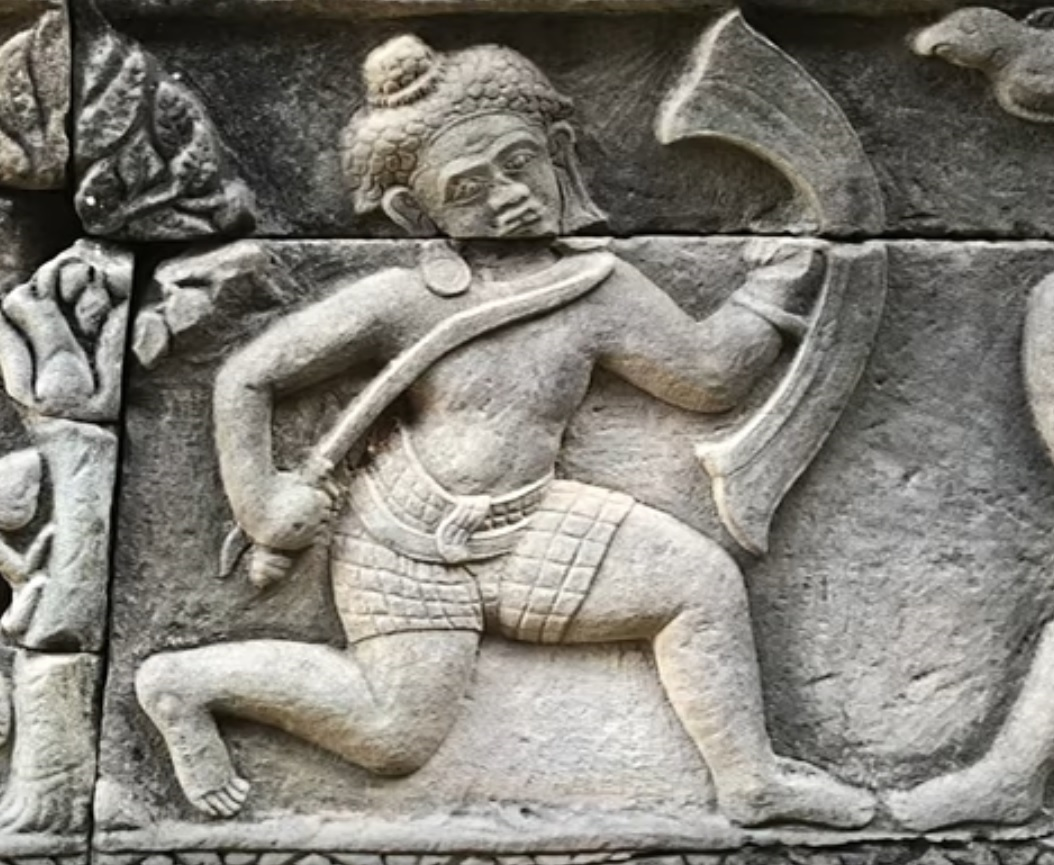
Bas-relief of soldier carrying a kukri and shield.

== See also ==
- Sangrama
