= Udayadityavarman II =

Udayadityavarman II ឧទ័យាទិត្យវរ្ម័នទី២
- King
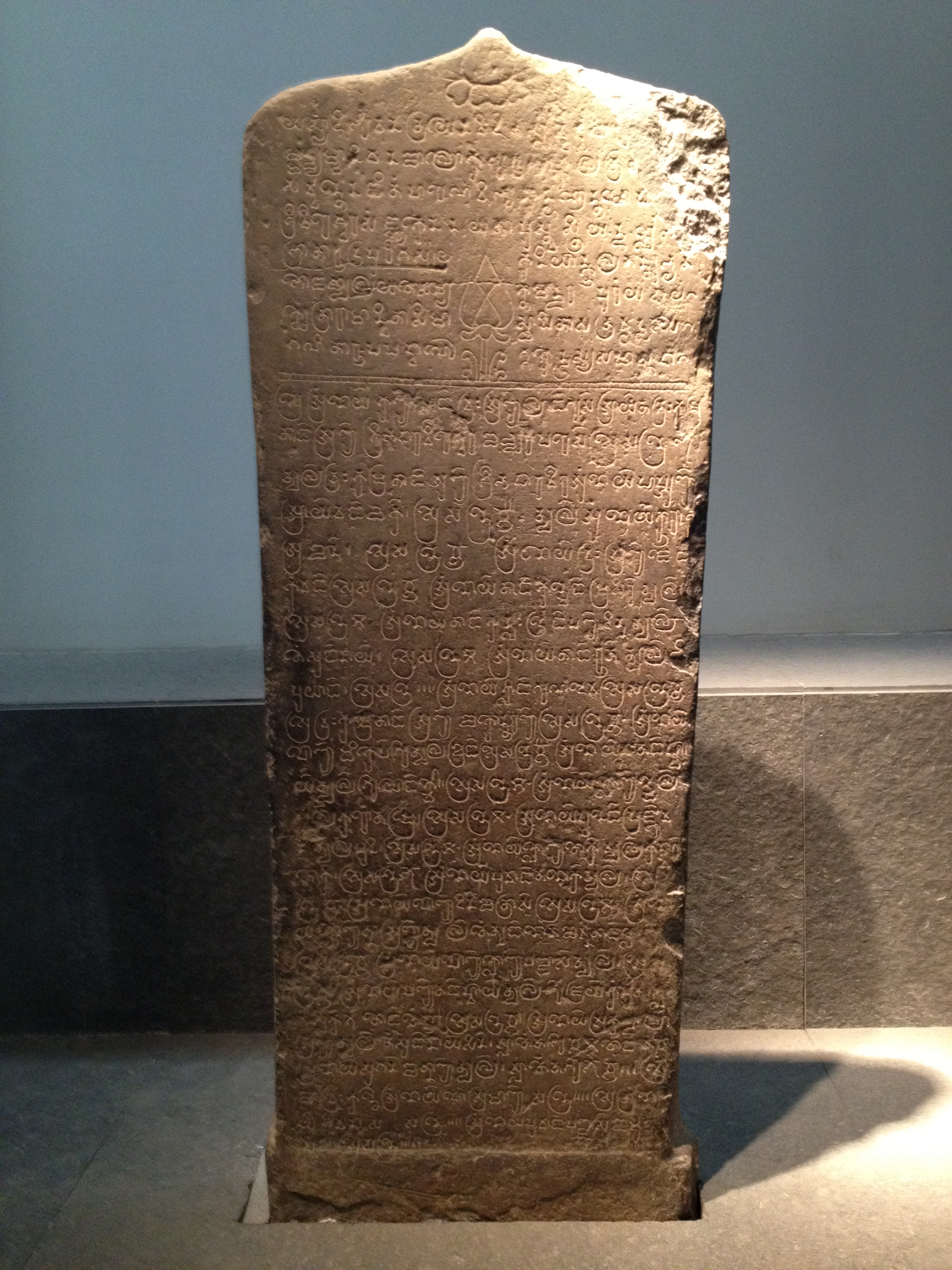
- Stela erected by Udayadityavarman II to mark tax-exempted regions in the Mekong Delta. Found in My Qui, Long An province, Vietnam.
- Reign: 1050–1066
- Predecessor: Suryavarman I
- Successor: Harshavarman III
- Died: 1066
- Issue: Nripatindravarman; Vijayendralakshmi
Names
- Bhuvanaditya
- Father: Yasovarman I

Udayadityavarman II (Khmer: ឧទ័យាទិត្យវរ្ម័នទី២) ruled the Angkor Kingdom from 1050 to 1066 A.D. He was the successor of Suryavarman I but not his son; he descended from Yasovarman I's spouse.

He built the Baphuon Temple to honor the god Shiva, but some of the sculptures are dedicated to Buddha. He also completed the construction of the West Baray reservoir and built the West Mebon, a raised-earth island in the center.

The Sdok Kak Thom temple, located near the present day Thai town of Aranyaprathet, was also constructed during his reign. The temple was home to a gray sandstone stele, 1.51 meters high, with a detailed inscription that recounted the sequence of previous Khmer kings. The inscription stele is now part of the collection of the national museum in Bangkok.

During his reign, several attempted rebellions, in 1051 and 1065, were crushed by his general Sangrama.

He was succeeded by his younger brother Harshavarman III.

Regnal titles
| Preceded by Suryavarman I | Emperor of Angkor; 1050–1066 | Succeeded by Harshavarman III |
