= Dharanindravarman I =

- King of Cambodia
- Reign: 1107–1113
- Predecessor: Jayavarman VI
- Successor: Suryavarman II
- Died: 1113

Dharanindravarman I (Khmer: ធរណីន្ទ្រវរ្ម័នទី១) was a king of the Khmer Empire, reigning from 1107 AD to 1113 AD. He ascended to the throne following the death of his younger brother, Jayavarman VI. He was married to Queen Vijayendralakshmi, former wife of Jayavarman VI. He was murdered in battle by his great-nephew, Suryavarman II. The event is supported by the Ban That inscription.

Regnal titles
Preceded by Jayavarman VI	Emperor of Angkor; 1107–1113	Succeeded by Suryavarman II
