= Yaśodharapura =

Second capital of the Khmer Empire

Yashodharapura
- យសោធរបុរៈ (Khmer)
- Angkor
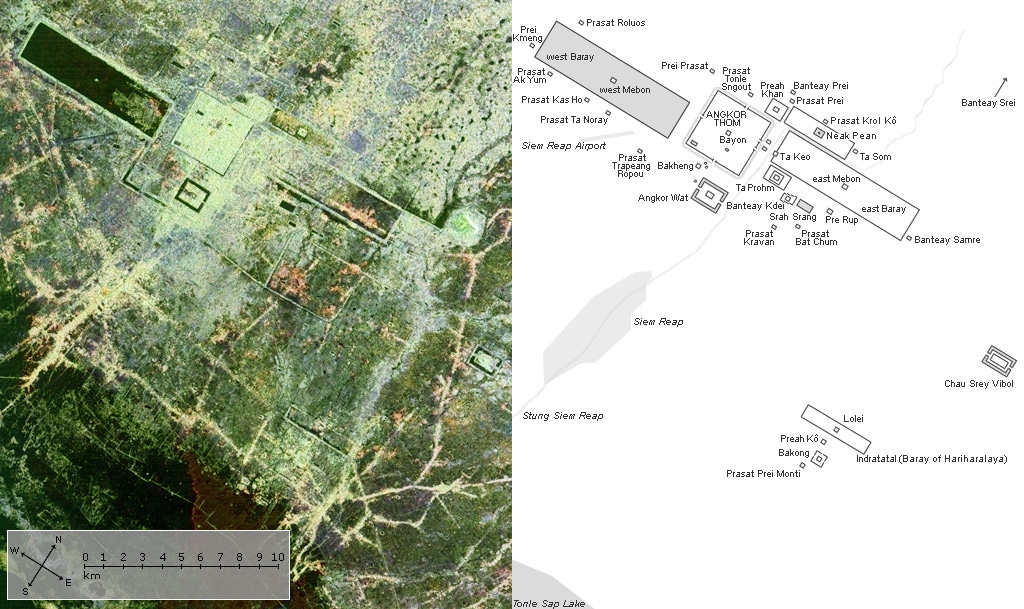
- Satellite image and map of Yashodharapura

- Location in Cambodia
- 13°24′45″N 103°52′0″E
- Type: Archaeological site
- Periods: Post-classical
- Cultures: Khmer culture
- Satellite of: Cambodia
- Associated with: Khmer people
- Location: Siem Reap, Cambodia
- Region: Southeast Asia
- Part of: Angkor

History
- Built: late 9th century AD
- Built by: Yasovarman I
- Abandoned: 1431 AD
- Event: Khmer Empire

Site notes
- Material: Laterite and Sandstone
- Architectural styles: Bakheng, Pre Rup, Banteay Srei, Khleang, Baphuon, Angkor Wat, Bayon and post Bayon
- Archaeologists: Cambodia
- Discovered: 1860 AD
- Condition: Restored and ruined
- Owner: Khmer Empire
- Public access: Yes

Yashodharapura (Khmer: យសោធរបុរៈ, Yeăsaotheăreăbŏră; Khmer pronunciation: [jeaʔ sao tʰeaʔ reaʔ boʔ raʔ]; Sanskrit: यशोधरपुर "Yashodharapura"), also known as Angkor (Khmer: អង្គរ), was the capital of the Khmer Empire for most of its history. It was established by King Yashovarman I in the late 9th century and centred on the temple of Phnom Bakheng.

Yashodharapura was referred to in the inscriptions as Phnom Kandal (Central Mountain). Phnom Bakheng was constructed just before the foundation of Yashodharapura due to Yashovarman's belief that the mountain was among the holiest of places to worship the Hindu deities. Yashodharapura was linked to an earlier capital, Hariharalaya, by a causeway. The urban complex included the East Baray or Yashodharatataka.

The succeeding capitals built in the area were called Yashodharapura. One of those is Angkor Thom, centred on the Bayon temple by King Jayavarman VII (1181-1218AD).

In 1352, King U Thong (also known as Ramathibodi I of the Ayutthaya Kingdom) laid siege to it. The Ayutthaya were successful the next year in capturing the city, placing one of their princes on the throne. In 1357, the Khmer regained it. Angkor Thom was raided and abandoned in the 15th century by King Borommarachathirat II of Ayutthaya.
