= Bayon =

Khmer temple in Angkor Thom, Cambodia

- Jayagiri (Chey Kiri)
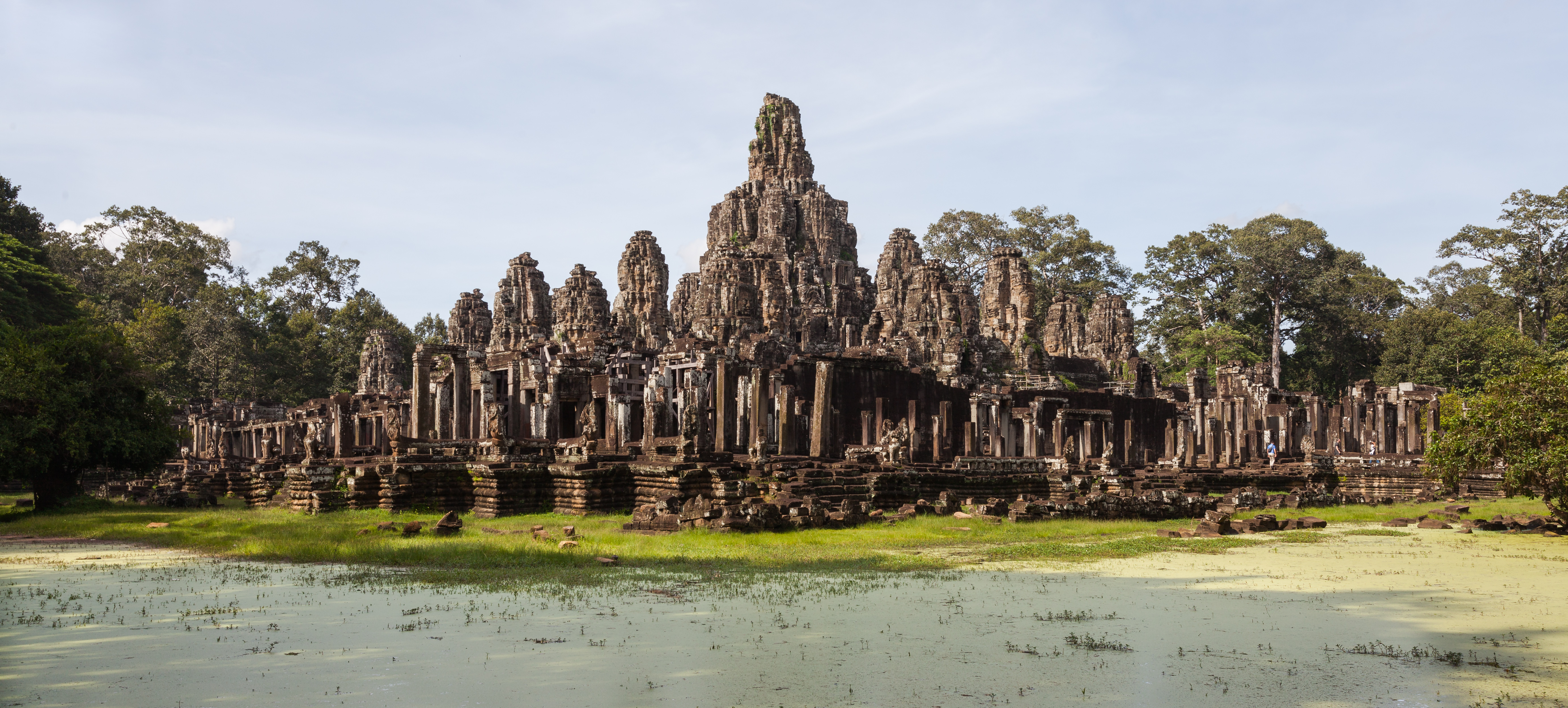

- Location in Cambodia

Religion
- Affiliation: Buddhism
- Sect: Theravada
- Deity: Avalokiteshvara, Hevajra (Jayagiri)

Location
- Location: Angkor Thom
- Country: Cambodia
- Coordinates: 13°26′28″N 103°51′31″E

Architecture
- Type: Bayon
- Creator: Jayavarman VII
- Completed: End of the 12th century CE

The Bayon (Khmer: ប្រាសាទបាយ័ន, Prasat Bayoăn [praːsaːt baːjŏən]; /ˈbaɪɔːn/ BAI-on) is a richly decorated Theravada Buddhist temple of the Khmer Empire located at Angkor in Cambodia. Built in the late 12th or early 13th century as the state temple of King Jayavarman VII (Khmer: ព្រះបាទជ័យវរ្ម័នទី ៧), it stands at the centre of Jayavarman's capital city, Angkor Thom (Khmer: អង្គរធំ). The Bayon reflects the strong Buddhist orientation of Jayavarman VII's reign. Originally conceived as a Mahayana Buddhist monument centered on the cult of the Bodhisattva of compassion, the temple later adapted to the spread of Theravada Buddhism in Cambodia. Its iconography, spatial organization, and emphasis on compassion and kingship illustrate the close relationship between Buddhism and royal authority at Angkor, while its continued use as a Buddhist sanctuary demonstrates the enduring influence of Buddhism in the region.

The temple is best known for its many towers adorned with serene, smiling stone faces carved on all sides, which are commonly interpreted as representations of King Jayavarman VII and symbolize compassion and royal authority. The Bayon also features extensive bas-reliefs depicting historical events, religious themes, and scenes of everyday life in the Khmer Empire, making it one of the most important visual sources for the study of Angkorian society. The Japanese Government Team for the Safeguarding of Angkor (JSA) has described the Bayon as "the most striking expression of the baroque style" of Khmer architecture, in contrast to the classical style of Angkor Wat (Khmer: ប្រាសាទអង្គរវត្ត).

== Etymology ==
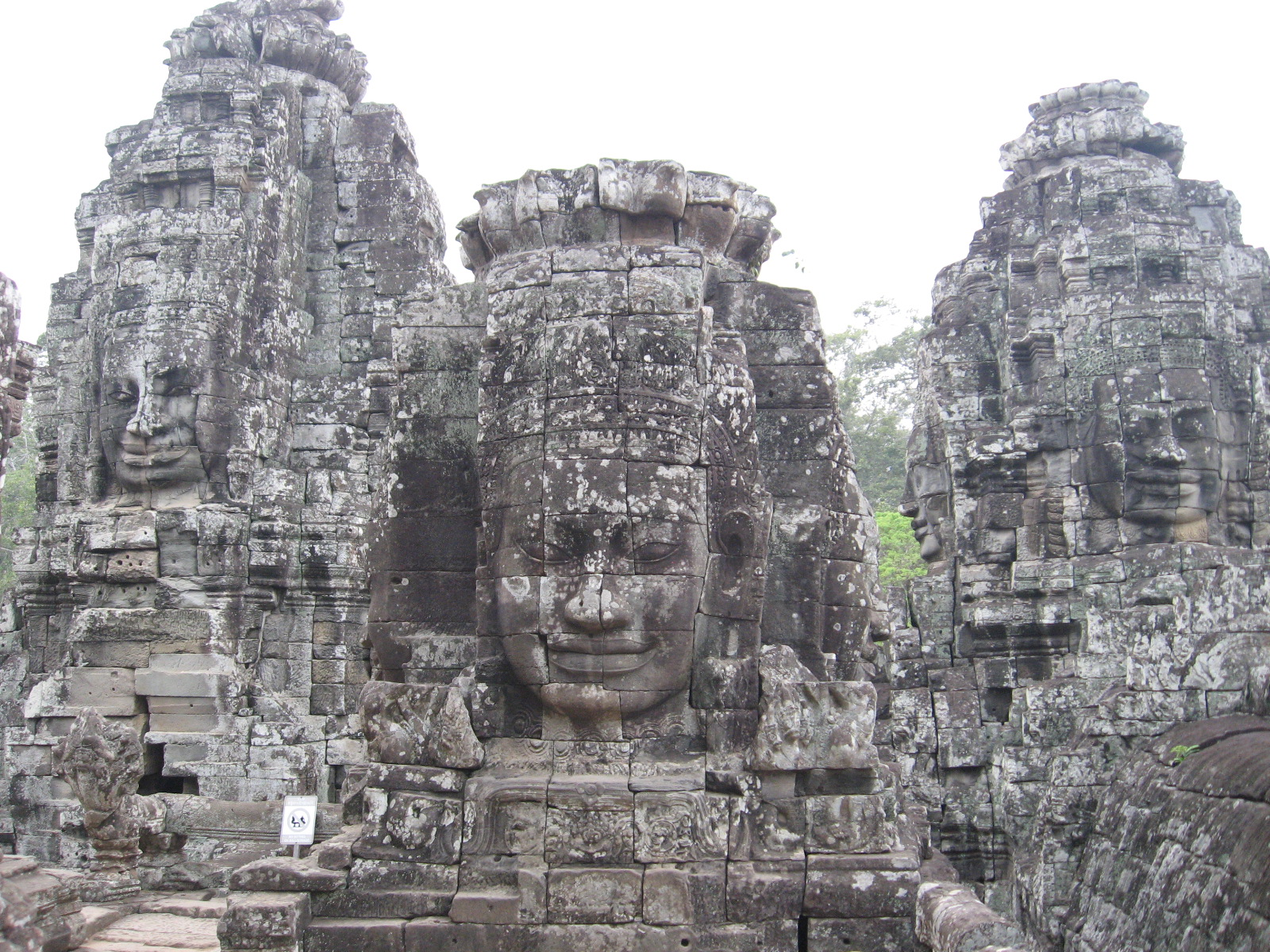
Carved faces on a tower at the Bayon

The original name for the Bayon is Jayagiri (Khmer: ជ័យគីរី, Chey Kĭri) (or "Victory Mountain" or "Mountain of Brahma"; "Jaya" - another name of Brahma and "giri" to mountain), with Sanskrit roots similar to Sīnhāgiri ("Lion Rock").

The name of Bayon was given by Etienne Aymonier in 1880. According to his report, Bayon was the Latin transliteration of what he had seen written in Khmer as "Bayânt" which he presumed must have been a corrupted form of the Pali Vejayant or Sanskrit Vaijayant, the name of the celestial palace of Indra of which the Bayon was presumed to be the earthly reflection. The first syllable Ba as a Sanskritic prefix was similar to that found in other places such as Ba Phnom and could signify the presence of a protector or defensor.

== History ==
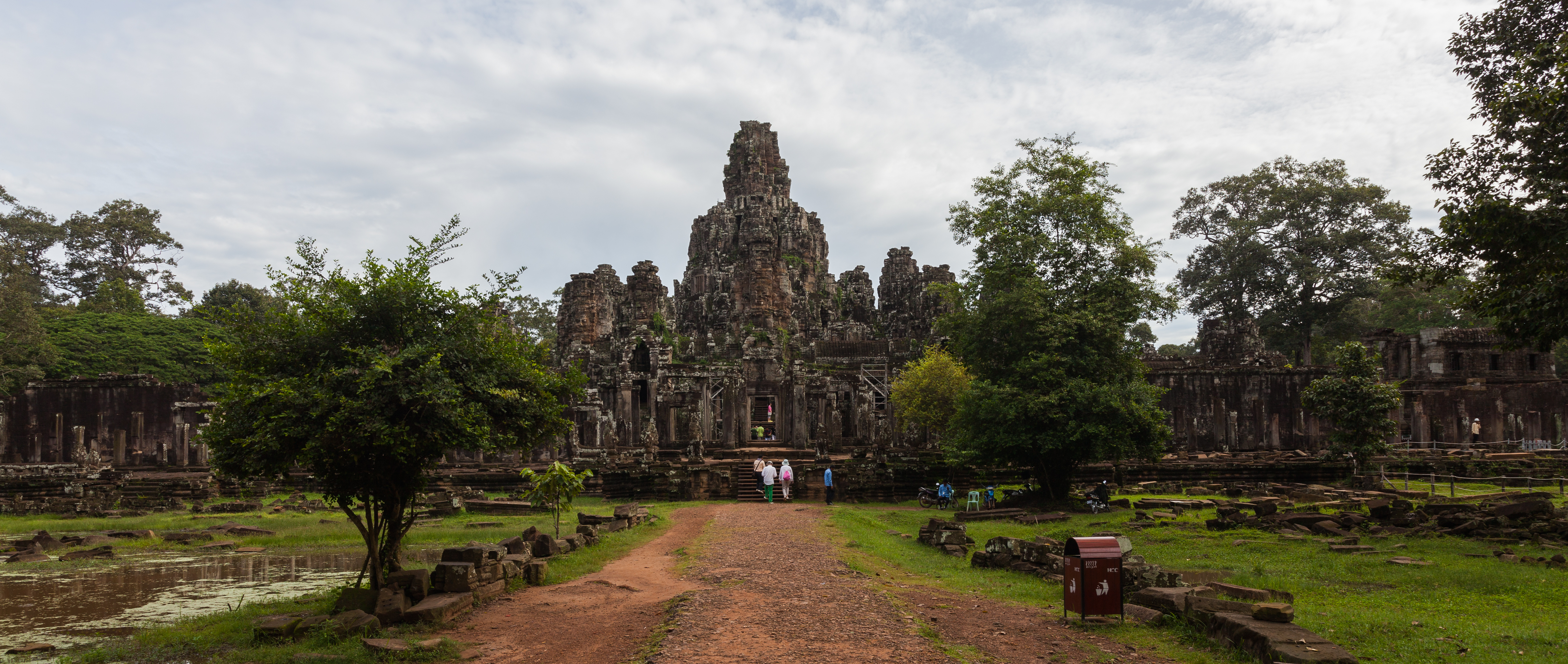
According to Angkor-scholar Maurice Glaize, the Bayon appears "as but a muddle of stones, a sort of moving chaos assaulting the sky."

=== Buddhist symbolism in the foundation of the temple by King Jayavarman VII ===
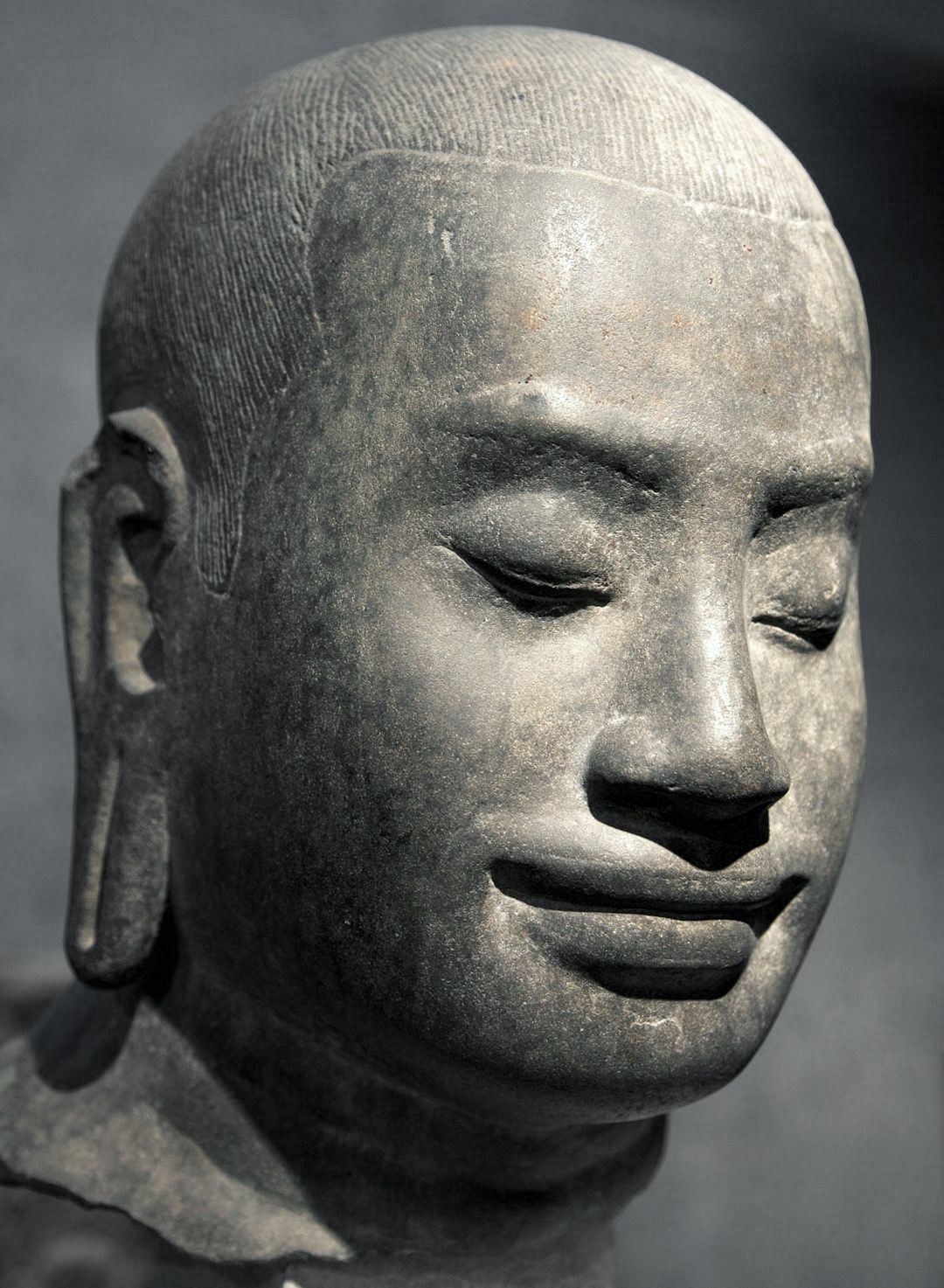
According to scholars, King Jayavarman VII bears a strong resemblance to the face towers of the Bayon.

The Bayon was the last state temple to be built at Angkor, and the only Angkorian state temple to be built primarily to worship Buddhist deities, though a great number of minor and local deities were also encompassed as representatives of the various districts and cities of the realm. Originally a Hindu temple, the Bayon (Jayagiri) was the centrepiece of Jayavarman VII's massive program of monumental construction and public works, which was also responsible for the walls and nāga-bridges of Angkor Thom and the temples of Vishnu, Ta Prohm and Banteay Kdei.

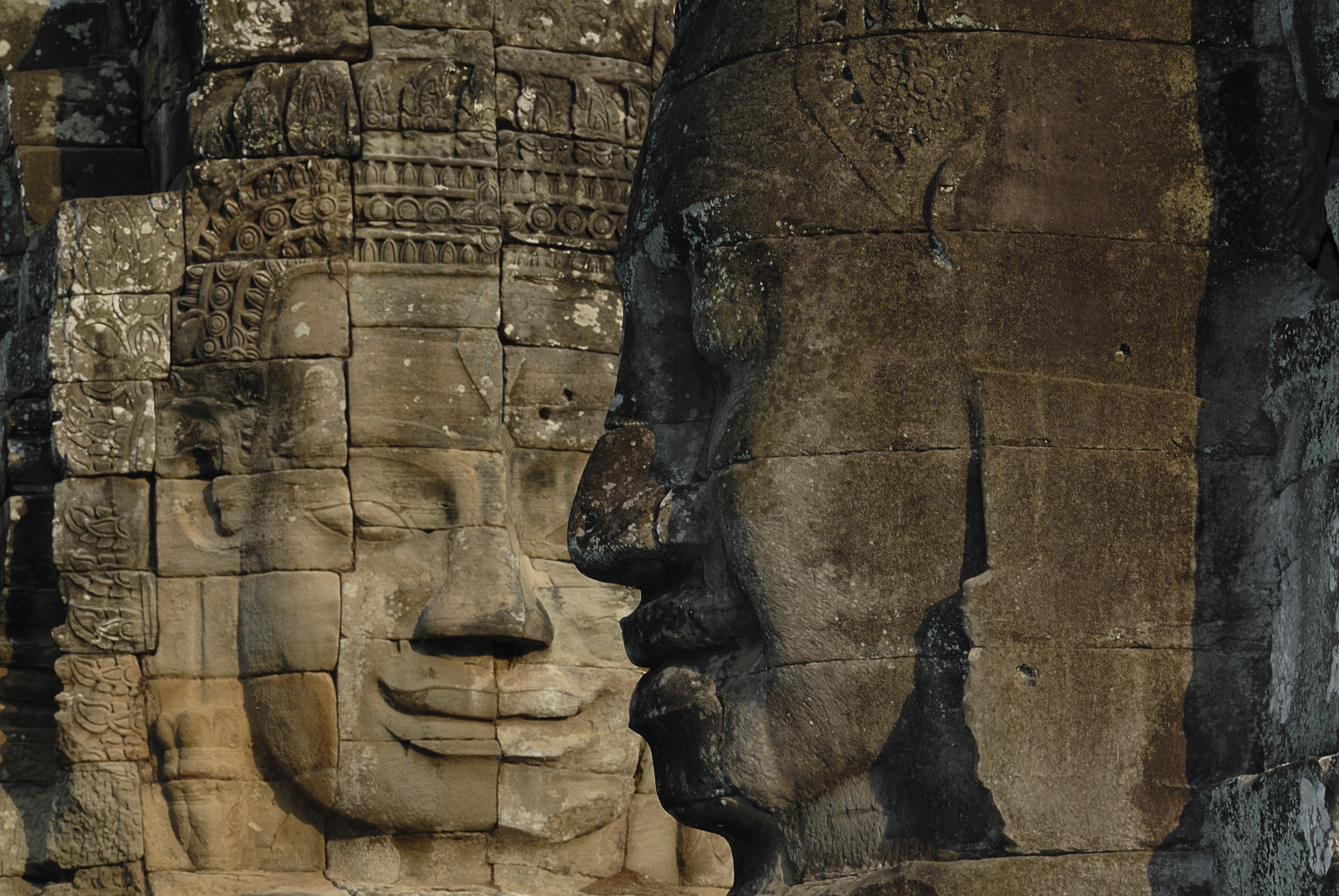
From the vantage point of the temple's upper terrace, one is struck by "the serenity of the stone faces" occupying many towers.

The similarity of the 216 gigantic faces on the temple's towers to other statues of the has led many scholars to the conclusion that the faces are representations of Jayavarman VII, himself. Scholars have theorized that the faces belong to Avalokitesvara, the bodhisattva of compassion. But some locals believe the temple was built for Brahma, since the faces have four sides, representing Brahma's four faces. Also, the faces have three eyes, which symbolizes Shiva in the Trimurti. Buddha's images seldom wear jewelry like necklaces, large earrings and a crown. The two hypotheses need not be regarded as mutually exclusive. Angkor scholar George Coedès has theorized that Jayavarman VII stood squarely in the tradition of the Khmer monarchs in thinking of himself as a devaraja (god-king), the difference being that while his predecessors were Hindus and associated themselves with Brahma and his symbol the, chaturmukha (four faces), Jayavarman VII was a Buddhist.

=== Alterations following the death of Jayavarman VII ===
Since the time of Jayavarman VII, the Bayon has undergone numerous Buddhist additions and alterations at the hands of subsequent monarchs. During the reign of Jayavarman VIII in the mid-13th century, the Khmer empire reverted to Hinduism and its state temple was altered accordingly. In later centuries, Theravada Buddhism became the dominant religion, leading to still further changes, before the temple was eventually abandoned to the jungle. Current features which were not part of the original plan include the terrace to the east of the temple, the libraries, the square corners of the inner gallery, and parts of the upper terrace.

=== Modern restoration ===
In the first part of the 20th century, the École Française d'Extrême Orient took the lead in the conservation of the temple, restoring it in accordance with the technique of anastylosis. Since 1995 the Japanese Government team for the Safeguarding of Angkor (the JSA) has been the main conservation body, and has held annual symposia.

== The site ==
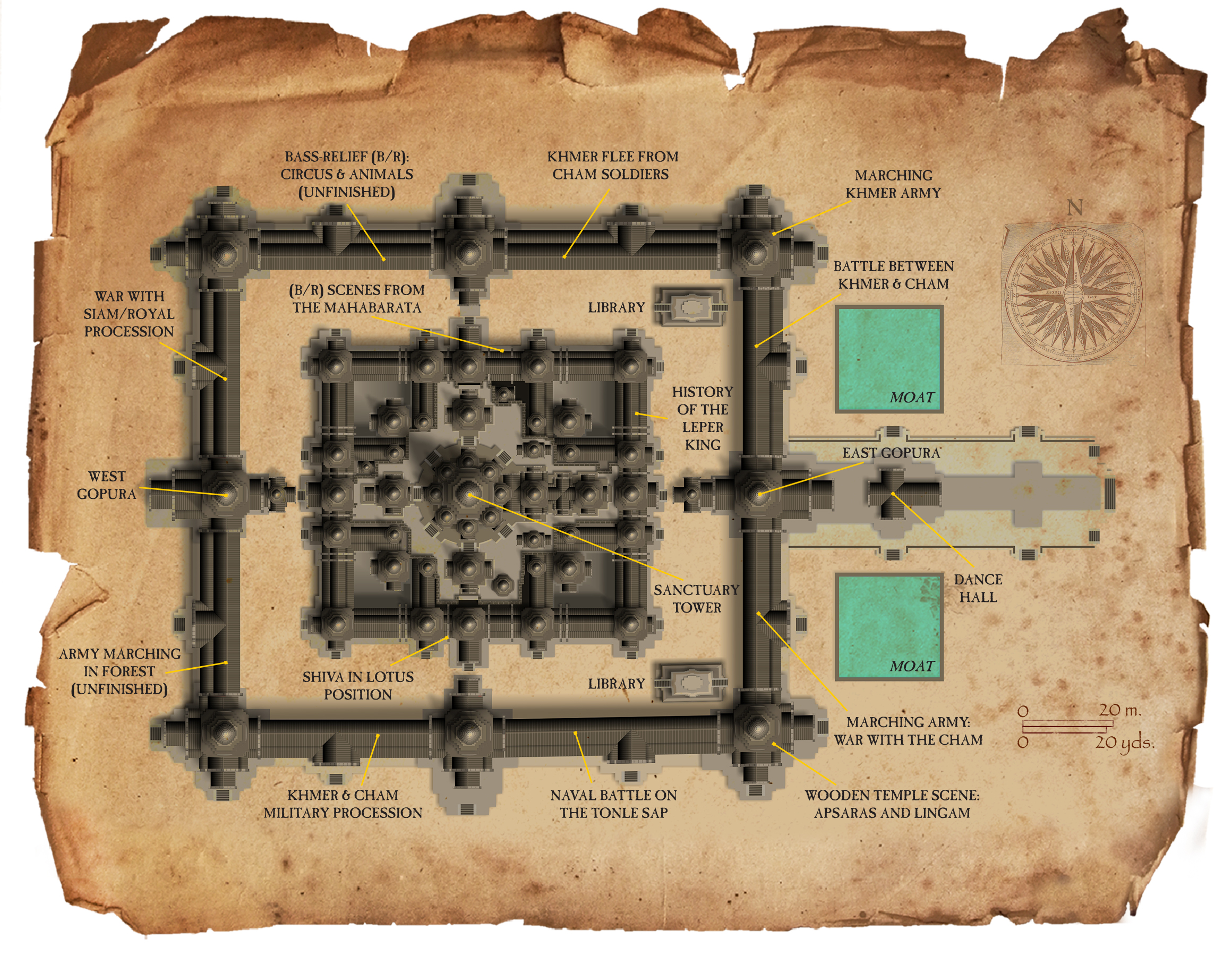
The Bayon in plan, showing the main structure. The dimensions of the upper terrace are only approximate, due to its irregular shape.

The temple is oriented towards the east, and so its buildings are set back to the west inside enclosures elongated along the east-west axis. Because the temple sits at the exact centre of Angkor Thom, roads lead to it directly from the gates at each of the city's cardinal points. The temple itself has no wall or moats, these being replaced by those of the city itself: the city-temple arrangement, with an area of 9 square kilometres, is much larger than that of Angkor Wat to the south (2 km²). Within the temple itself, there are two galleried enclosures (the third and second enclosures) and an upper terrace (the first enclosure). All of these elements are crowded against each other with little space between. Unlike Angkor Wat, which impresses with the grand scale of its architecture and open spaces, the Bayon "gives the impression of being compressed within a frame which is too tight for it."

=== The outer gallery: historical events and everyday life ===
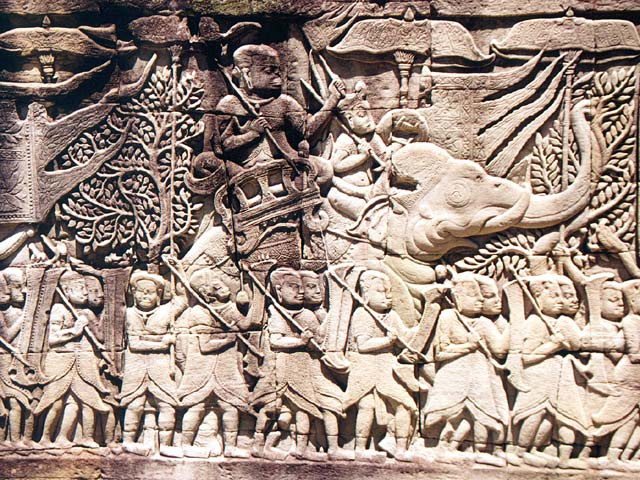
A scene from the eastern gallery shows a Khmer army on the march.

The outer wall of the outer gallery features a series of bas-reliefs depicting historical events and scenes from the everyday life of the Angkorian Khmer. Though highly detailed and informative in themselves, the bas-reliefs are not accompanied by any sort of epigraphic text, and for that reason considerable uncertainty remains as to which historical events are portrayed and how, if at all, the different reliefs are related. From the east gopura clockwise, the subjects are:

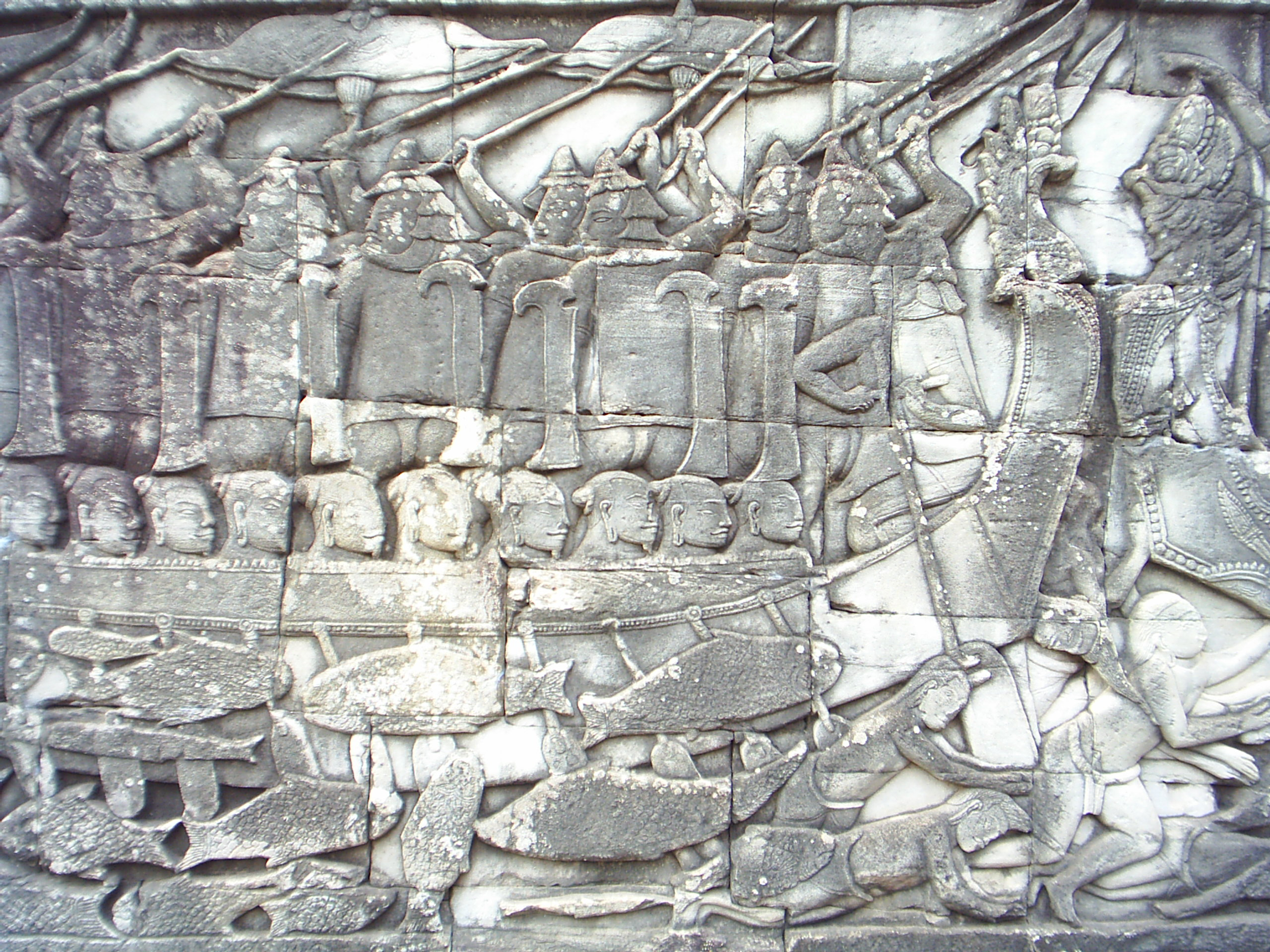
A scene from the southern gallery depicts a naval battle; this section shows Cham warriors in a boat and dead Khmer fighters in the water.

- in the southern part of the eastern gallery a marching Khmer army (including some Chinese soldiers), with musicians, horsemen, and officers mounted on elephants, followed by wagons of provisions;
- still in the eastern gallery, on the other side of the doorway leading into the courtyard, another procession followed by domestic scenes depicting Angkorian houses, some of the occupants of which appear to be Chinese merchants;
- in the southeast corner pavilion, an unfinished temple scene with towers, apsaras (Khmer: អប្សរា), and a lingam (Khmer: លិង្គសិវៈ);

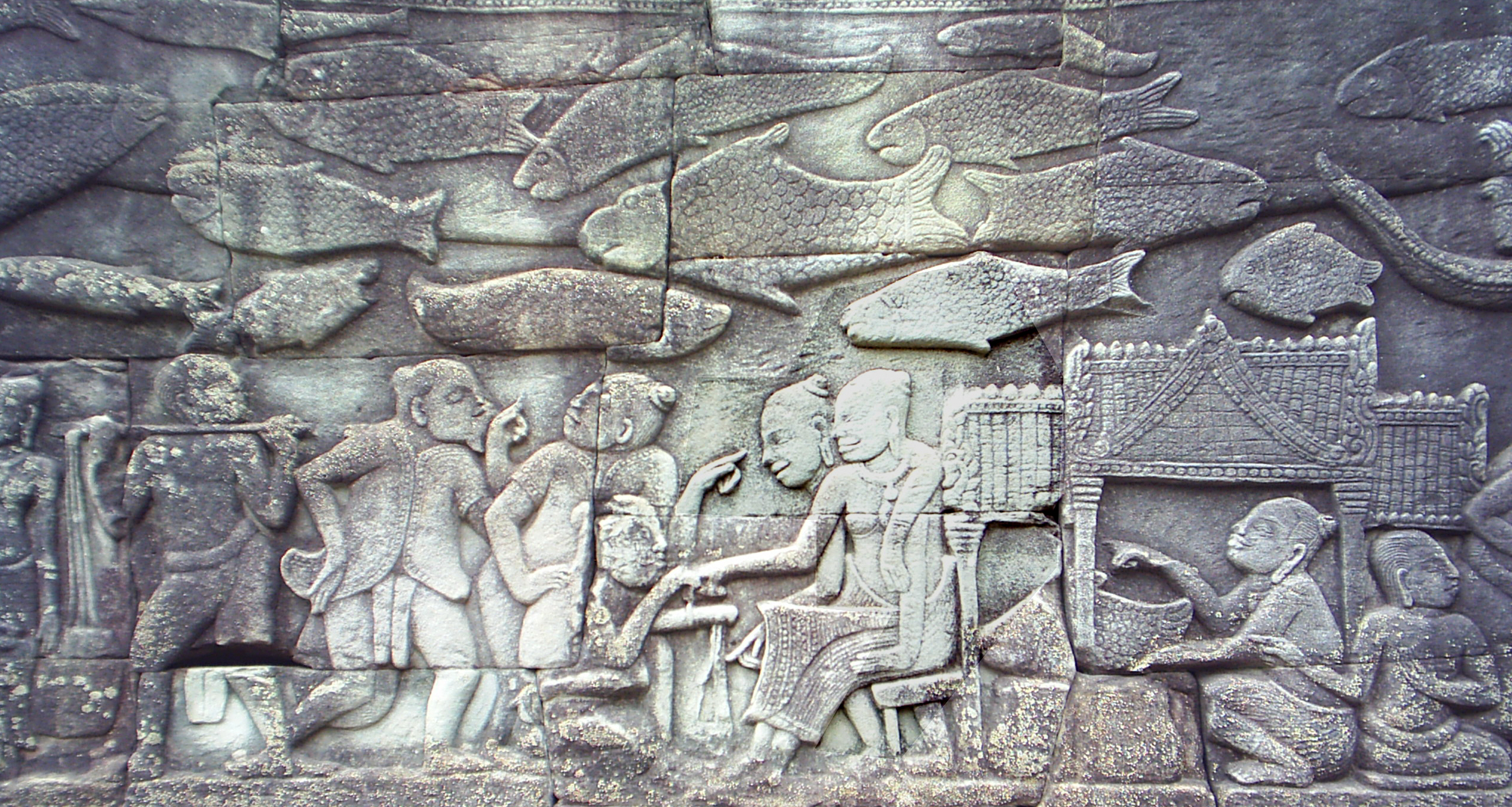
A market scene in the southern gallery shows the weighing of goods; the fish belong to a naval battle taking place above.

- in the eastern part of the southern gallery, a naval battle on the Tonle Sap (Khmer: ទន្លេសាប) between Khmer and Cham forces, underneath which are more scenes from civilian life depicting a market, open-air cooking, hunters, and women tending to children and an invalid;
- still in the southern gallery, past the doorway leading to the courtyard, a scene with boats and fisherman, including a Chinese junk, below which is a depiction of a cockfight; then some palace scenes with princesses, servants, people engaged in conversations and games, wrestlers, and a wild boar fight; then a battle scene with Cham warriors disembarking from boats and engaging Khmer warriors whose bodies are protected by coiled ropes, followed by a scene in which the Khmer dominate the combat, followed by a scene in which the Khmer king celebrates a victory feast with his subjects;
- in the western part of the southern gallery, a military procession including both Khmers and Chams, elephants, war machines such as a large crossbow and a catapult;
- in the southern part of the western gallery, unfinished reliefs show an army marching through the forest, then arguments and fighting between groups of Khmers;
- in the western gallery, past the doorway to the courtyard, a scene depicting a melee between Khmer warriors, then a scene in which warriors pursue others past a pool in which an enormous fish swallows a small deer; then a royal procession, with the king standing on an elephant, preceded by the ark of the sacred flame;
- in the western part of the northern gallery, again unfinished, a scene of royal entertainment including athletes, jugglers and acrobats, a procession of animals, ascetics sitting in a forest, and more battles between Khmer and Cham forces;
- in the northern gallery, past the doorway to the courtyard, a scene in which the Khmer flee from Cham soldiers advancing in tight ranks;
- in the northeast corner pavilion, another marching Khmer army;
- in the eastern gallery, a land battle between Khmer and Cham forces, both of which are supported by elephants: the Khmer appear to be winning.

The outer gallery encloses a courtyard in which there are two libraries (one on either side of the east entrance). Originally the courtyard contained 16 chapels, but these were subsequently demolished by the Hindu restorationist Jayavarman VIII.

=== The inner gallery: depictions of mythological events ===
The inner gallery is raised above ground level and has doubled corners, with the original redented cross-shape later filled out to a square. Its bas-reliefs, later additions of Jayavarman VIII, are in stark contrast to those of the outer: rather than set-piece battles and processions, the smaller canvases offered by the inner gallery are decorated for the most part with scenes from Hindu mythology. Some of the figures depicted are Siva, Vishnu, and Brahma, the members of the trimurti or threefold godhead of Hinduism, Apsaras or celestial dancers, Ravana and Garuda. There is however no certainty as to what some of the panels depict, or as to their relationship with one another. One gallery just north of the eastern gopura, for example, shows two linked scenes which have been explained as the freeing of a goddess from inside a mountain, or as an act of iconoclasm by Cham invaders. Another series of panels shows a king fighting a gigantic serpent with his bare hands, then having his hands examined by women, and finally lying ill in bed; these images have been connected with the legend of the Leper King, who contracted leprosy from the venom of a serpent with whom he had done battle. Less obscure are depictions of the construction of a Vishnuite temple (south of the western gopura) and the Churning of the Sea of Milk (north of the western gopura).

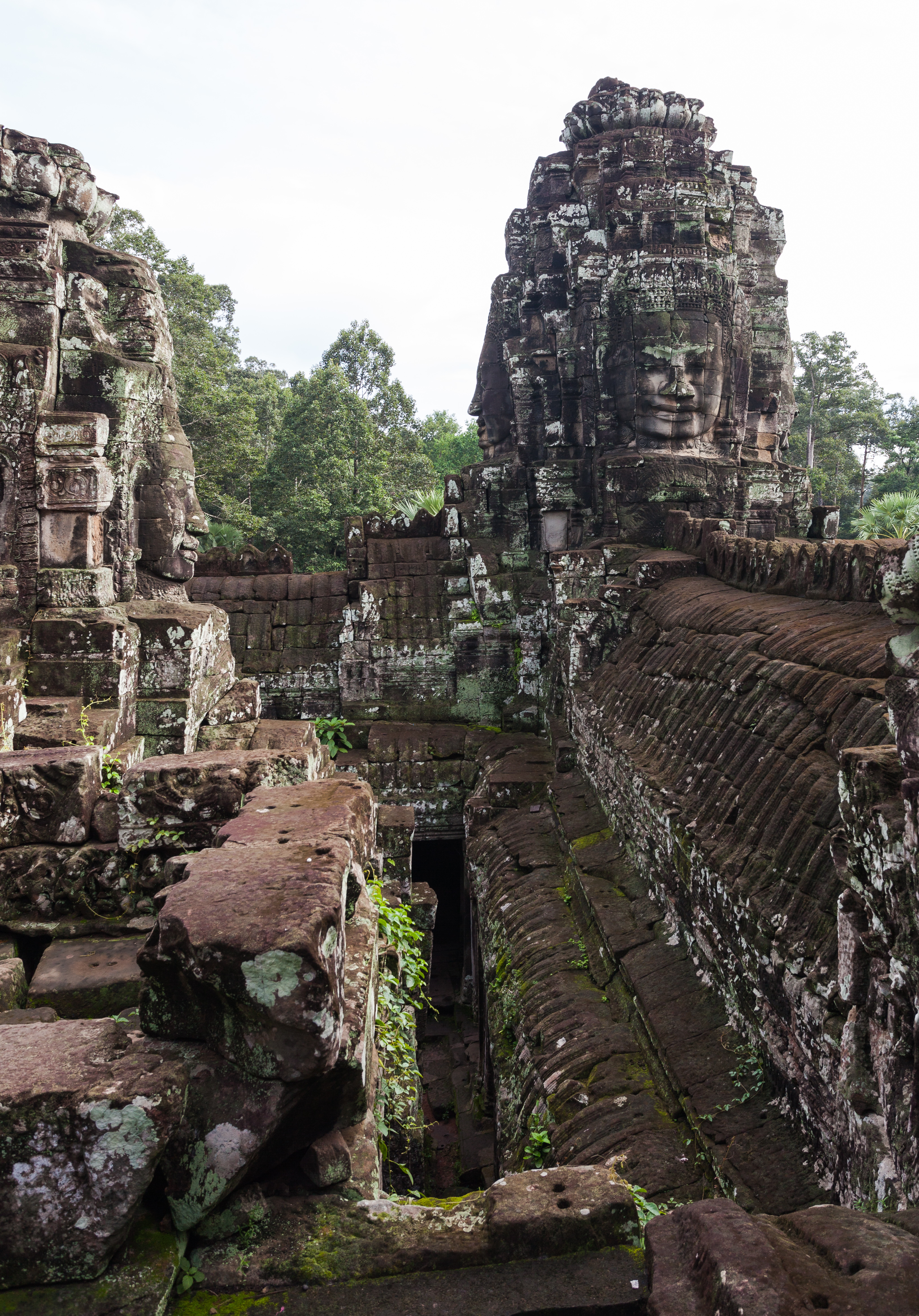
Very little space is left between the inner gallery (left) and the upper terrace (right)

=== The upper terrace: 200 faces of Lokesvara ===
The inner gallery is nearly filled by the upper terrace, raised one level higher again. The lack of space between the inner gallery and the upper terrace has led scholars to conclude that the upper terrace did not figure in the original plan for the temple, but that it was added shortly thereafter following a change in design. Originally, it is believed, the Bayon had been designed as a single-level structure, similar in that respect to the roughly contemporaneous foundations at Ta Prohm and Banteay Kdei.

The upper terrace is home to the famous "face towers" of the Bayon, each of which supports two, three or (most commonly) four gigantic smiling faces. In addition to the mass of the central tower, smaller towers are located along the inner gallery (at the corners and entrances), and on chapels on the upper terrace. "Wherever one wanders," writes Maurice Glaize, "the faces of Lokesvara follow and dominate with their multiple presence."

Efforts to read some significance into the numbers of towers and faces have run up against the circumstance that these numbers have not remained constant over time, as towers have been added through construction and lost to attrition. At one point, the temple was host to 49 such towers; now only 37 remain. The number of faces is approximately 200, but since some are only partially preserved there can be no definitive count.

=== The central tower and sanctuary ===
Like the inner gallery, the central tower was originally cruciform but was later filled out and made circular. It rises 43 metres above the ground. At the time of the temple's foundation, the principal religious image was a statue of the Buddha, 3.6 m tall, located in the sanctuary at the heart of the central tower. The statue depicted the Buddha seated in meditation, shielded from the elements by the flared hood of the serpent king Mucalinda. During the reign of Hindu restorationist monarch Jayavarman VIII(Khmer: ព្រះបាទជ័យវរ្ម័នទី ៨), the figure was removed from the sanctuary and smashed to pieces. After being recovered in 1933 from the bottom of a well, it was pieced back together, and is now on display in a small pavilion at Angkor.

== Gallery ==
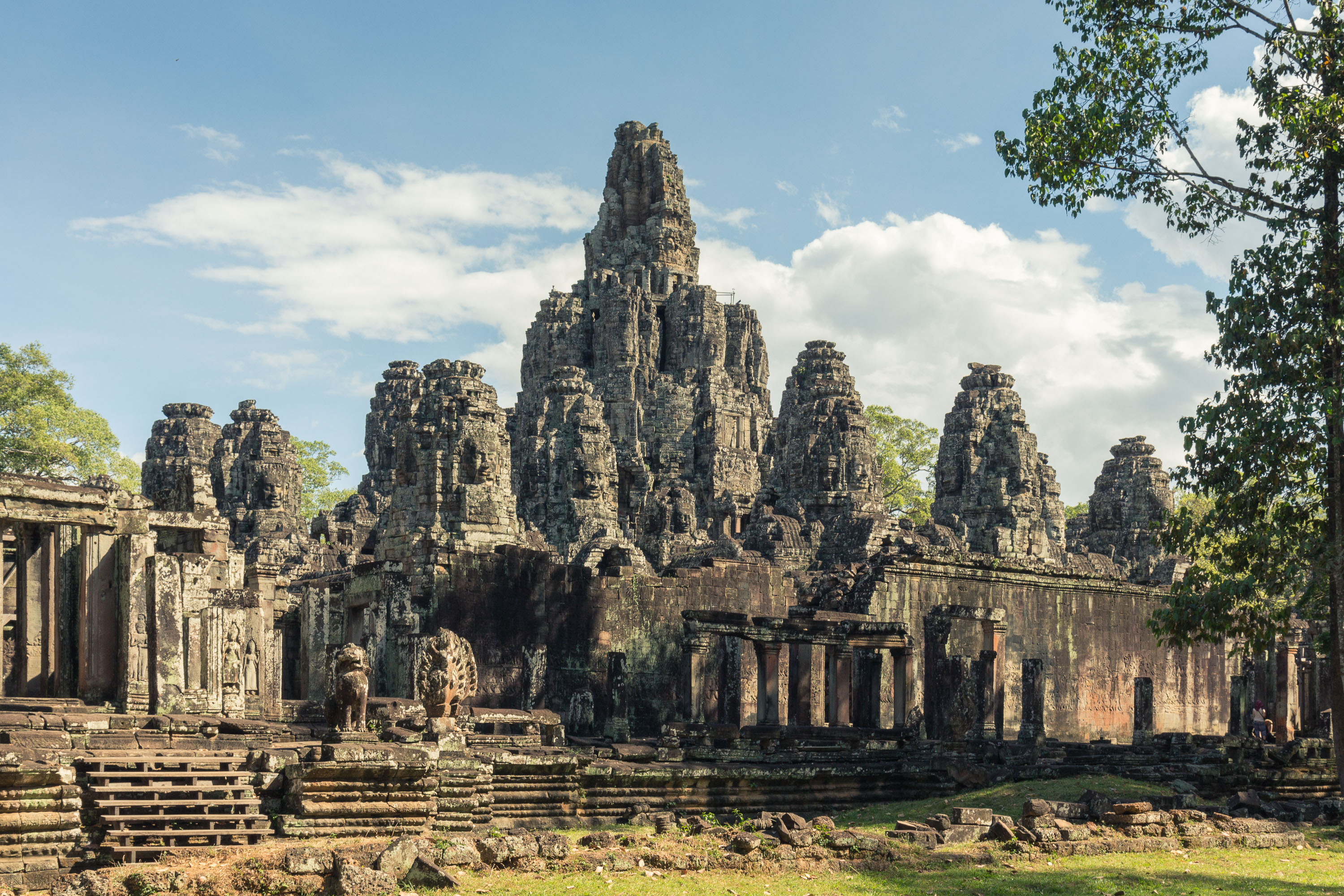

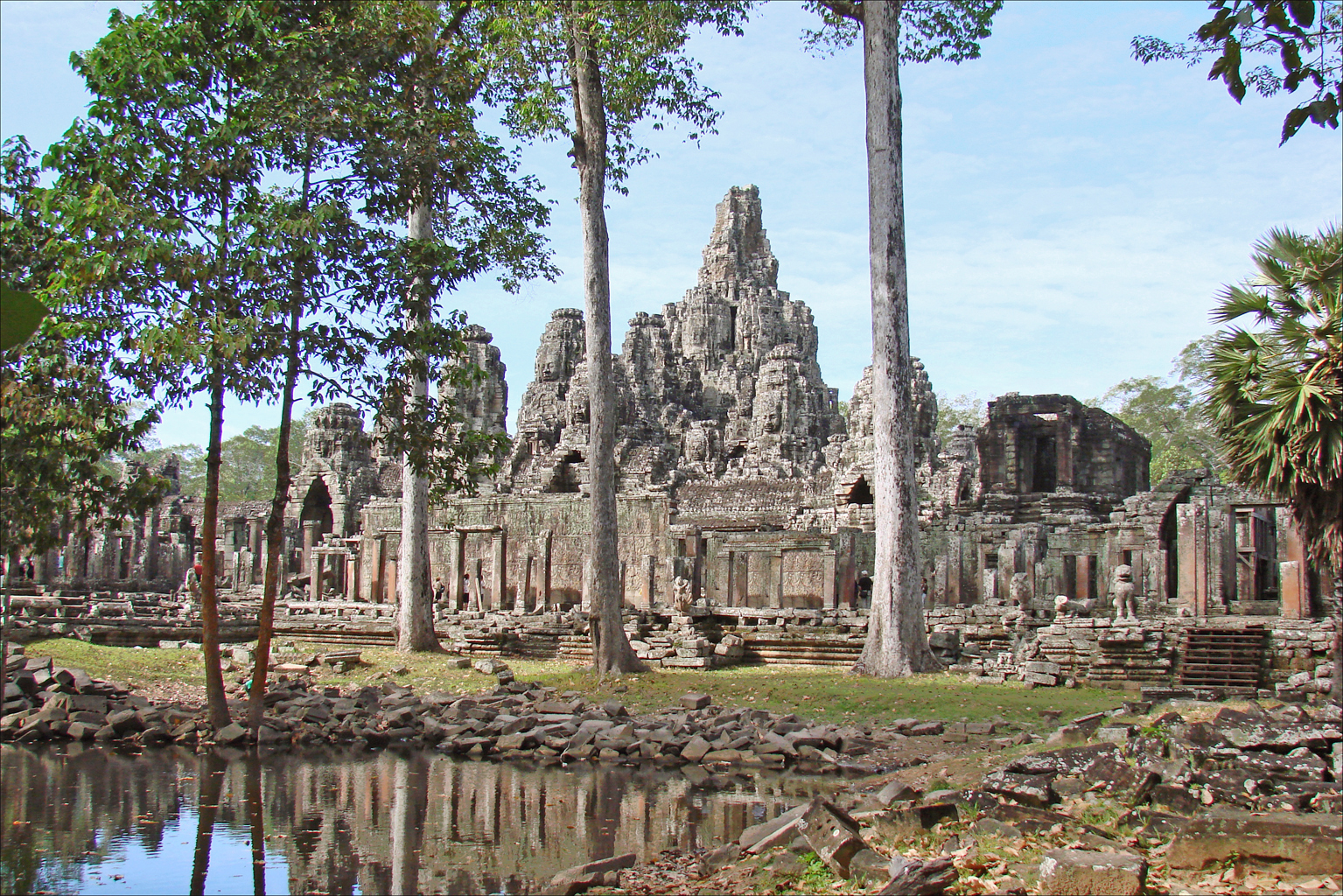

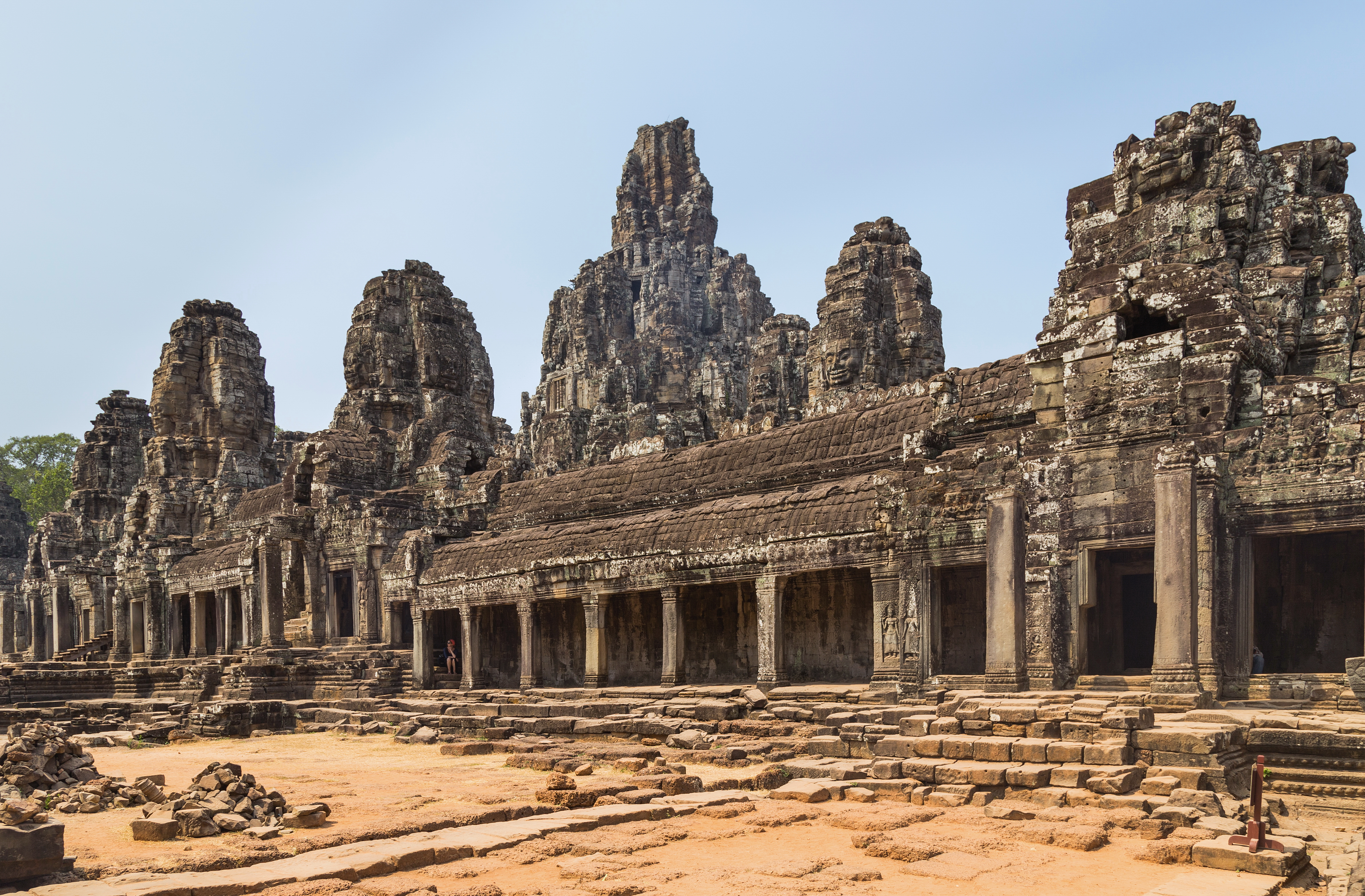

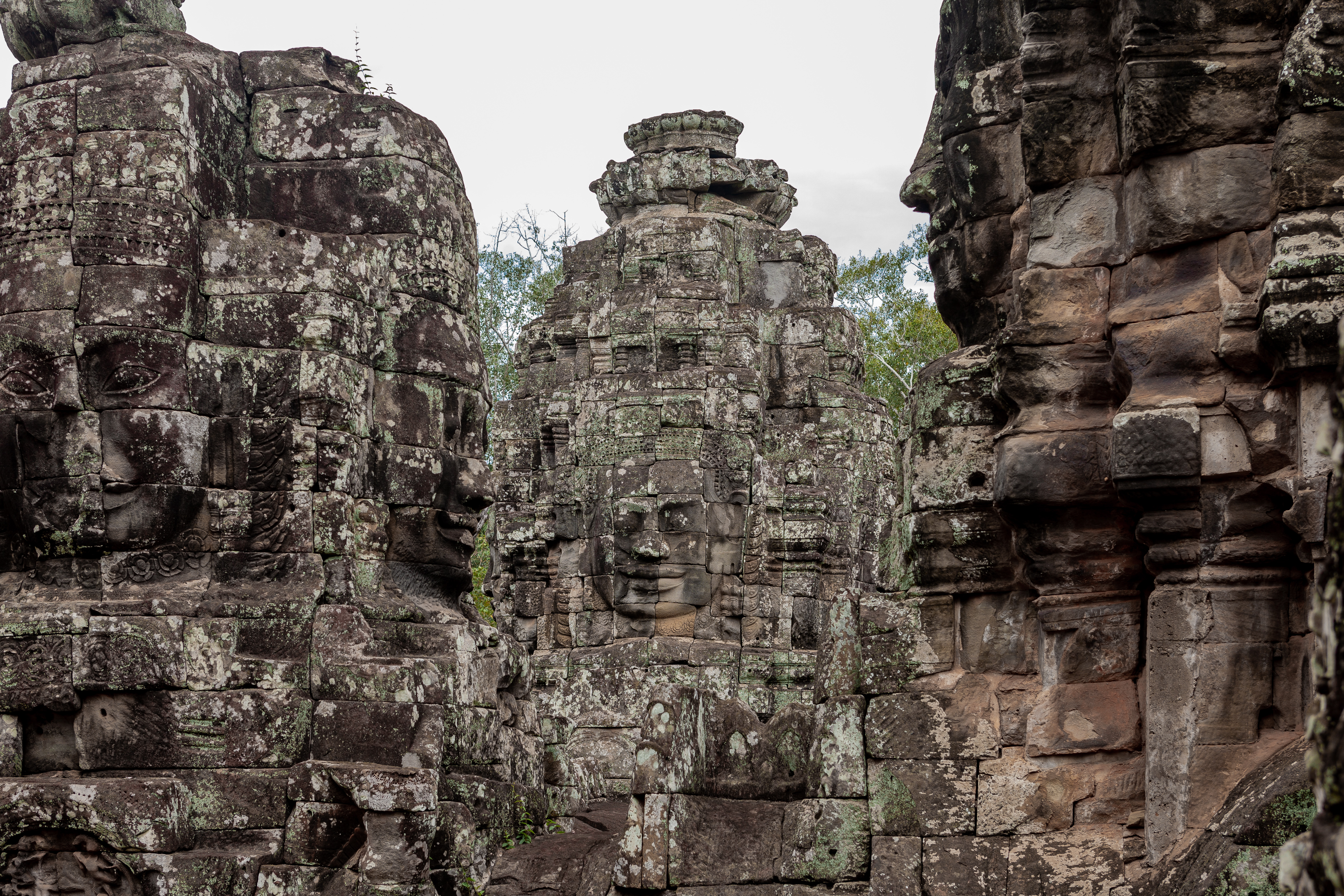

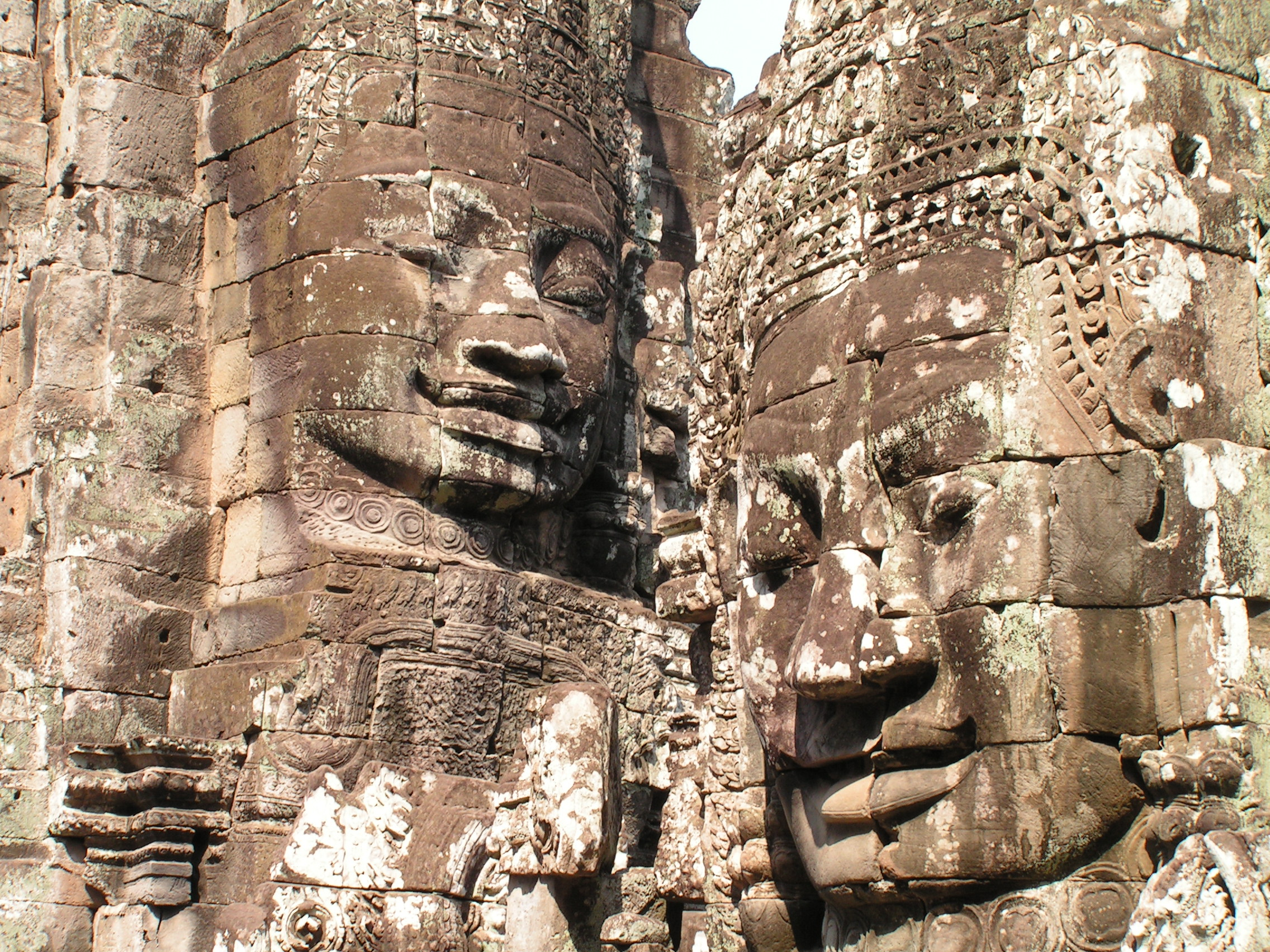

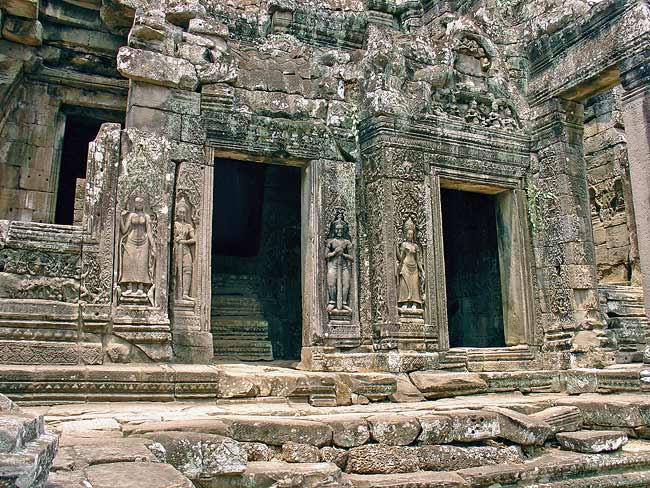

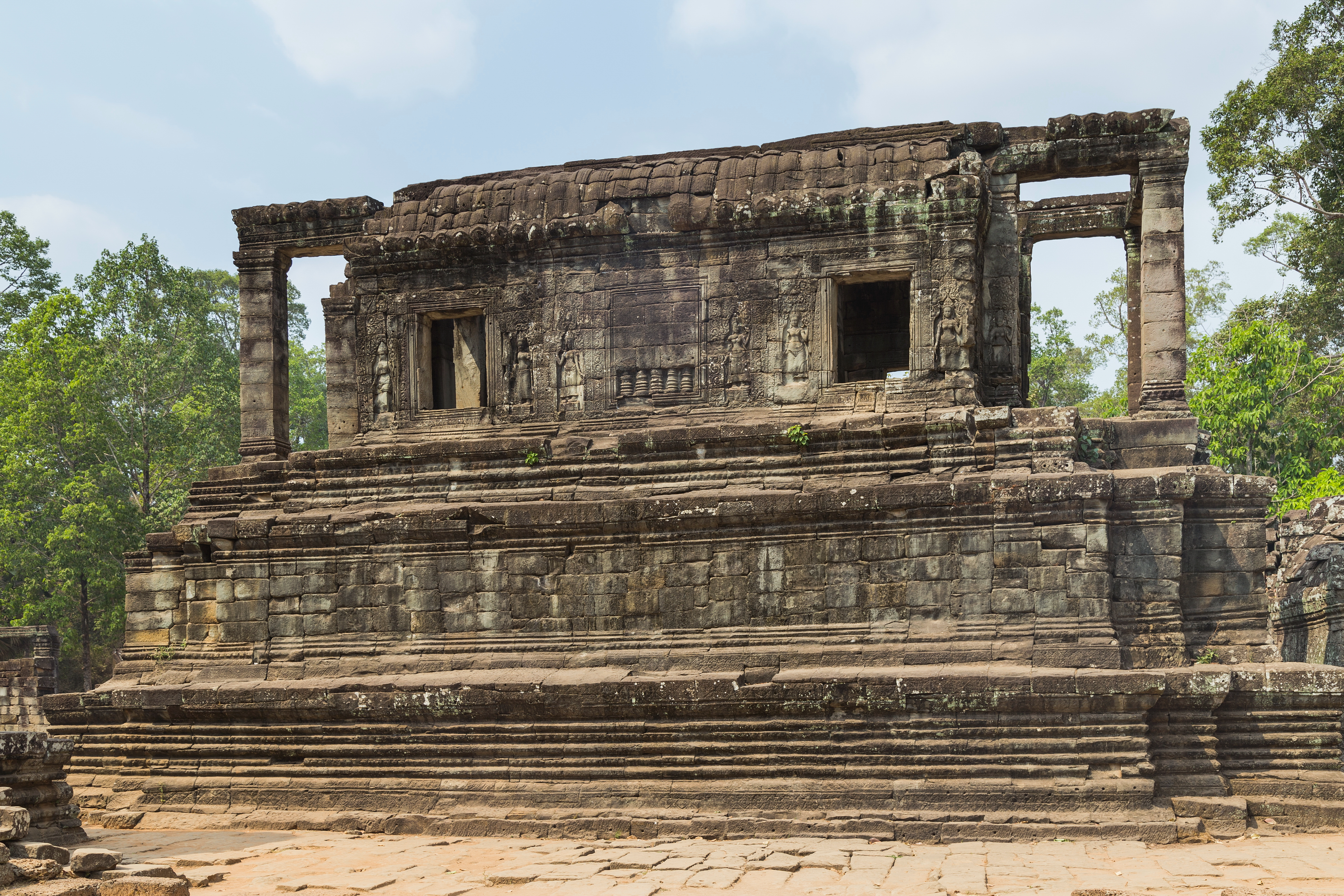

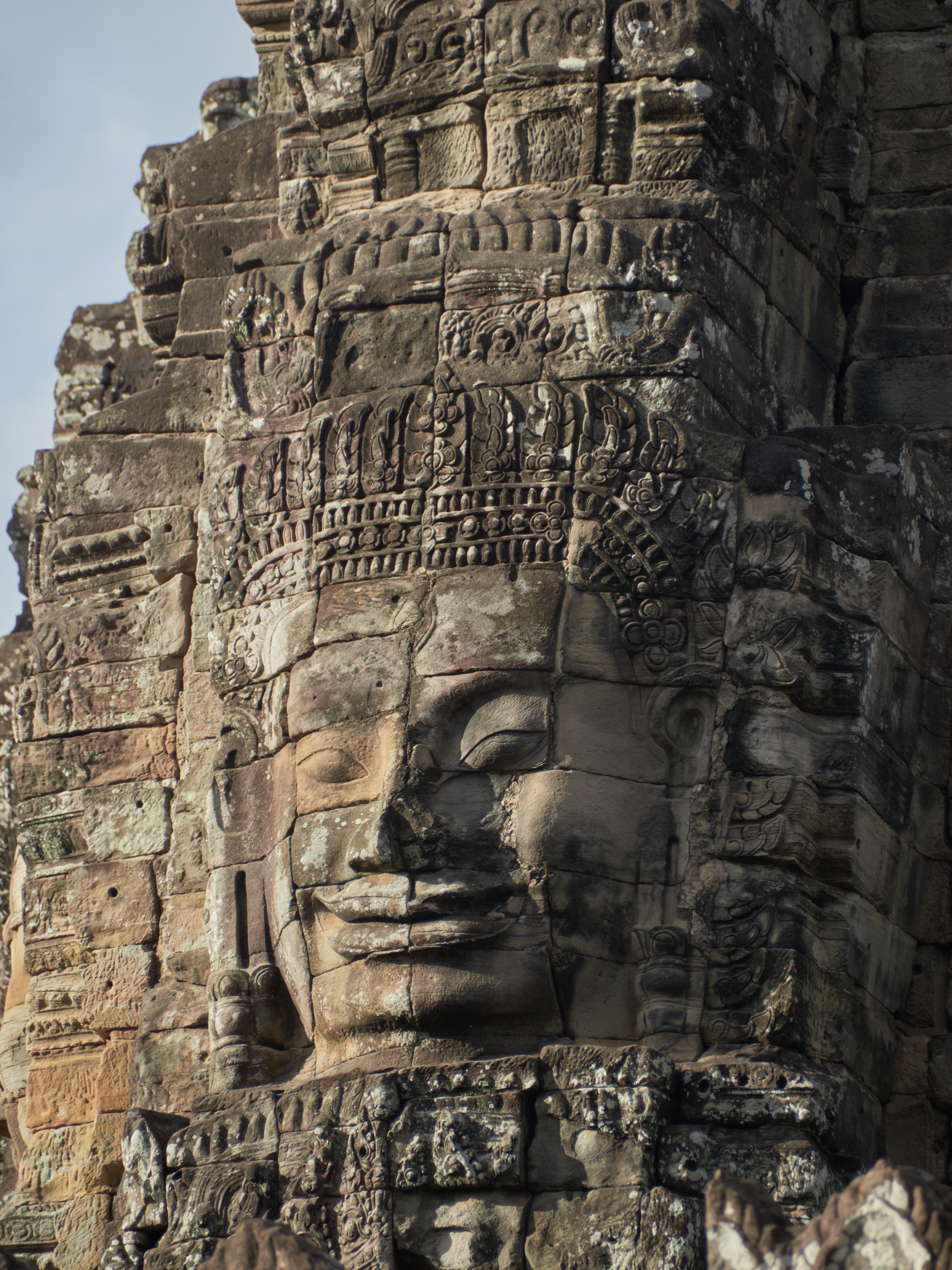

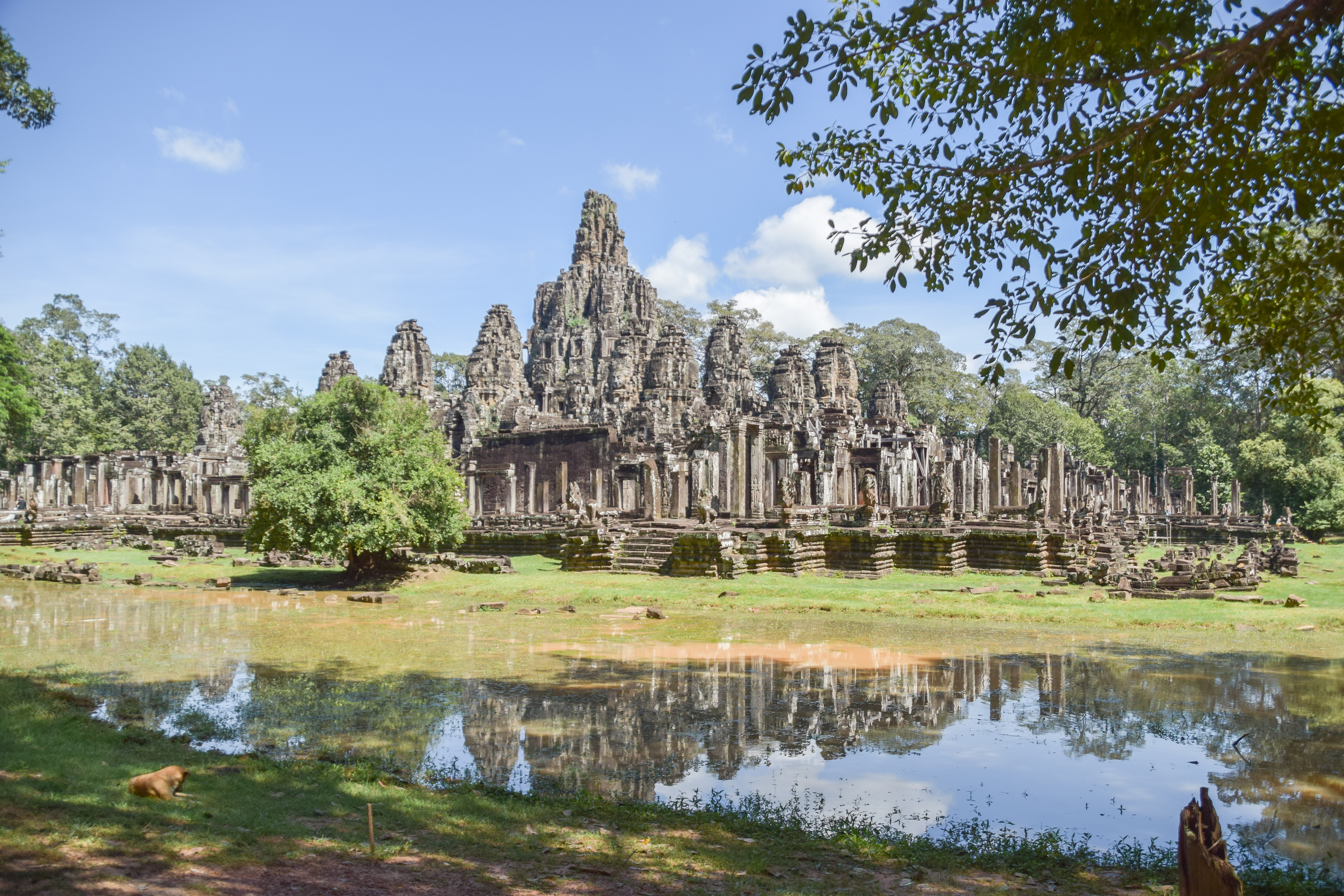

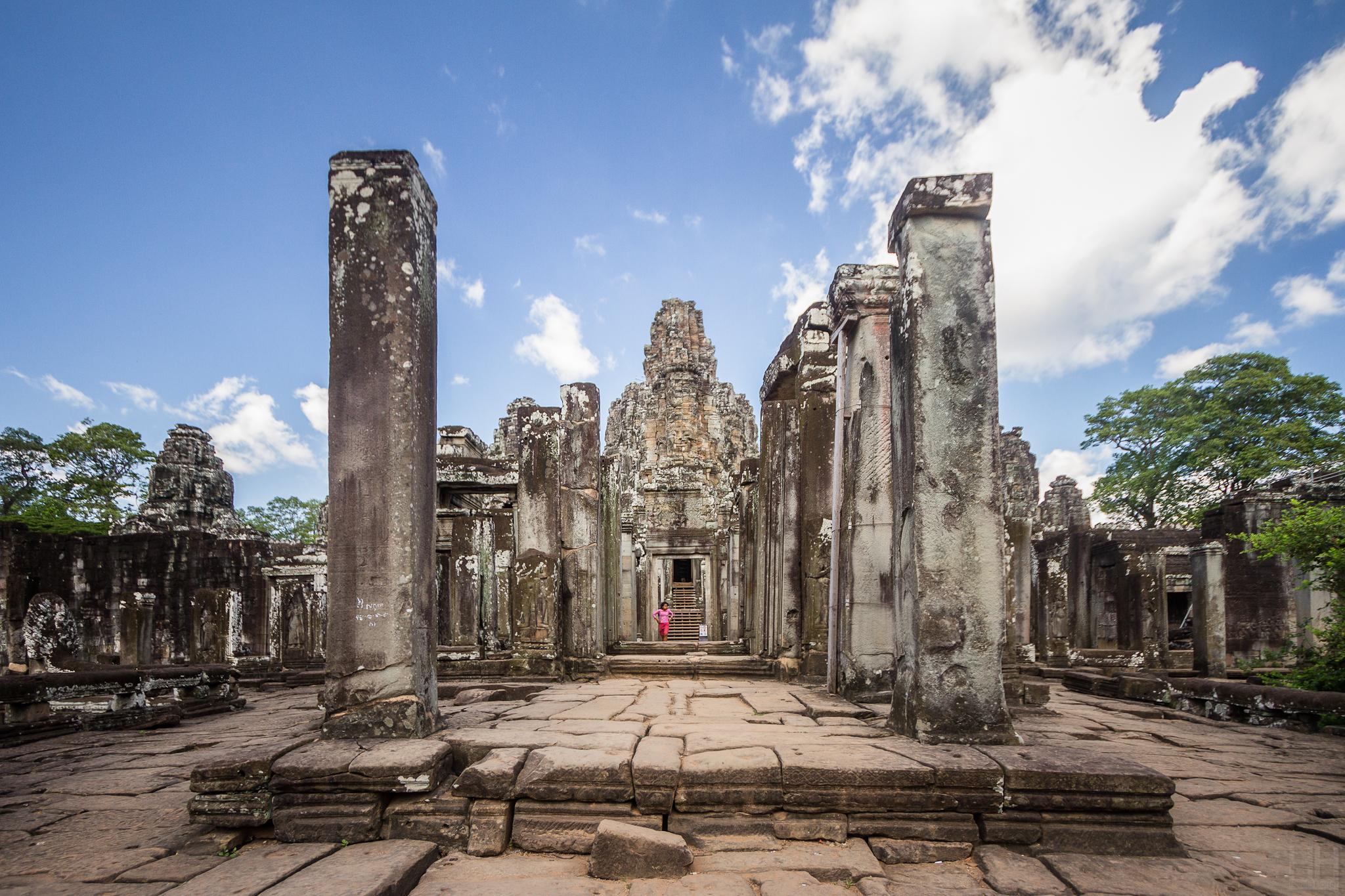

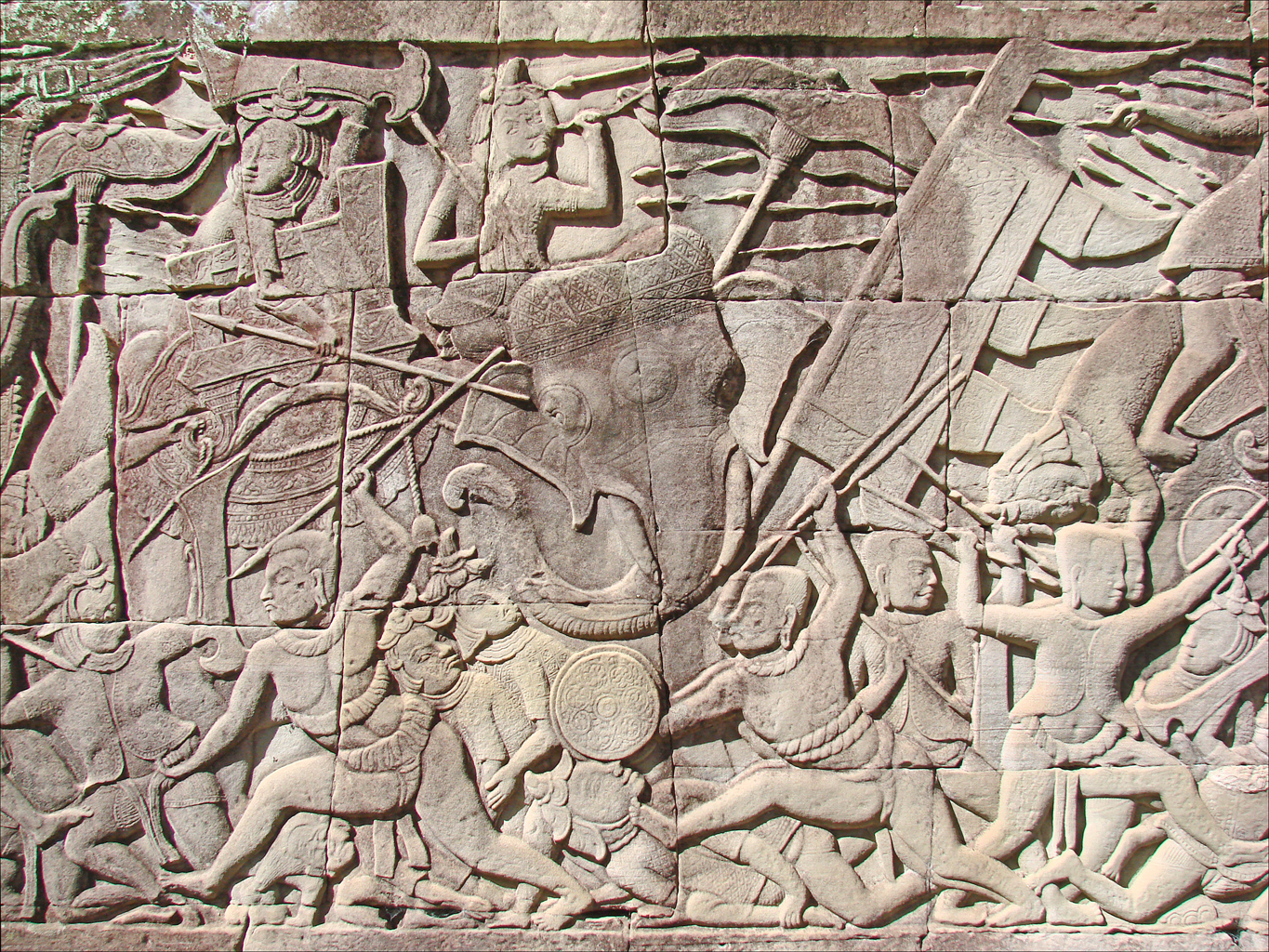

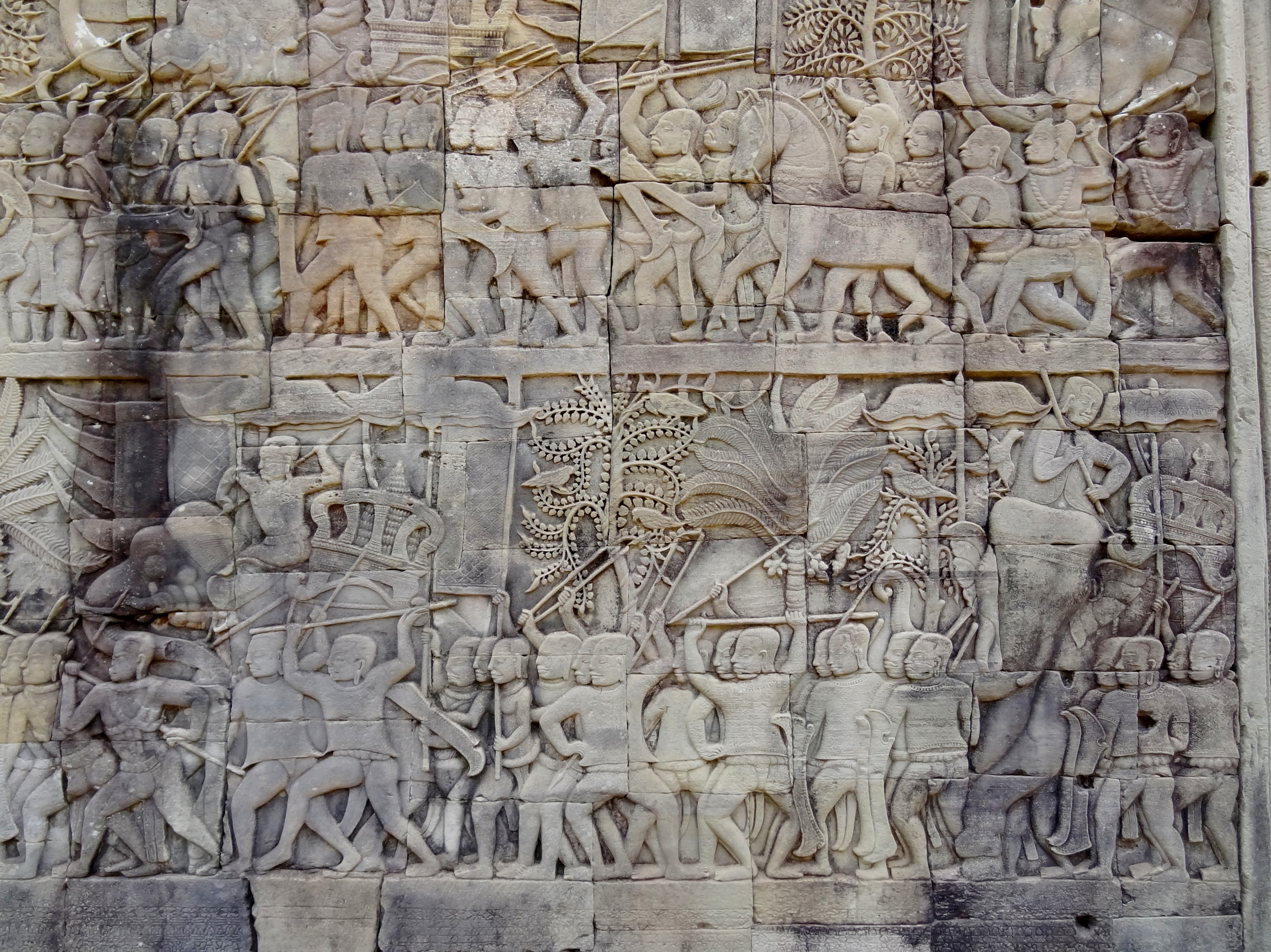

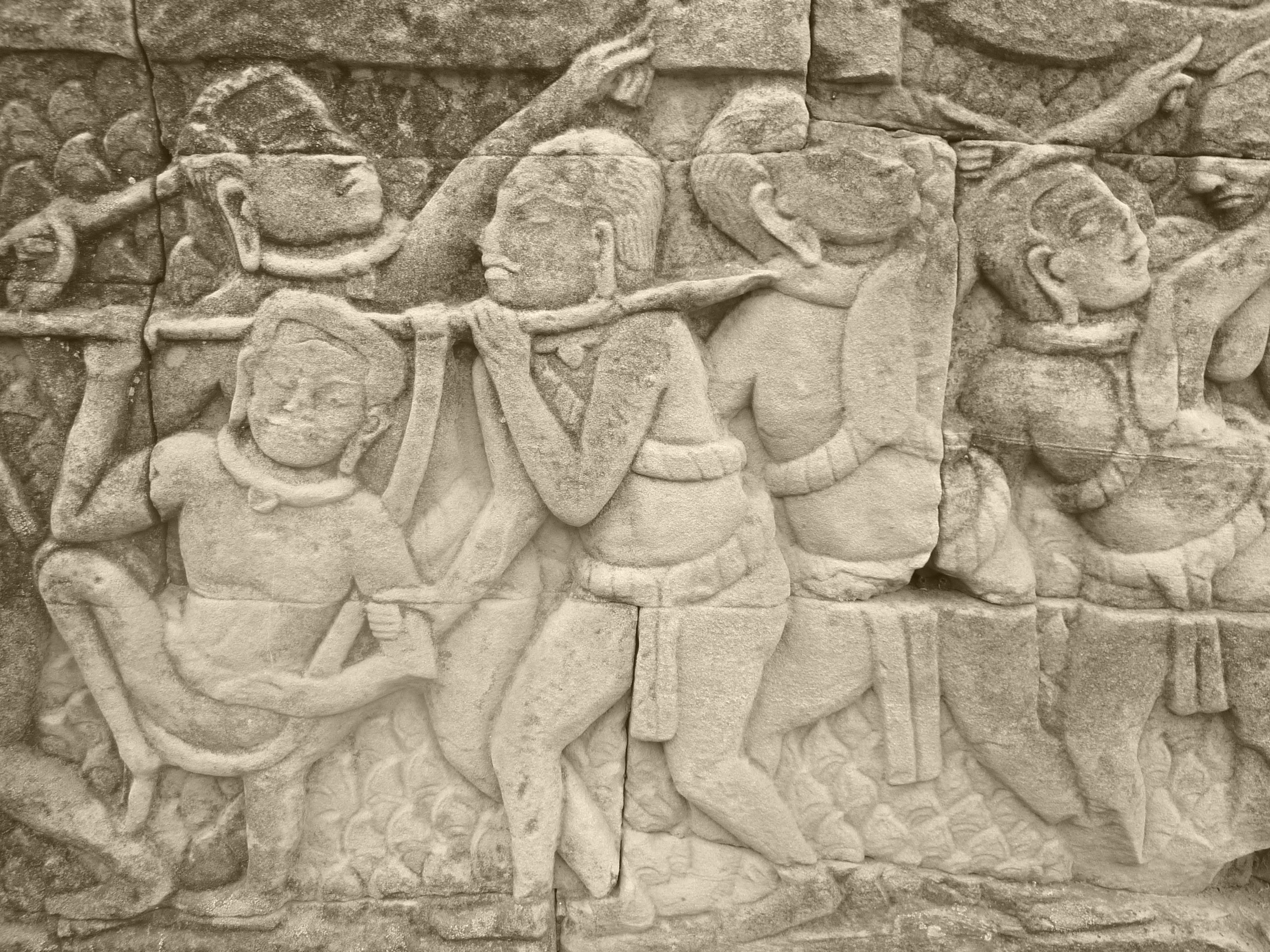

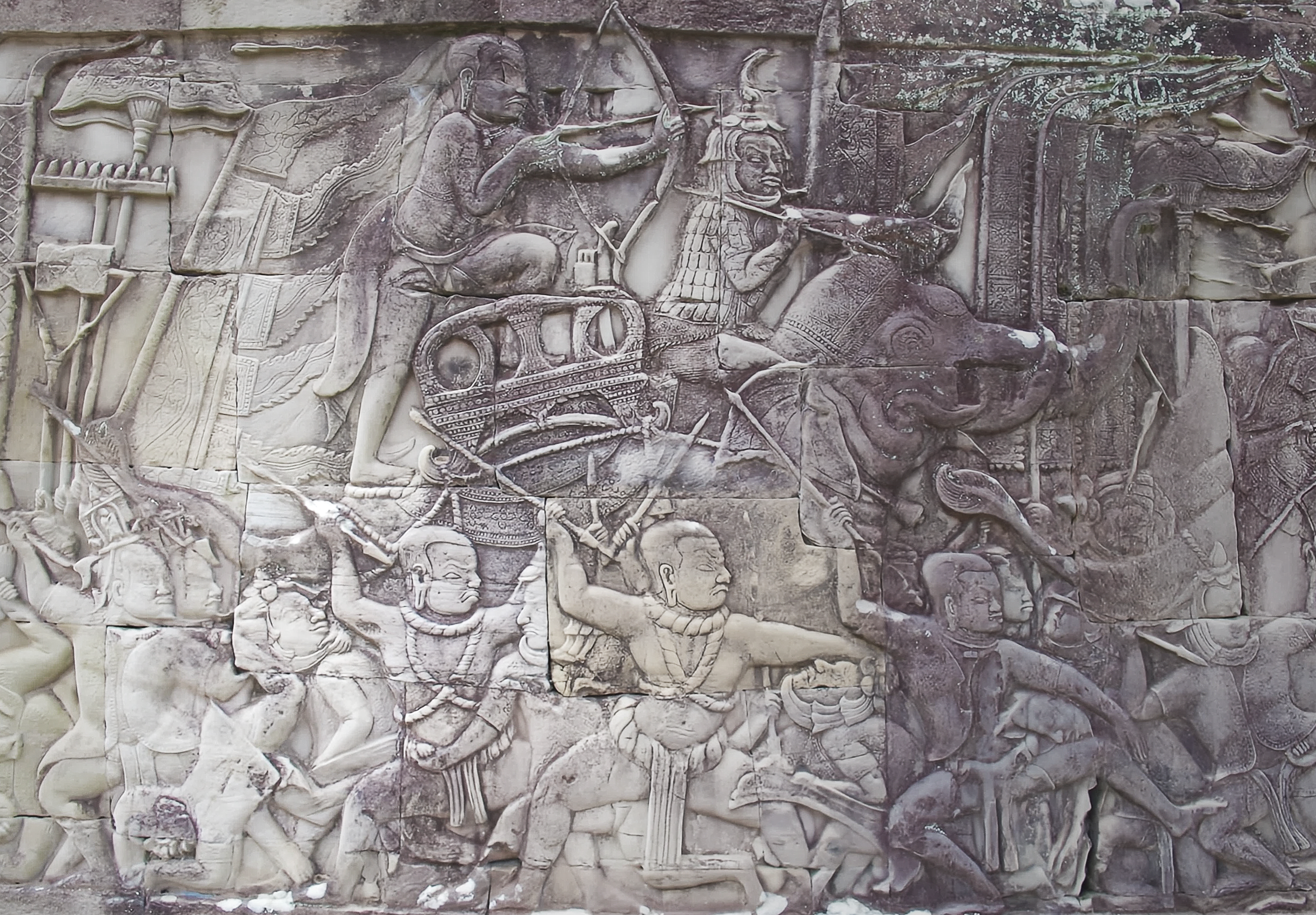

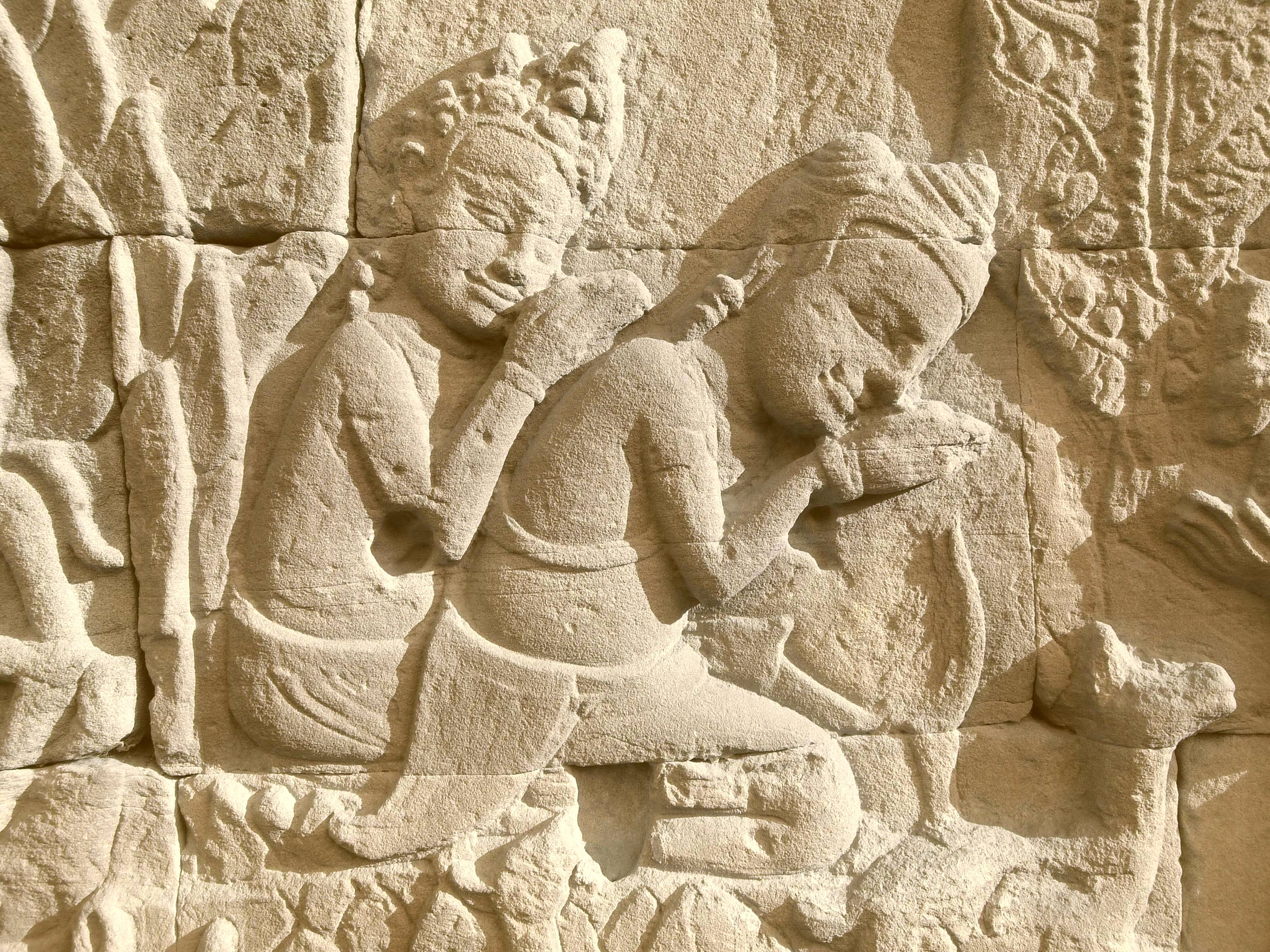

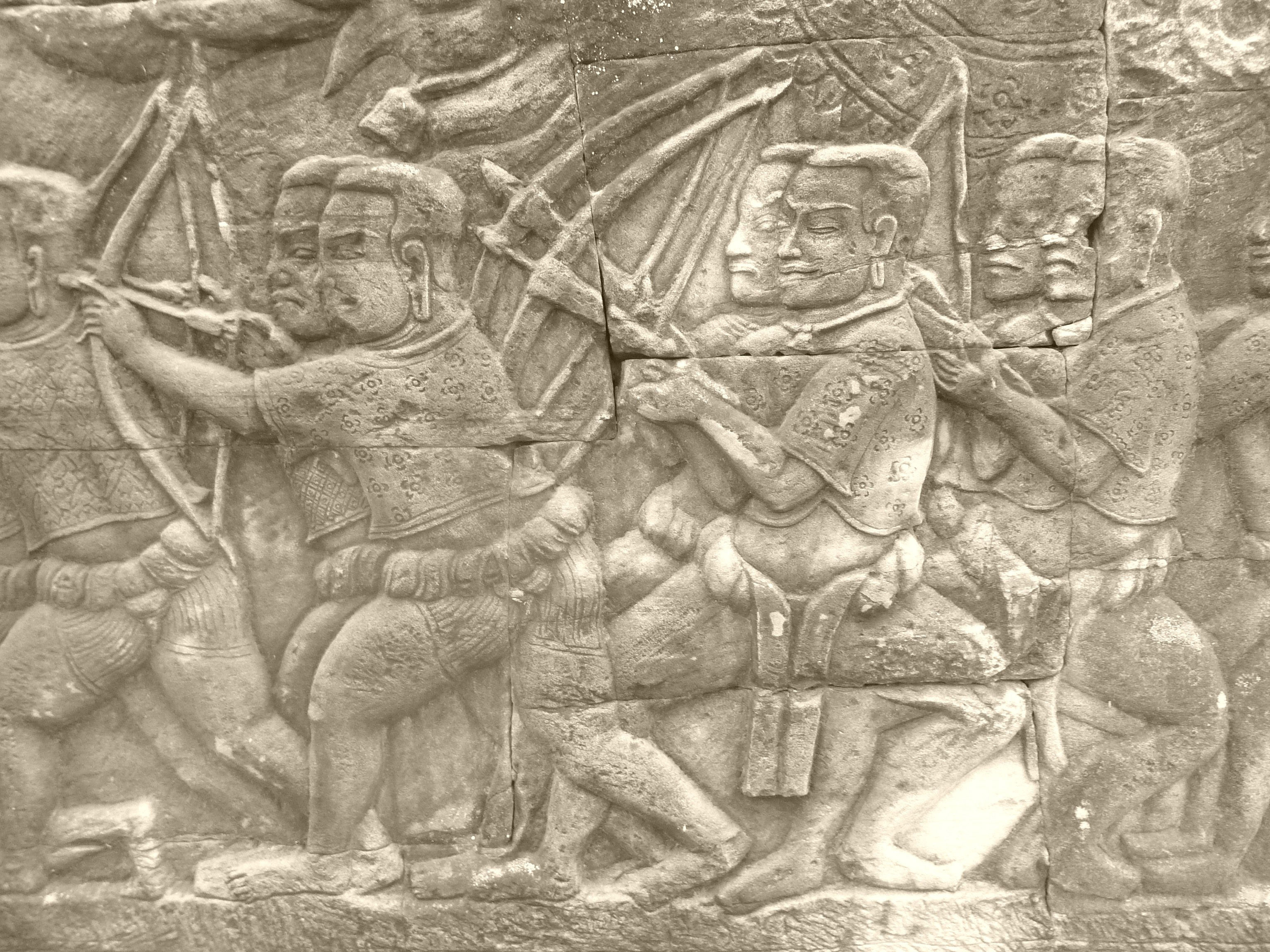

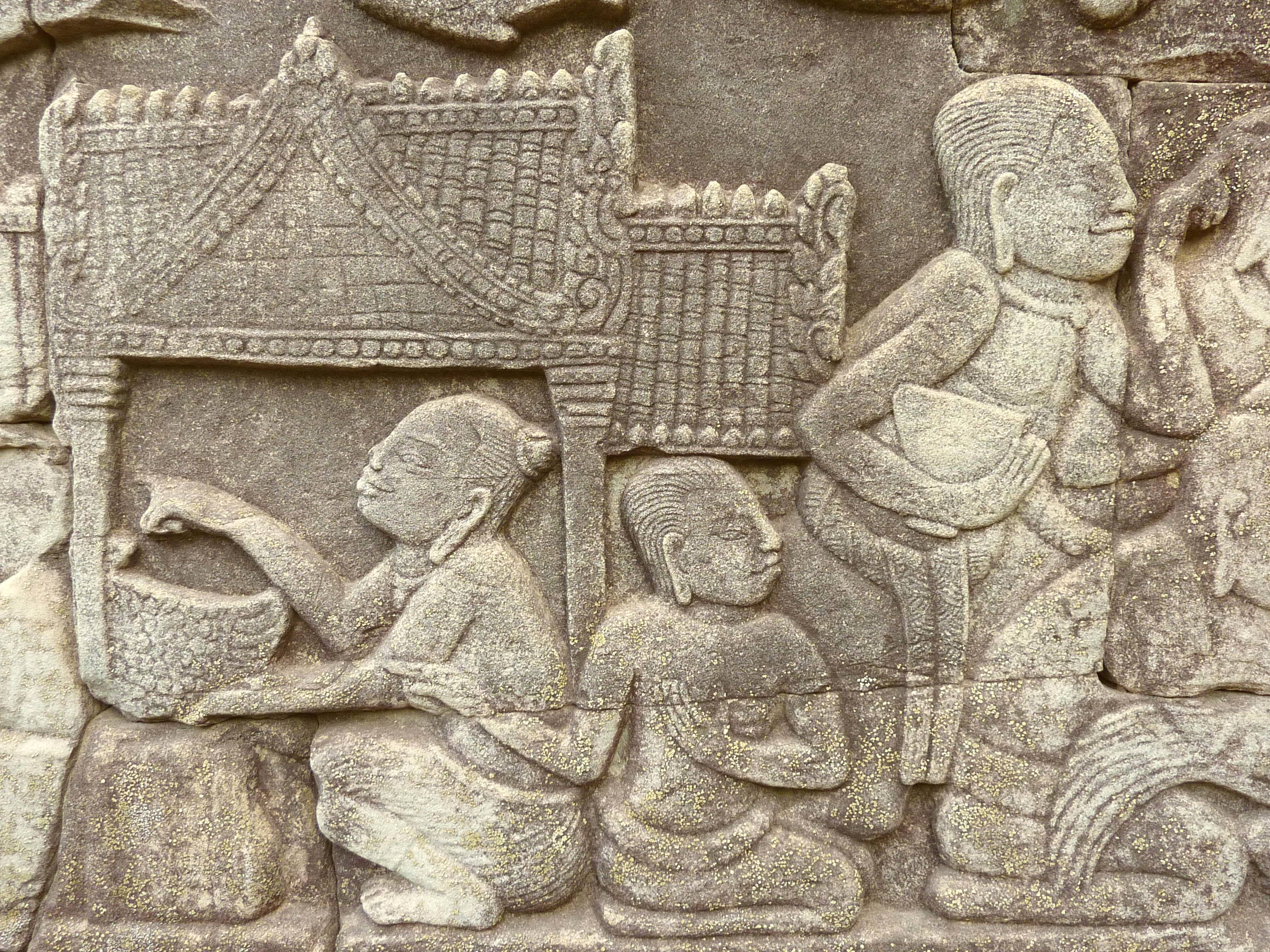

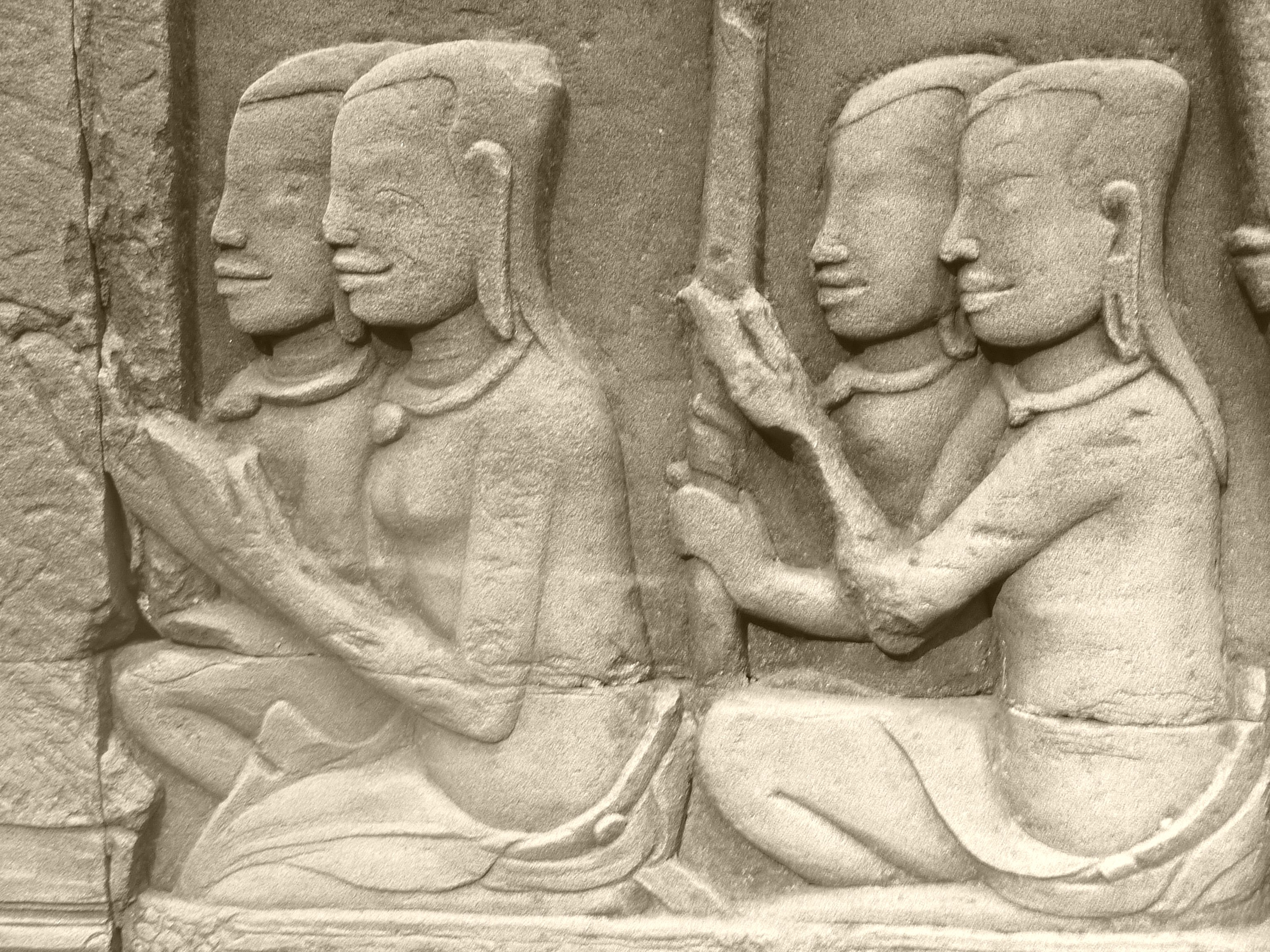

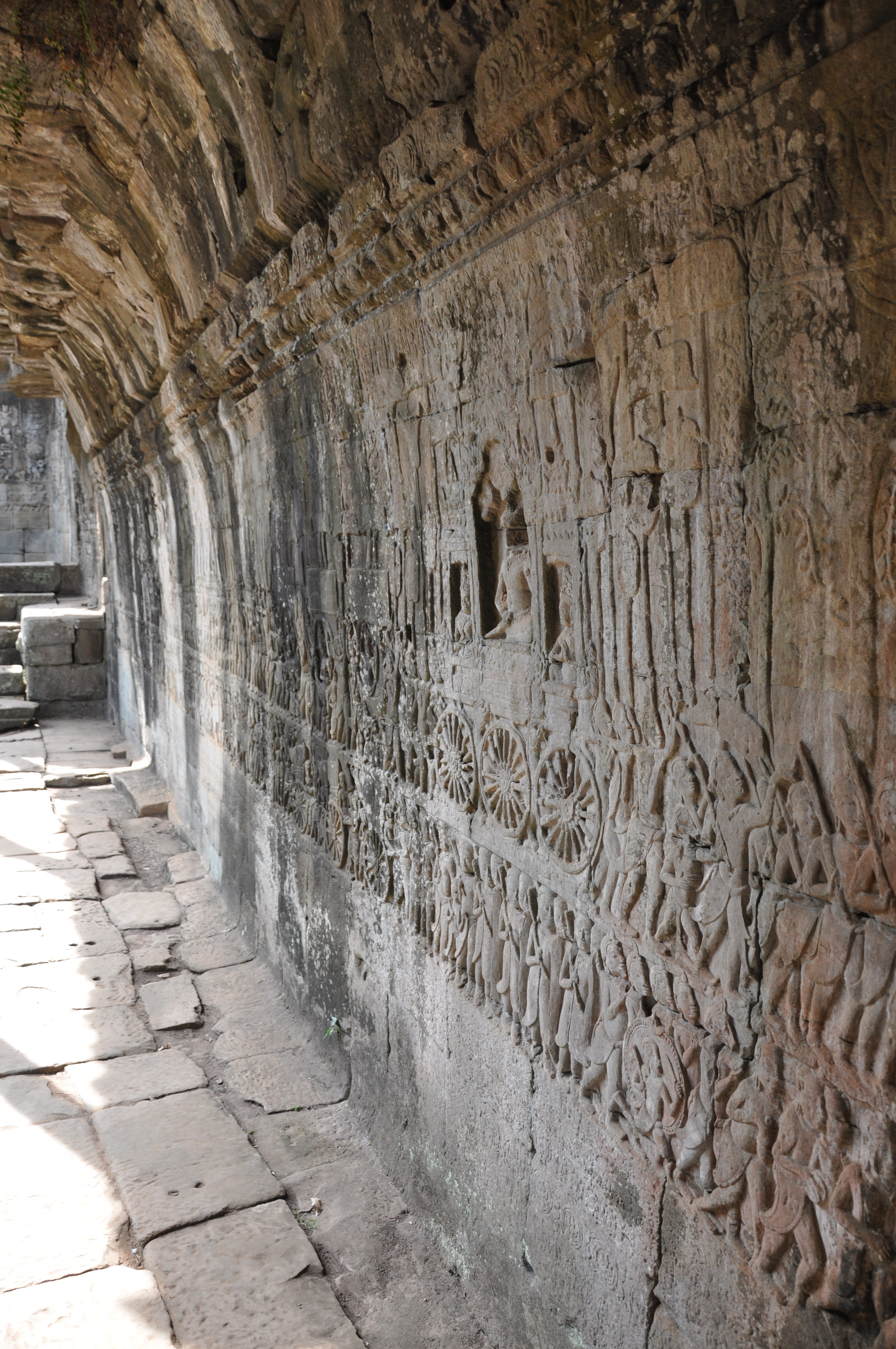

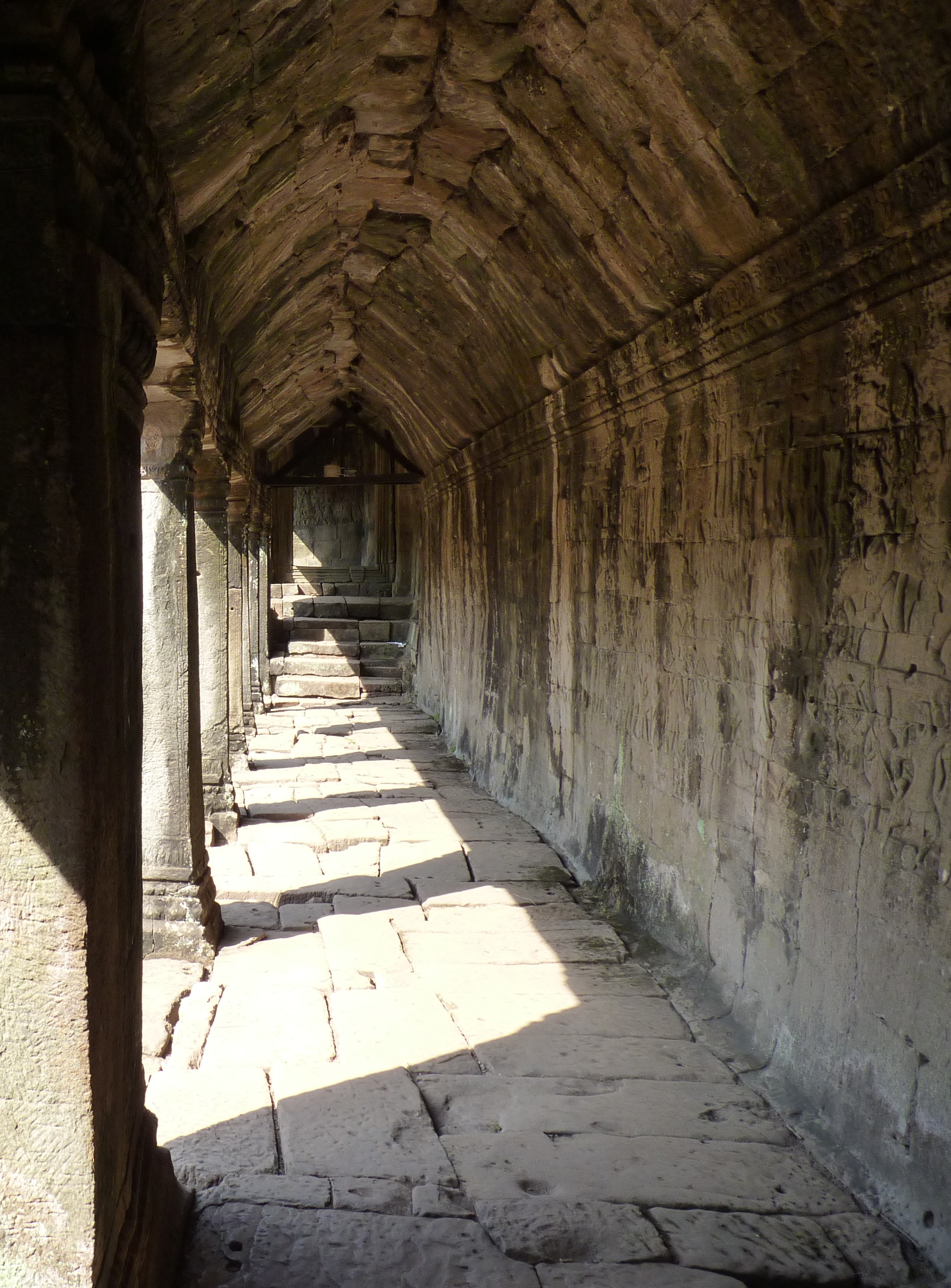

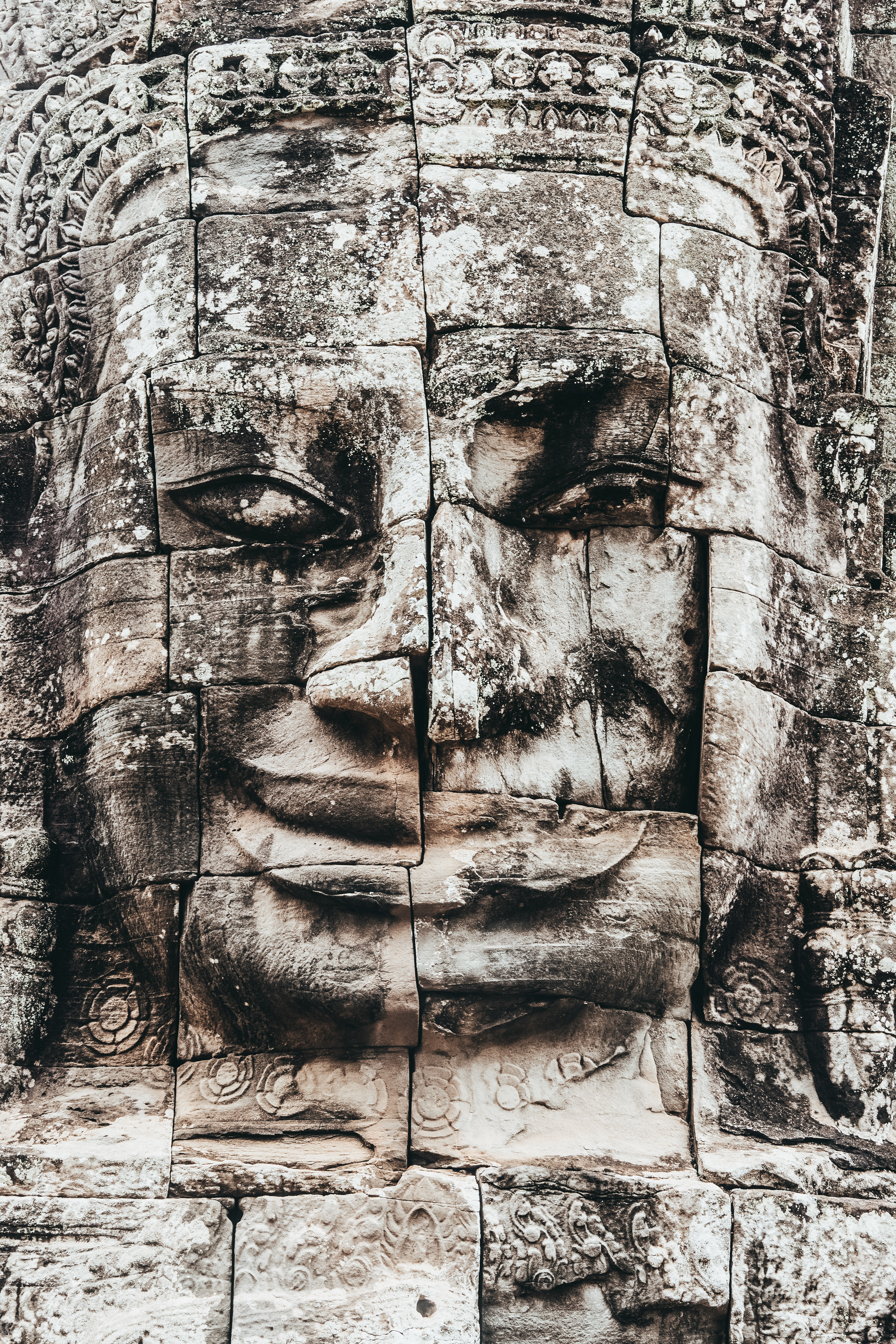

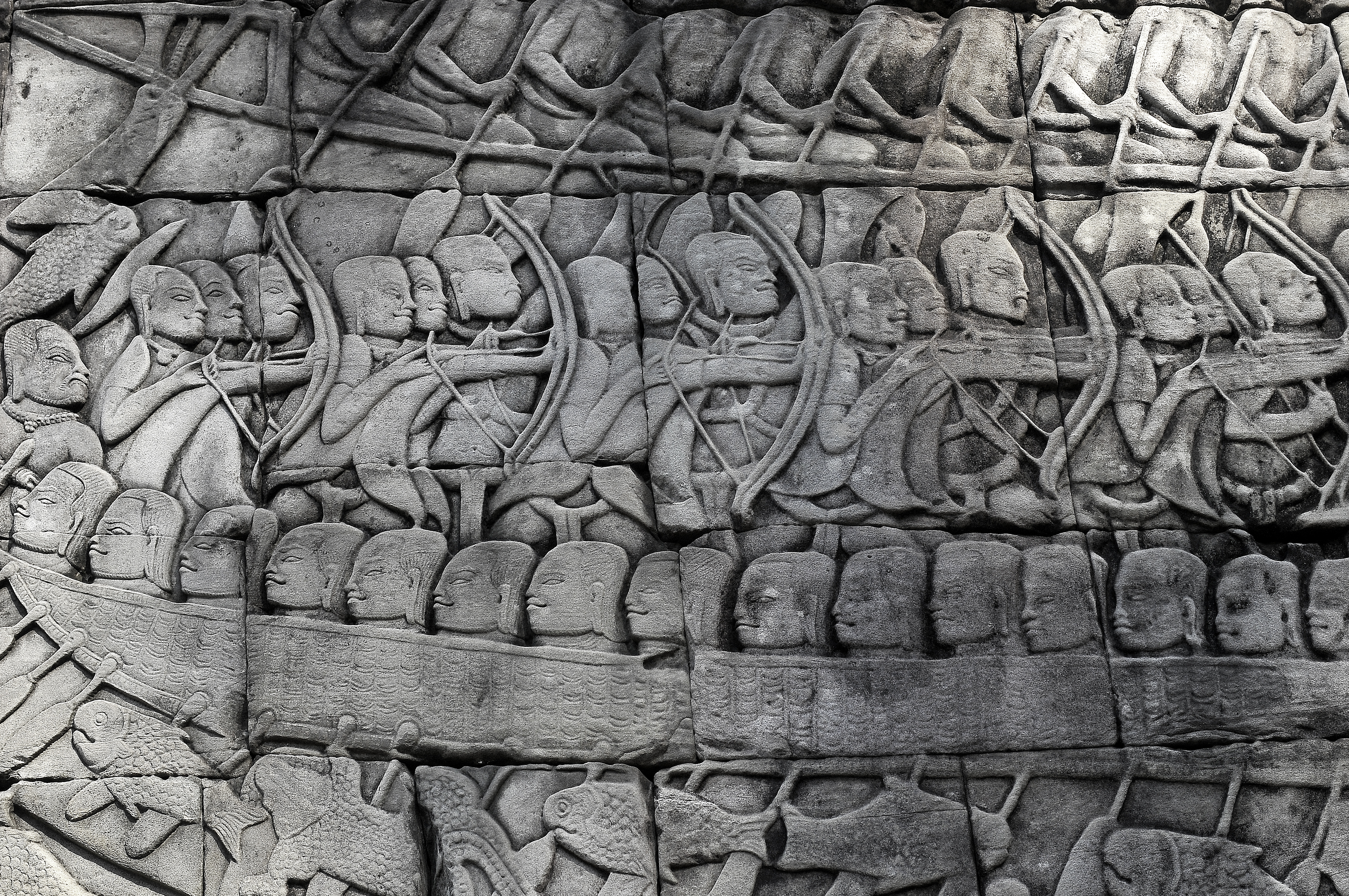

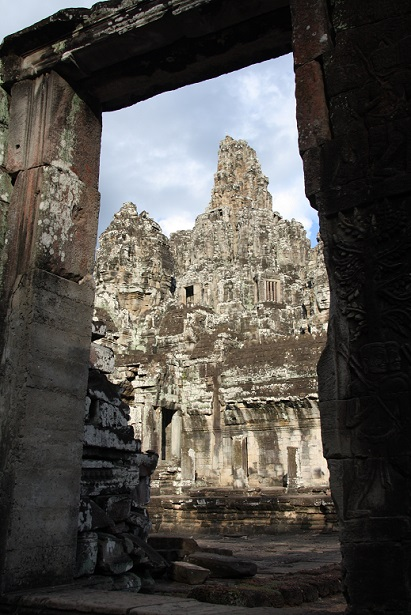

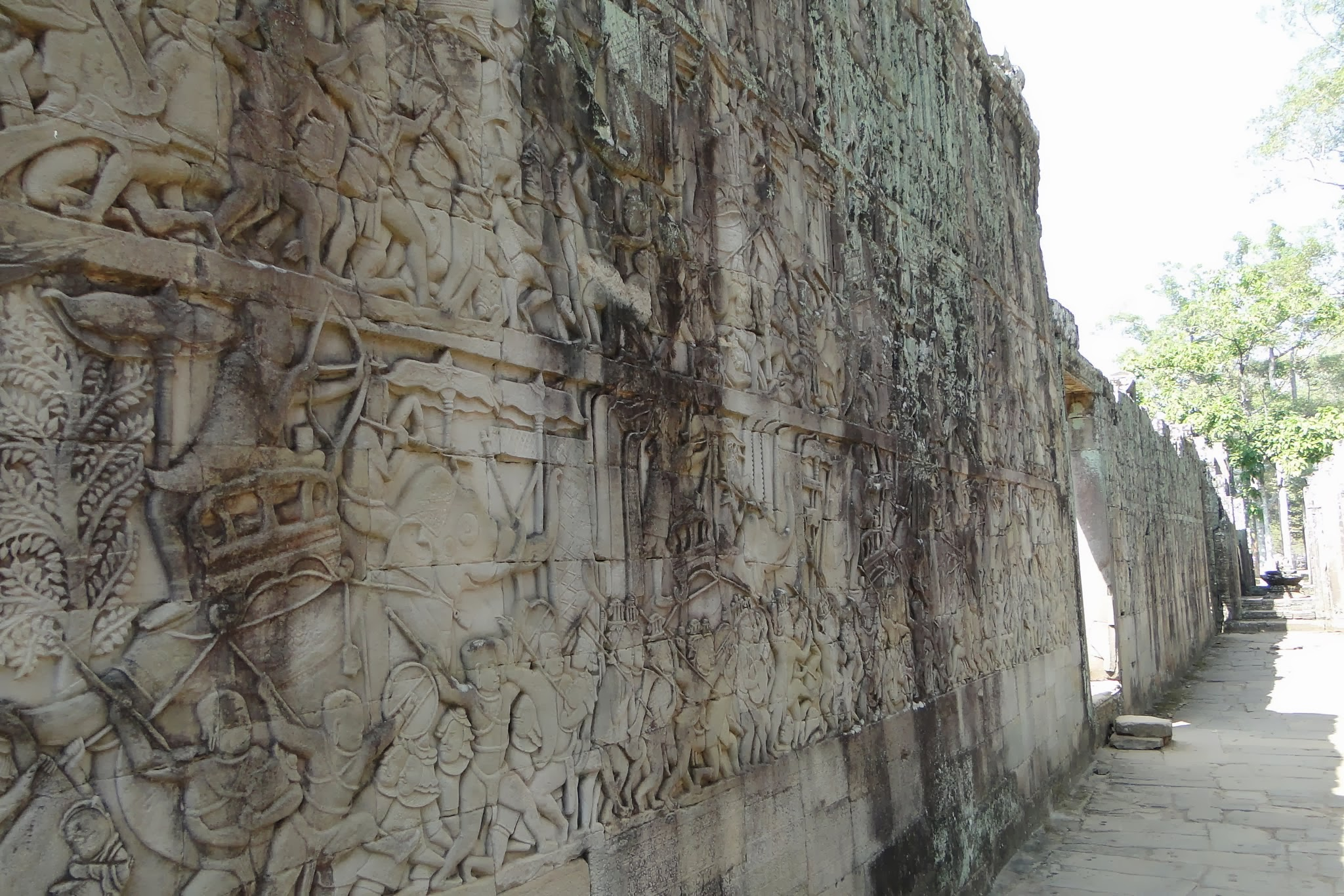

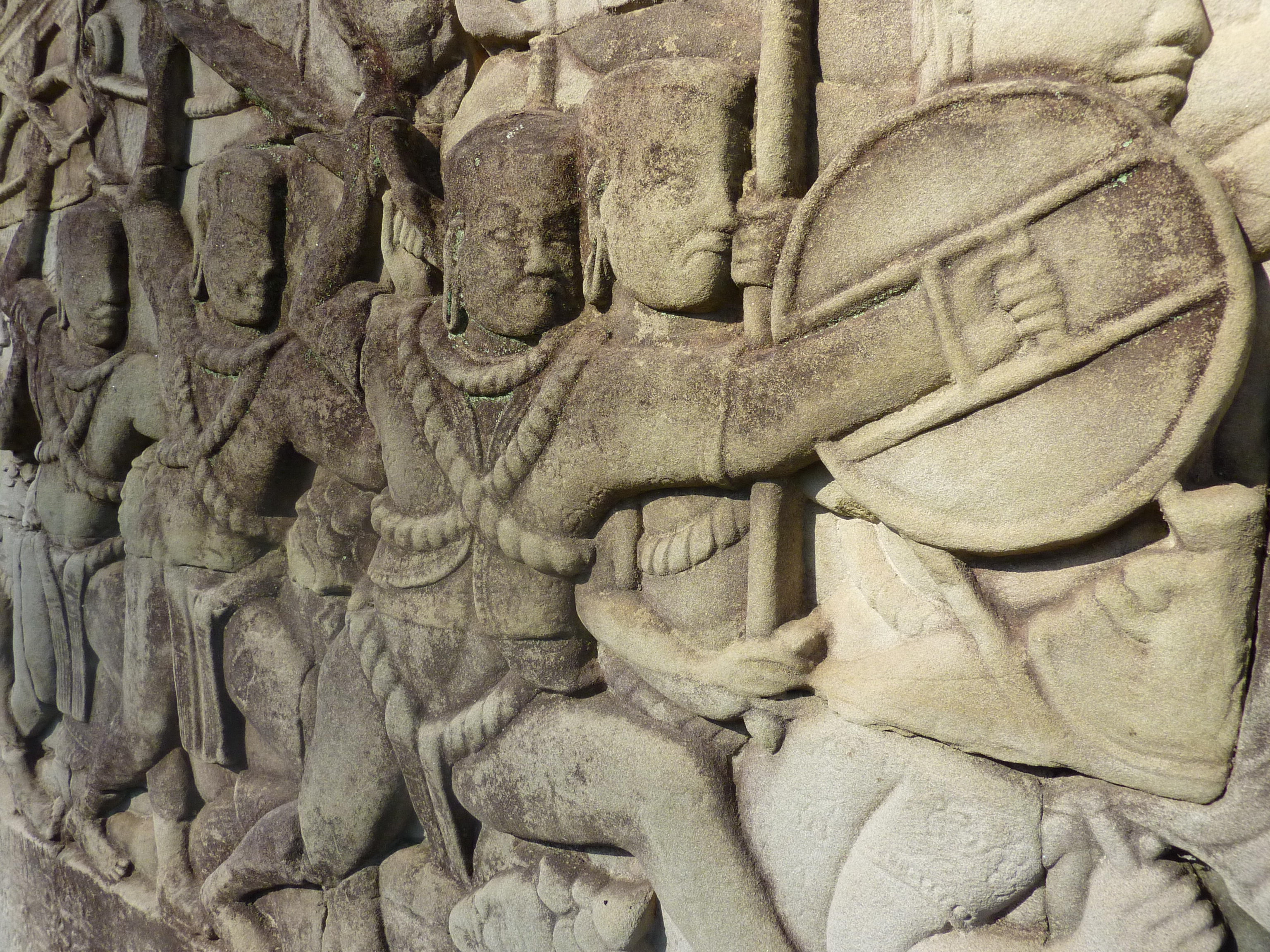

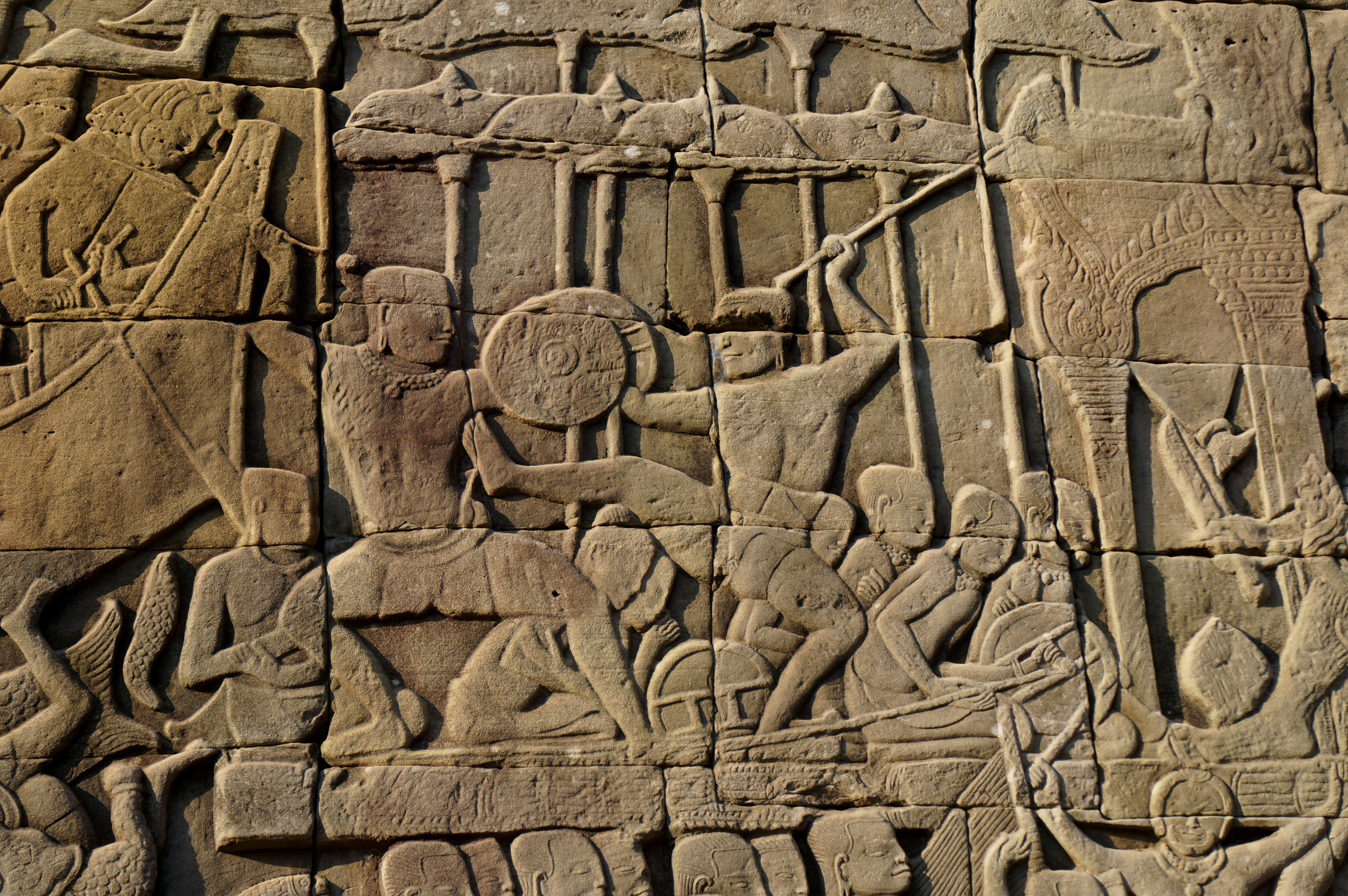

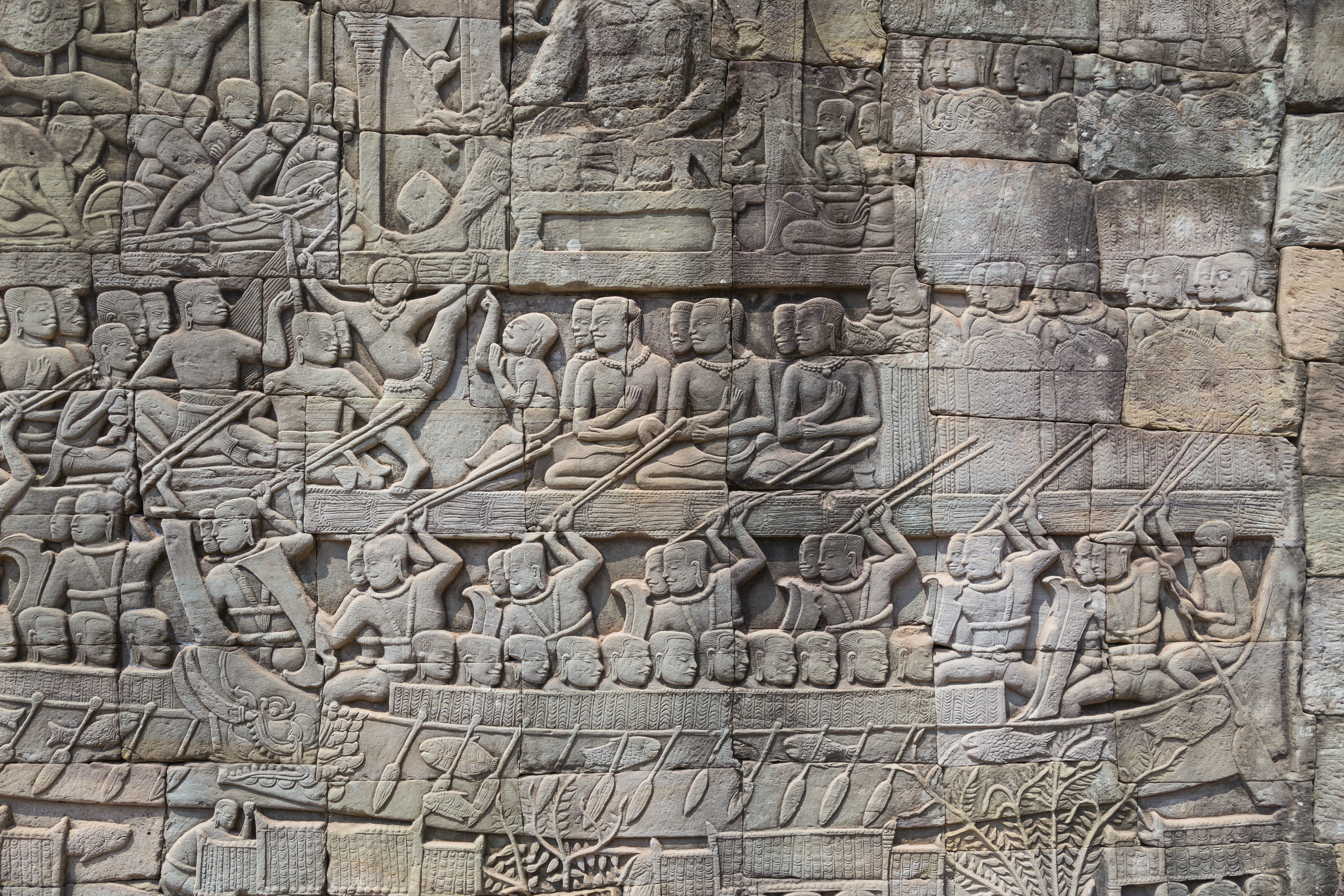

== See also ==
- Indosphere
- Greater India
- Raiō no Terasu
- Hinduism in Southeast Asia
- Buddhism in Southeast Asia
- List of Hindu temples
- List of Buddhist temples

== Bibliography ==
- Albanese, Marilia (2006). The Treasures of Angkor (Paperback). Vercelli: White Star Publishers. ISBN 88-544-0117-X.
- Coedès, George. Pour mieux comprendre Angkor (Hanoi: Imprimerie D'Extrême-Orient, 1943), esp. Ch.6, "Le mystère du Bayon," pp. 119–148.
- Freeman, Michael and Jacques, Claude. Ancient Angkor. River Books, 1999, pp. 78 ff. ISBN 0-8348-0426-3.
- Glaize, Maurice. The Monuments of the Angkor Group. Translated into English from the French, revised 1993 and published online at theangkorguide.com. (The link takes you directly to the section of this work having to do with Angkor Thom and the Bayon.)
- Jessup, Helen Ibbitson; Brukoff, Barry (2011). Temples of Cambodia - The Heart of Angkor (Hardback). Bangkok: River Books. ISBN 978-616-7339-10-8.
- Rovedo, Vittorio. Khmer Mythology: Secrets of Angkor (New York: Weatherhill, 1998), pp. 131 ff.
- JSA Bayon Master Plan Accessed May 17, 2005.
- JSA Bayon Symposia Accessed May 17, 2005.
