= Indravarman III =

- King of the Khmer Empire
- Reign: 1295 – 1308
- Predecessor: Jayavarman VIII
- Successor: Indrajayavarman
- Spouse: Srindrabhupesvarachuda
- Religion: Theravada Buddhism

Indravarman III (Khmer: ឥន្ទ្រវរ្ម័នទី៣), also titled Srindravarman (Khmer: ស្រីន្ទ្រវរ្ម័ន) was a ruler of the Khmer Empire from 1295 to 1308. He rose to power after the abdication of his father in law Jayavarman VIII, whose eldest daughter, Srindrabhupesvarachuda, he had married. Indravarman III was a follower of Theravada Buddhism and upon his ascension to power he made it the state religion.

He was entrusted with the command of the army. His lover, princess Srindrabhupesvera Cuda, stole the Sacred Sword from the king and gave it to him. The crown prince prepared to resist but Indravarman seized him, had his toes cut off, and then put him in prison. Having put down any resistance to his grab for power, he was then crowned king by the royal hotar Vidyesavid. He then married the princess to legitimize his reign. Later on he married Suryalakshmi, the niece of Vidyesavid.

According to legends he was known for his special weapon, a bat made of ironwood.

In August 1296, the Chinese diplomat Zhou Daguan arrived in Angkor and recorded, "In the recent war with the Siamese, the country was utterly devastated". He remained at the court of Srindravarman until July 1297. He was neither the first nor the last Chinese representative to visit Kambuja. His stay is notable, however, because Zhou later wrote a detailed report on life in Angkor. His portrayal of the empire is today one of the most important sources of understanding historical Angkor. Alongside the descriptions within several great temples (the Bayon, the Baphuon, Angkor Wat), his account informs us that the towers of the Bayon were once covered in gold; the text also offers valuable information on the everyday life and habits of the inhabitants of Angkor.

Regnal titles
Preceded by Jayavarman VIII	King of Cambodia; 1295–1308	Succeeded by Indrajayavarman
