= Jayavarman VIII =

- King of the Khmer Empire
- Reign: 1243 – 1295
- Predecessor: Indravarman II
- Successor: Indravarman III
- Spouse: Chakravartirajadevi
- Issue: Srindrabhupesvarachuda
- Religion: Hinduism (Shaivite)

Jayavarman VIII (Khmer: ជ័យវរ្ម័នទី៨), posthumous name Paramesvarapada, was one of the prominent kings of the Khmer empire. His rule lasted from 1243 until 1295, when he abdicated. One of his wives was Queen Chakravartirajadevi. He reverted to Hinduism from his father's religion of Buddhism and attempted to destroy Buddhism while patronizing Hinduism throughout his regime.

It was during the reign of Jayavarman VIII that the Mongol forces under the command of Kublai Khan attacked the Angkor empire in 1283. In 1281, Jayavarman VIII had imprisoned emissaries of the Mongol generalissimo in Champa. In 1283, he decided to pay tribute and buy peace and thus his rule survived. Chinese annals record that in 1291, "the king of Zhenla / 真臘" [Cambodia] sent a mission who presented "the usual tribute of gold, elephant ivory and other things". In 1290, the Mon people of Lavo kingdom abolished its status as a tributary state of the Khmer Empire because it felt the Khmer king was too weak to deal with the Mangol.

Jayavarman VIII suffered a devastating war against the Xiān.

Jayavarman VIII was a Shaivite. Many of the Buddhist images were destroyed by him, who re-established previously Hindu shrines that had been converted to Buddhism by his predecessor. Carvings of the Buddha at temples such as Preah Khan were destroyed, and during this period the Bayon Temple was made into a temple of Shiva, and cast the central 3.6-meter-tall (12 ft) statue of the Buddha into the bottom of a nearby well. He also endowed a Hindu shrine Mangalartha in 1295, just before he was overthrown by his son-in-law Indravarman III (Srindravarman), a devout Buddhist and the kingdom reverted to Buddhism.

== Mongol-Khmer war (1268) ==
In 1268, a Mongol army of approximately 300,000 under the leadership of King Kublai Khan launched an invasion of the northern Khmer Empire. The declaration of a large-scale war on the Khmer Empire caused King Jayavarman VIII to gather an army of approximately 100,000 elephants to resist the huge army of the Mongol Empire. The war between the two empires broke out in the northern Khmer Empire (now northern Laos). Although the number of the Mongol Empire's troops was large, the Mongol army could not defeat the powerful elephant army of the Khmer Empire. Therefore, the Mongol army decided not to invade the Khmer Empire further, but only provided weapons and artillery to the Siamese Sukhothai to help break up the Khmer Empire's army. Jayavarman VIII's massive elephant collection left so many elephants in the northern Khmer Empire during the Mongol and Khmer wars that the Laotians, who declared independence from the Lancang Kingdom, translated it as a million elephants.

== Battle of Prey Nokor ==
In 1283, the Yuan Dynasty of the Mongol Empire launched a second invasion of the Khmer Empire by sea, using 500 small and large warships under the leadership of a general named "Sogatu" who invaded the city of Prey Nokor, located in the southeast of the Khmer Empire. The armies of the two empires fought fiercely, as the Mongols were better equipped with weapons and artillery. Eventually, the Mongols overpowered the Khmer army and captured the city's treasures, including a Cambodian philosopher named "Danha Chey". Although the Mongols were superior to the Khmer army, the Mongols were unable to defeat the Khmer army. Two Mongol generals were captured in the fighting, and a prisoner exchange agreement was made after King Jayavarman VIII agreed to pay tribute to the Mongol emperor Kublai Khan in 1285 AD, after he saw that the cost of the war between the two empires was enormous.

Regnal titles
Preceded by Indravarman II	King of Cambodia; 1243–1295	Succeeded by Indravarman III
