= Srindrabhupesvarachuda =

- Born: 13th-century
- Died: 14th-century
- Occupations: Princess, Queen
- Spouse: Indravarman III
- Father: Jayavarman VIII

Srindrabhupesvarachuda (13th-century – 14th-century), was a princess and queen of the Khmer Empire, married to king Indravarman III of the Khmer Empire (r. 1295–1308).

She was the eldest daughter of king Jayavarman VIII. She married Indravarman III, who succeeded her father when he abdicated in 1295. An inscription notes that they were crowned:

"The Highness Sri Srindravarmandeva, lined from the country of Srestavarmanvaya and the country of Srindrapura Krtajnapura, was crowned as Yuvaraja (heir) with the highness Sri Srindrabhupesvarcuda who was the daughter of the king as spouse, under the reign of the Highness Jayavarmandeva Paramesvarapada."

Queen Srindrabhupesvarachuda is most known for the role she played in the succession of her spouse to the throne. Reportedly, she had a brother who was originally intended to succeed to the throne, but she convinced her father to deprive her brother of the succession and instead give it to her spouse by right of marriage, and her father:

"devoted as he was to his daughter, gave her the chance to steal the golden sword of office and give it to her husband, thus depriving her brother of the succession. This brother strove to stir the soldiery to revolt, but the king, hearing of this, cut off his brother-in-law's toes and threw him into a dark dungeon."
