= Prasat Baksei Chamkrong =

Baksei Chamkrong
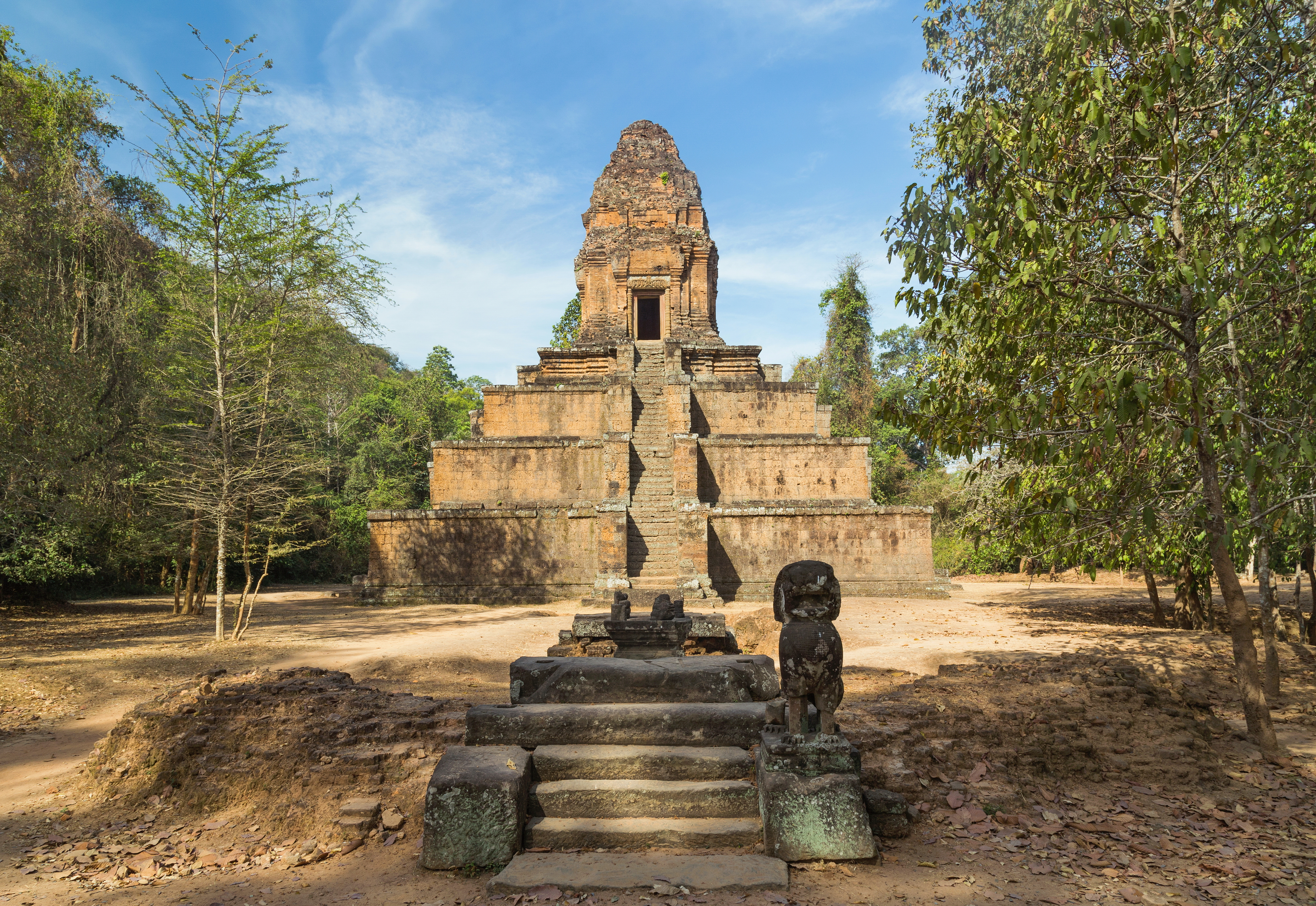
- The temple mountain of Baksei Chamkrong

- Location in Cambodia

Religion
- Affiliation: Hinduism
- Province: Siem Reap
- Deity: Shiva

Location
- Location: Angkor
- Country: Cambodia
- Interactive map of Baksei Chamkrong
- Coordinates: 13.4253122°N 103.8581318°E

Architecture
- Type: Khmer (Bakheng to Koh Ker style)
- Creator: Harshavarman I, restored by Rajendravarman II
- Completed: 968

Specifications
- Temple: 1 tower
- Elevation: 13 m (43 ft)

Baksei Chamkrong (/ˈbækseɪ ˌtʃæmkrɒŋ/; Khmer: ប្រាសាទបក្សីចាំក្រុង, Prasat Băksei Chămkrŏng, pronounced [ɓaksəj camkroŋ]) is a small hindu temple located in the Angkor complex (Siem Reap, Cambodia). It is dedicated to Shiva and used to hold a golden image of him. The temple can be seen on the left side when entering Angkor Thom at the southern gate. It was dedicated to Yasovarman by his son, King Harshavarman I. The temple was completed by Rajendravarman II (944–968).

== Name ==
The name "Baksei Chamkrong" means "The Bird Who Shelters Under Its Wings" and comes from a legend. In it, the king tried to flee Angkor during a siege and then a huge bird landed and sheltered him under its wings.

== Description ==
This temple is one of the first temples constructed of durable material such as bricks and laterite and with decoration in sandstone. A brick enclosure originally surrounded the pyramid with a stone gopura on the east side is now almost completely disappeared. Much of the stucco on the surface of the temple has vanished. The main sandstone lintel is decorated with a fine carving of Indra standing on his three-headed elephant Airavata. Garlands emanate from either side of Indra in the style current to the monument. There is an inscription on either side of the small doorway which detail the dedication and praises the early Khmer kings from Jayavarman II onward as well as earlier legendary kings, including the ancestor of the nation, the hermit Kambu.

The pyramid measures 27 metres across at the base and 15 at the summit for an overall height of 13 metres. Four stairway reach the summit at the cardinal points. The brick sanctuary tower, eight meters square on a sandstone base open to the east with the usual blind doors on the other sides.

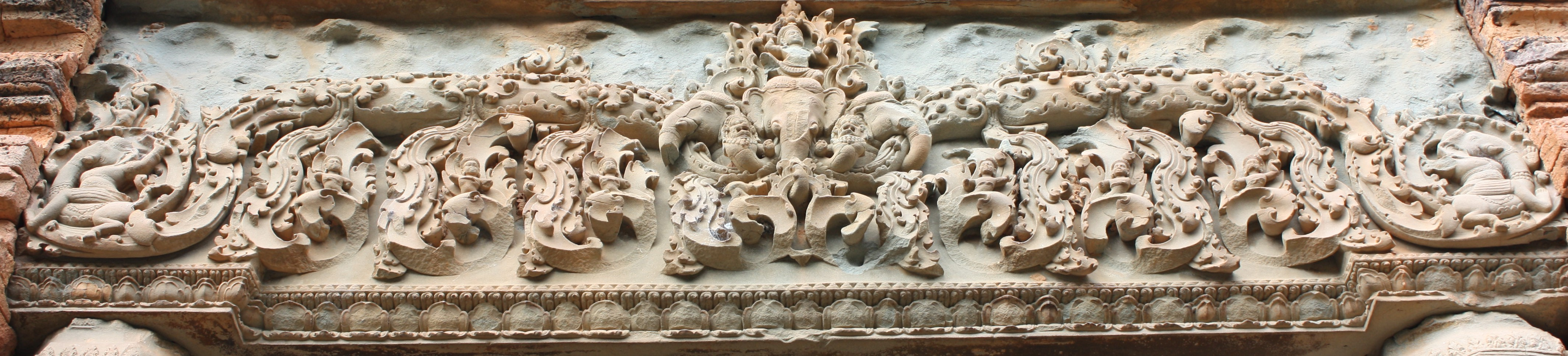
Indra on Airavata, with Ganesh riding his trunk on either side, at Baksei Chamkrong, Siem Reap, Cambodia

== Gallery ==
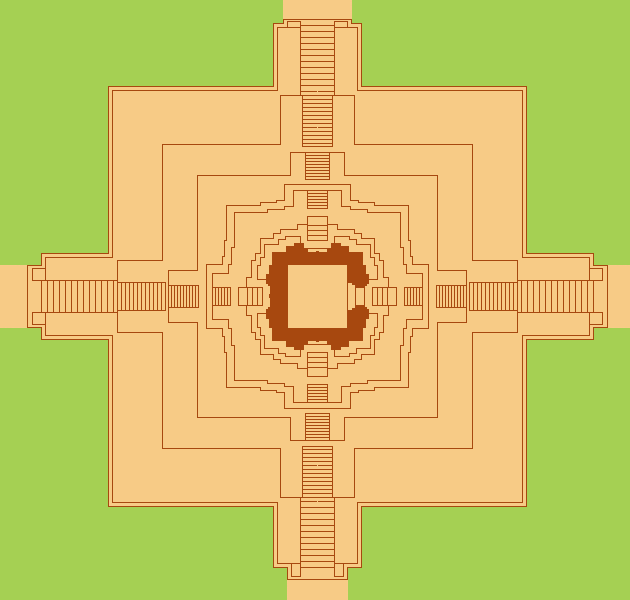
Layout

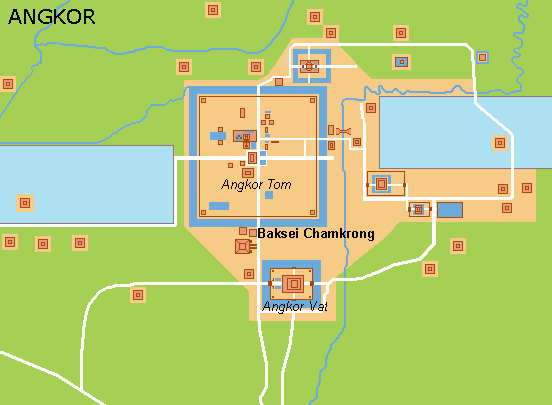
Location at Angkor Thom

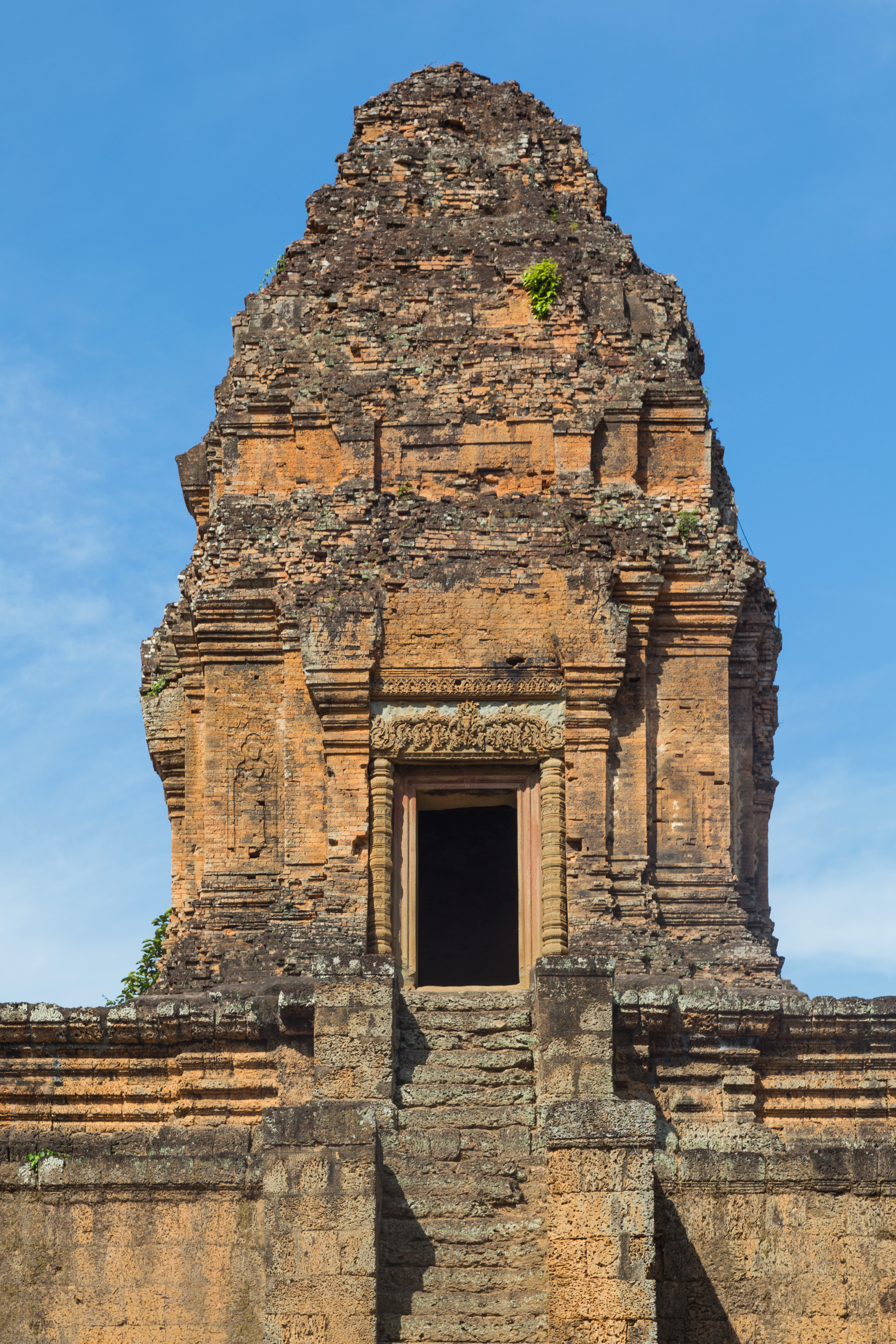
Tower

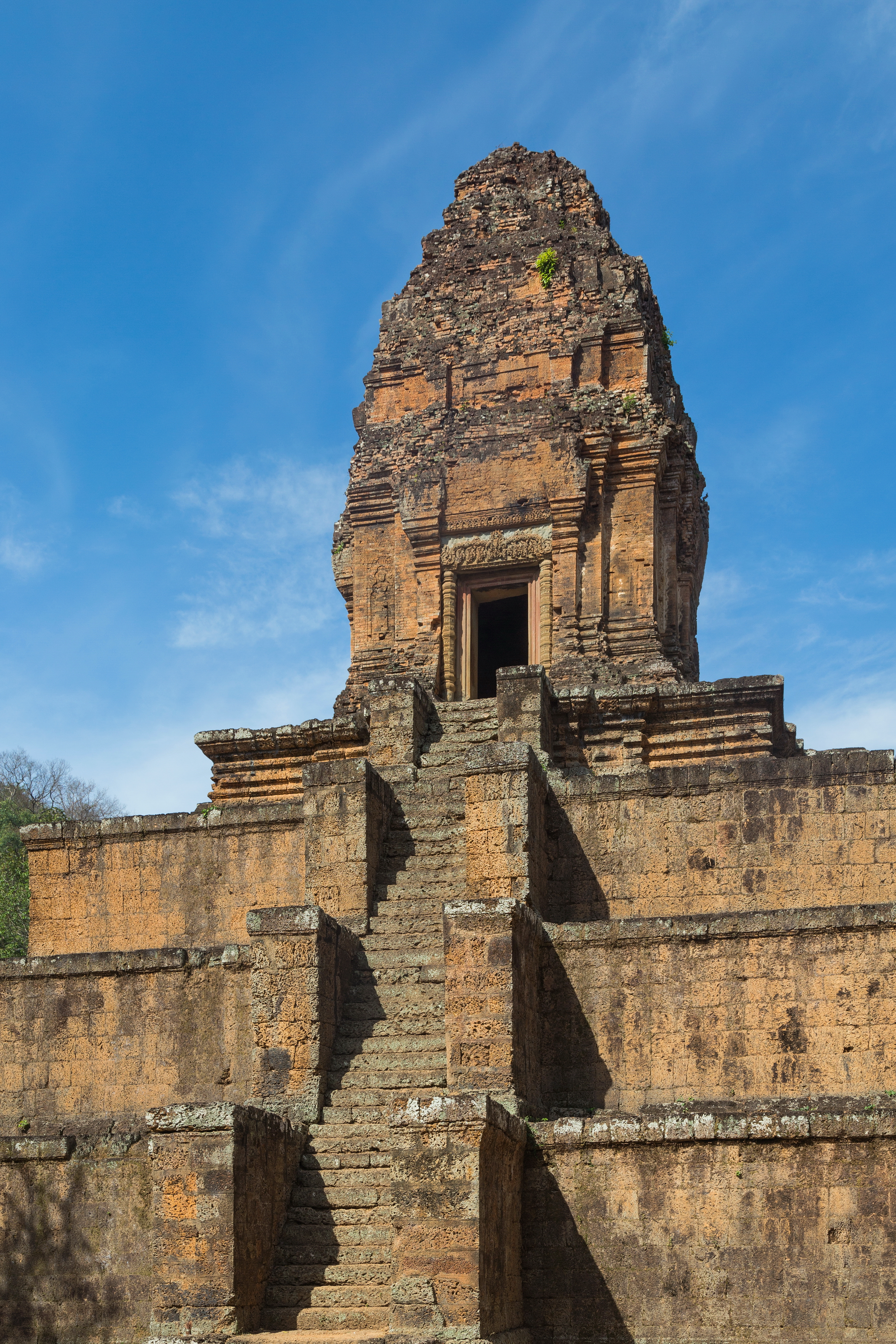
Temple entrance

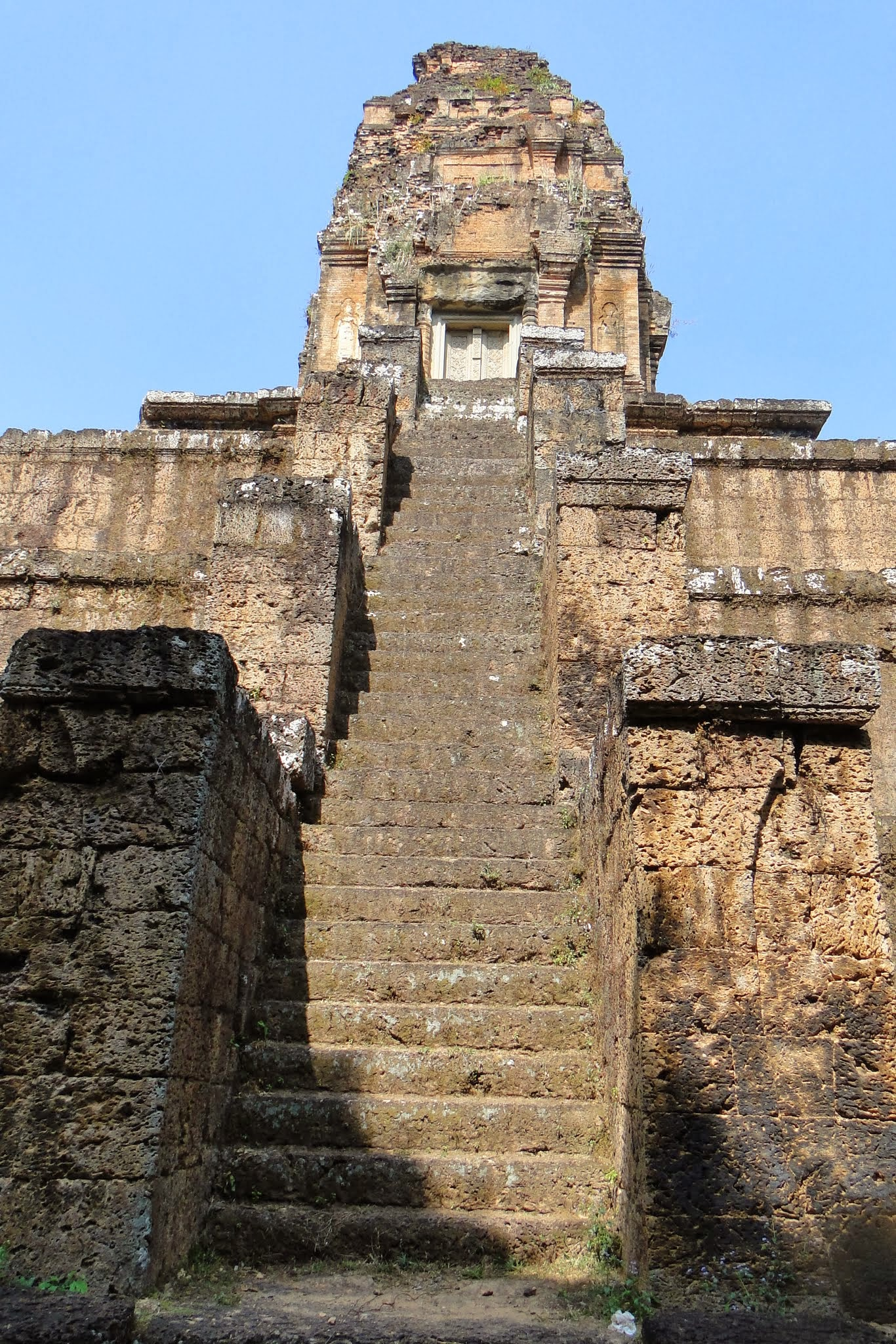
Stairs

== See also ==
- Phnom Bakheng
- Prasat Bei
- Thma Bay Kaek
