= 928 =

Calendar year

928 in various calendars
- Gregorian calendar: 928; CMXXVIII
- Ab urbe condita: 1681
- Armenian calendar: 377; ԹՎ ՅՀԷ
- Assyrian calendar: 5678
- Balinese saka calendar: 849–850
- Bengali calendar: 334–335
- Berber calendar: 1878
- Buddhist calendar: 1472
- Burmese calendar: 290
- Byzantine calendar: 6436–6437
- Chinese calendar: 丁亥年 (Fire Pig); 3625 or 3418 — to — 戊子年 (Earth Rat); 3626 or 3419
- Coptic calendar: 644–645
- Discordian calendar: 2094
- Ethiopian calendar: 920–921
- Hebrew calendar: 4688–4689
- Hindu calendars
- Vikram Samvat: 984–985
- Shaka Samvat: 849–850
- Kali Yuga: 4028–4029
- Holocene calendar: 10928
- Iranian calendar: 306–307
- Islamic calendar: 315–316
- Japanese calendar: Enchō 6 (延長６年)
- Javanese calendar: 827–828
- Julian calendar: 928; CMXXVIII
- Korean calendar: 3261
- Minguo calendar: 984 before ROC 民前984年
- Nanakshahi calendar: −540
- Seleucid era: 1239/1240 AG
- Thai solar calendar: 1470–1471
- Tibetan calendar: མེ་མོ་ཕག་ལོ་ (female Fire-Boar); 1054 or 673 or −99 — to — ས་ཕོ་བྱི་བ་ལོ་ (male Earth-Rat); 1055 or 674 or −98

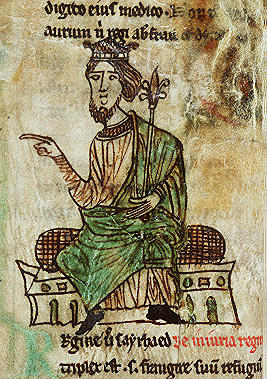
King Hywel Dda (the Good) (c. 880–950)

Year 928 (CMXXVIII) was a leap year starting on Tuesday of the Julian calendar.

== Events ==
=== By place ===
==== Europe ====
- King Rudolph I loses the support of Herbert II, count of Vermandois, who controls the prison at Péronne in which former King Charles III (the Simple) is imprisoned. Herbert brings him before William I (Longsword), count of Rouen, for homage and then to Rheims as leverage to blackmail Rudolph to make him cede sovereignty over Laon (Northern France).
- June 5 – Louis III (the Blind), former king of Provence (Lower Burgundy), dies at Arles after a 27-year reign (of which 23 are sightless). He is succeeded by his brother-in-law Hugh I who is King of Italy. With the approval of his kinsman Rudolph I, Hugh strips Louis's son and heir, Charles Constantine, of his inheritance and proclaims himself as ruler of Provence.
- Winter – King Henry I (the Fowler) subdues the Polabian Slavs who live on the eastern borders. He then marches against the Slavic Hevelli tribes and seizes their capital, Brandenburg. Henry invades the Glomacze lands in the middle Elbe valley, where he besieges and destroys the main castle called Gana (the later Albrechtsburg) at Meissen (Saxony).

==== Britain ====
- King Hywel Dda (the Good) of Deheubarth makes a pilgrimage to Rome, he becomes the first Welsh ruler to undertake such a trip. Hywel begins the codification of medieval Welsh law and mints his own coinage.

==== Italy ====
- Summer – A Fatimid fleet under Sabir al-Fata raids Byzantine southern Italy. It captures a locality named al-Ghiran ('the caves') in Apulia and sacks the cities of Taranto and Otranto. The inhabitants are carried off to North Africa as slaves.

==== Asia ====
- Ishanavarman II dies after a 5-year reign and is succeeded by his uncle Jayavarman IV as king of the Khmer Empire (modern Cambodia). He moves the capital north from Angkor to Koh Ker.
- Mount Merapi erupts, causing the population of Java to move east.

=== By topic ===
==== Religion ====
- Summer – Pope John X is deposed and imprisoned in Castel Sant'Angelo at Rome by order of the Roman senatrix Marozia after a 14-year reign. He is succeeded by Leo VI as the 123rd pope of the Catholic Church.
- Leo VI abolishes the Nin Bishopric and transfers bishop Gregory (Croatian: Grgur Ninski) to Skradin. This ends the long running dispute between the Split and Nin Bishoprics in the Croatian kingdom.
- July 18 – Tryphon succeeds Stephen II as patriarch of Constantinople (until 931).

== Births ==
- August 14 – Qian Hongzuo, king of Wuyue (d. 947)
- Dub mac Maíl Coluīm, king of Scotland (d. 967)
- Pietro I Orseolo, doge of Venice (d. 987)
- Qian Hongzong, king of Wuyue (d. 971)
- Shi Shouxin, Chinese general (d. 984)

== Deaths ==
- January 20 – Zhao Guangfeng, Chinese official and chancellor
- June 5 – Louis the Blind, Frankish king and Holy Roman Emperor
- July 18 – Stephen II, patriarch of Constantinople
- November 8 – Duan Ning, Chinese general
- Al-Layth ibn Ali ibn al-Layth, Saffarid emir
- Diogo Fernandes, count of Portugal
- Huo Yanwei, Chinese general (b. 872)
- Ishanavarman II, king of the Khmer Empire
- John X, pope of the Catholic Church
- Siyahchashm, Justanid ruler (mahdi)
- Tomislav, duke and king of Croatia
- Wang, empress dowager of Wu
- Yusuf ibn Abi'l-Saj, Sajid emir
- Zhang Juhan, Chinese official (b. 858)
