= Thma Bay Kaek =

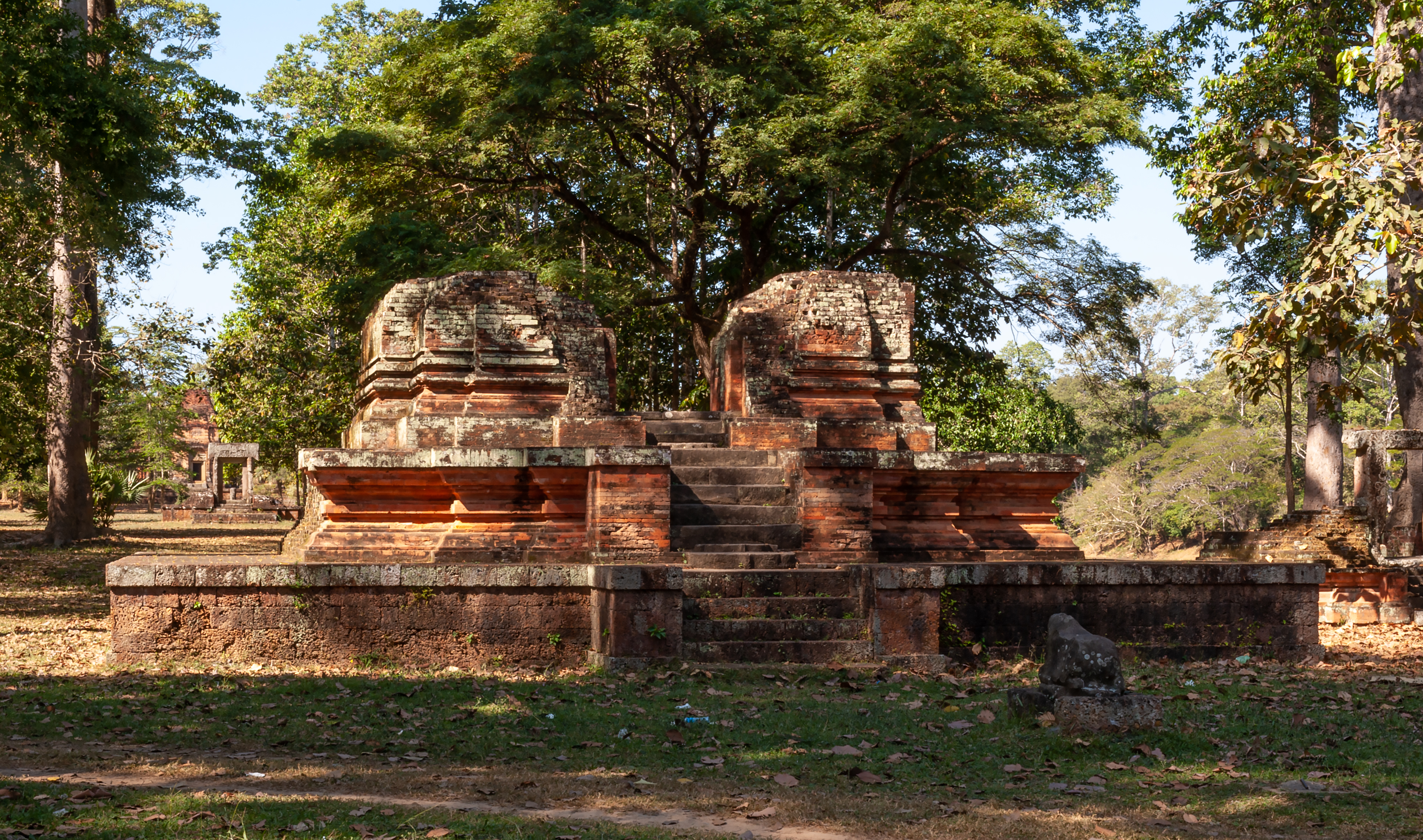
- The ruin of the temple

- Location within Cambodia

Religion
- Affiliation: Hinduism
- Province: Siem Reap
- Deity: Shiva

Location
- Location: Angkor
- Country: Cambodia
- Interactive map of Thma Bay Kaek
- Coordinates: 13°25′34″N 103°51′29″E

Architecture
- Type: Khmer (Bakheng style)
- Creator: Yasovarman I
- Completed: 10th century AD

Thma Bay Kaek (Khmer: ប្រាសាទថ្មបាយក្អែក) is located at Angkor in Cambodia. It consists of the ruins of a square brick tower facing east and is preceded by a laterite terrace. This is all that remains of this temple which must be one of many that originally surrounded the Bakheng. A sacred treasure consisting of five gold leaves arranged in a quincunx, the central leaf of which carried the image of Nandi, was found here.

== See also ==
- Baksei Chamkrong
- Phnom Bakheng
- Prasat Bei
