= Cheung Ang temple =

Cambodian temple

Coordinates: 11.8806°N 105.8066°E

Cheung Ang temple or Prasat Cheung Ang (Khmer: ប្រាសាទជើងអង) is a brick building of the time of the Khmer Empire in Kampong Cham Province, Cambodia.

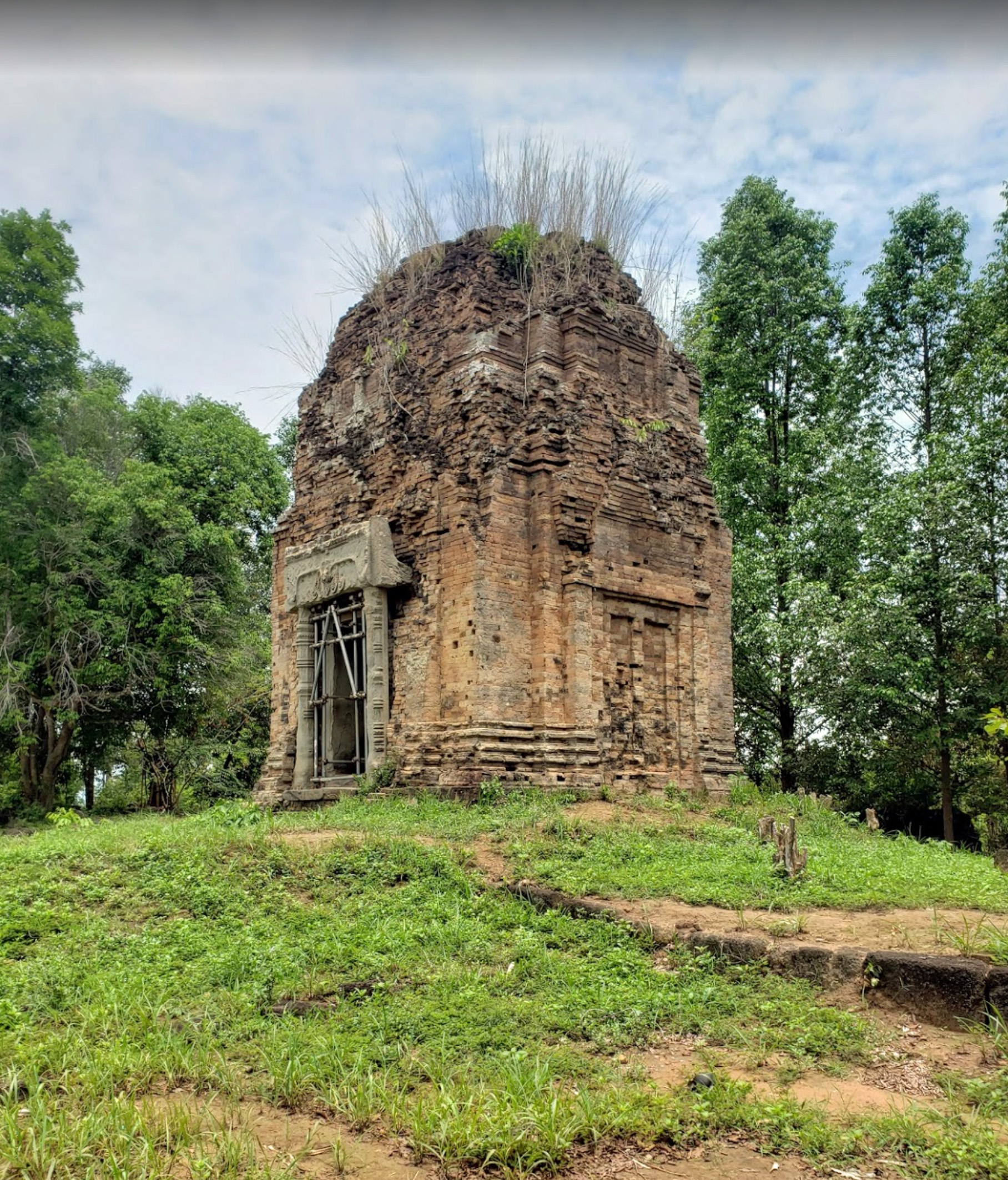
Prasat Cheung Ang, Cambodia. Temple from the north east.

== Location ==
Prasat Cheung Ang is set in the middle of a square moat, following the standard configuration of mature Khmer temples. The building is oriented toward the east, with a large tank on the eastern side. It is 10 km north-east of the historic city site of Prey Nokor (ancient Indrapura).

== Temple ==
The temple is brick-built with projecting buttresses and false doors on the west, north and south. The eastern door has a stone frame with ornamental pillars and an elaborately carved lintel. The inner door jambs are smooth and carry inscriptions. These give a date of 932 CE (Śaka year 854) and thus a date for the building. The building was originally dedicated to Shiva but now houses a Buddha image.

== Inscriptions ==
The inscriptions on the inner jambs are termed K.99 according to the generally accepted numbering system for Khmer records. The records, in Sanskrit and Old Khmer, were published by Georges Cœdès in 1954. More recently, the inscriptions have been studied and published online by Philip Jenner. The inscription and other relevant data can be studied online in the SIDDHAM network where the text, translation and other information are collected.

The inscriptions at Prasat Cheung Ang record an order from the Khmer king Jayavarman IV to combine the revenues of two different temples of Śiva: Śrī Tribhuvanaikanātha and Śrī Cāmpeśvara. Additional provisions, including slaves, are also assigned to Śrī Cāmpeśvara.
