= Prasat Kravan =

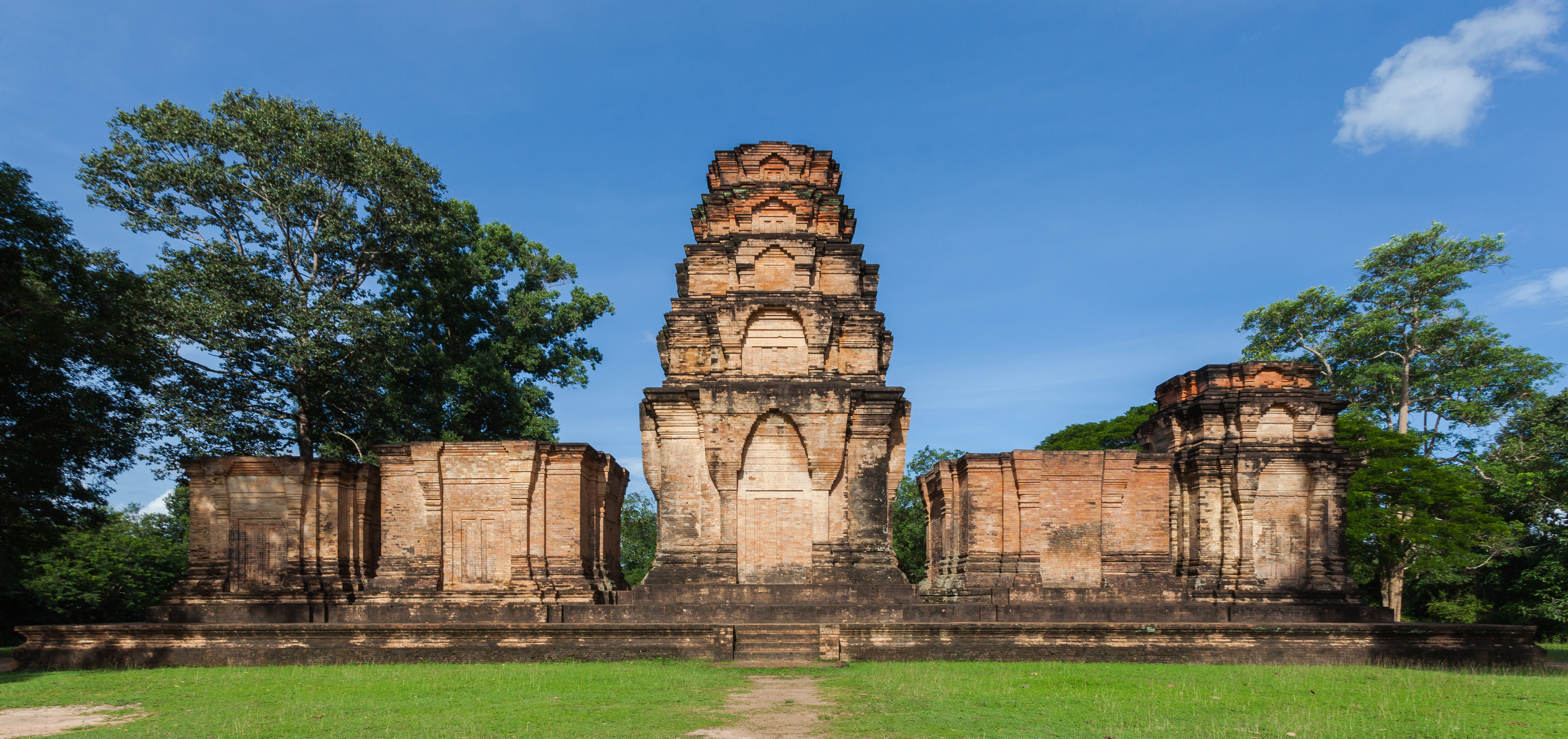

- Location in Cambodia

Religion
- Affiliation: Hinduism
- Deity: Vishnu

Location
- Location: Angkor, south of the Srah Srang baray
- Country: Cambodia
- Interactive map of Prasat Kravan
- Coordinates: 13°25′11″N 103°53′59″E

Architecture
- Type: Early Angkorian
- Creator: High officials under Harshavarman I or Ishanavarman II
- Completed: 921

Prasat Kravan (Khmer: ប្រាសាទក្រវាន់) is a small 10th-century temple consisting of five reddish brick towers on a common terrace, at Angkor, Cambodia, south of the artificial lake (baray) called Srah Srang. Its original Sanskrit name is unknown. The modern name in Khmer, "Prasat Kravan", means artabotrys odoratissimus temple. The temple was dedicated to Vishnu in 921 CE, according to an inscription on doorjambs.

The site was cleaned from vegetation in the 1930s by Henri Marchal and Georges Trouvé. Afterwards the towers were restored on Bernard Philippe Groslier's initiative from 1962 to 1966, adding some new bricks which are marked with a "CA" (meaning "Conservation Angkor").

The temple is oriented to the east and surrounded by a small moat. Its exterior is striking for its classical lines and symmetry. The central and the south tower have superstructures which take advantage of false perspective by simple means of diminishing tiers. The sanctuary's interiors are remarkable for the large bas-relief depictions of Vishnu and Lakshmi that have been carved into the walls of reddish brick, connected by a vegetable compound. This type of sculptured artwork is rather common in Cham temples, but rare in known Khmer monuments.

== Bas-reliefs ==
The bas-reliefs on the interior walls of the central tower are representations of Vishnu. There are three in all:

- Four-armed Vishnu sits astride his vehicle Garuda and holding his standard appurtenances: the globe, the conch, the discus, and the baton.
- Four-armed Vishnu, again holding his four standard appurtenances, takes a large step. This image illustrates the story of Vishnu in his incarnation as Vamana the dwarf taking three great steps to reclaim the world from the asura Bali.
- Eight-armed Vishnu stands stiffly in the position of a statue. He is surrounded by hundreds of tiny devotees and surmounted by a crocodile or a lizard. Its significance remains unknown.

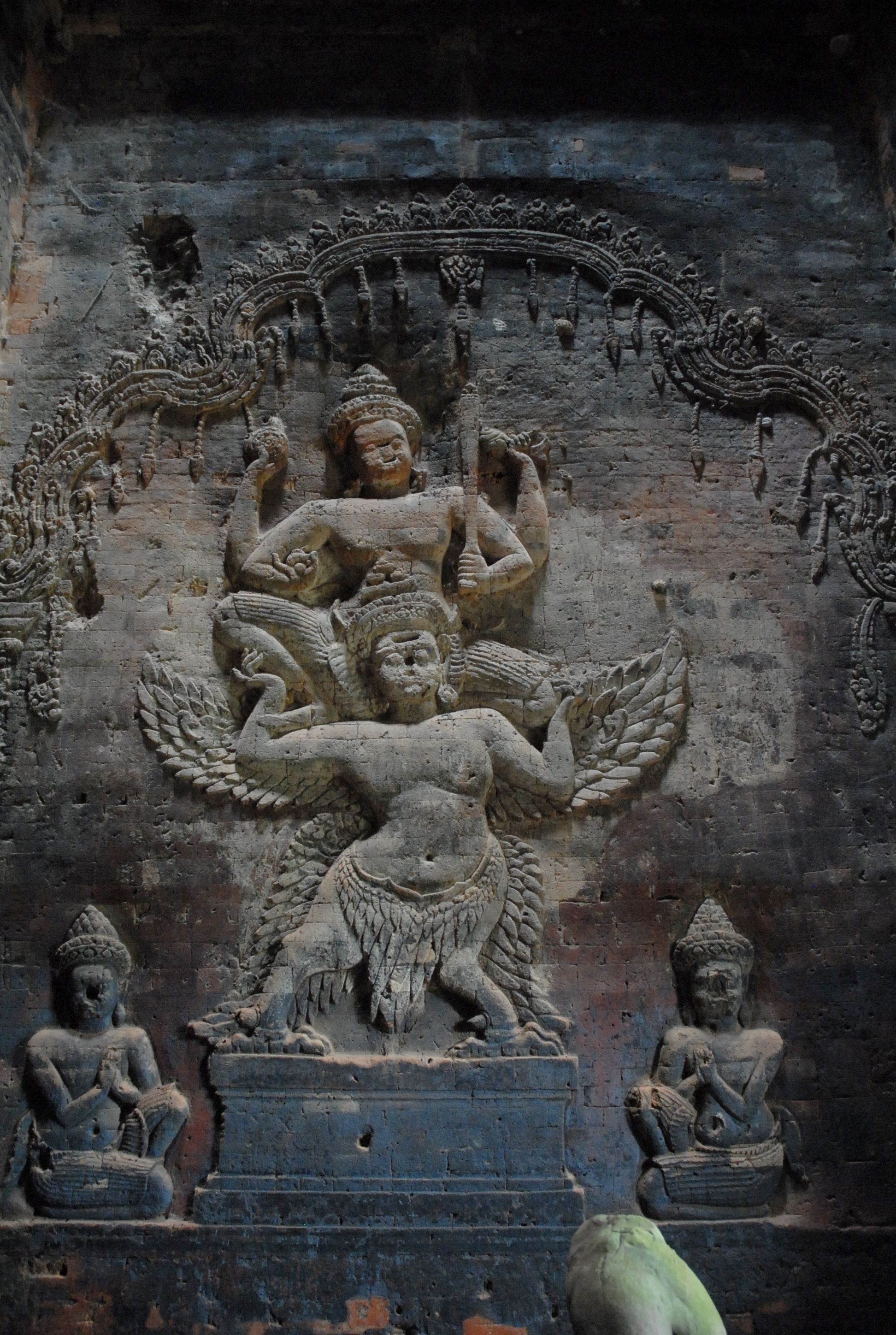
Relief of Vishnu on garuda carved directly out of the brick walls.

The interior walls of the northernmost tower feature a pair of bas-reliefs of Lakshmi, Vishnu's consort, flanked by devotees:

- In one of the depictions, the goddess holds the trident of Shiva and the discus of Vishnu, possibly marking her as the great goddess who transcends the duality of Saiva and Vaishnava worship.
- A more traditional depiction of Lakshmi holding lotuses is on the opposite wall.

== Gallery ==
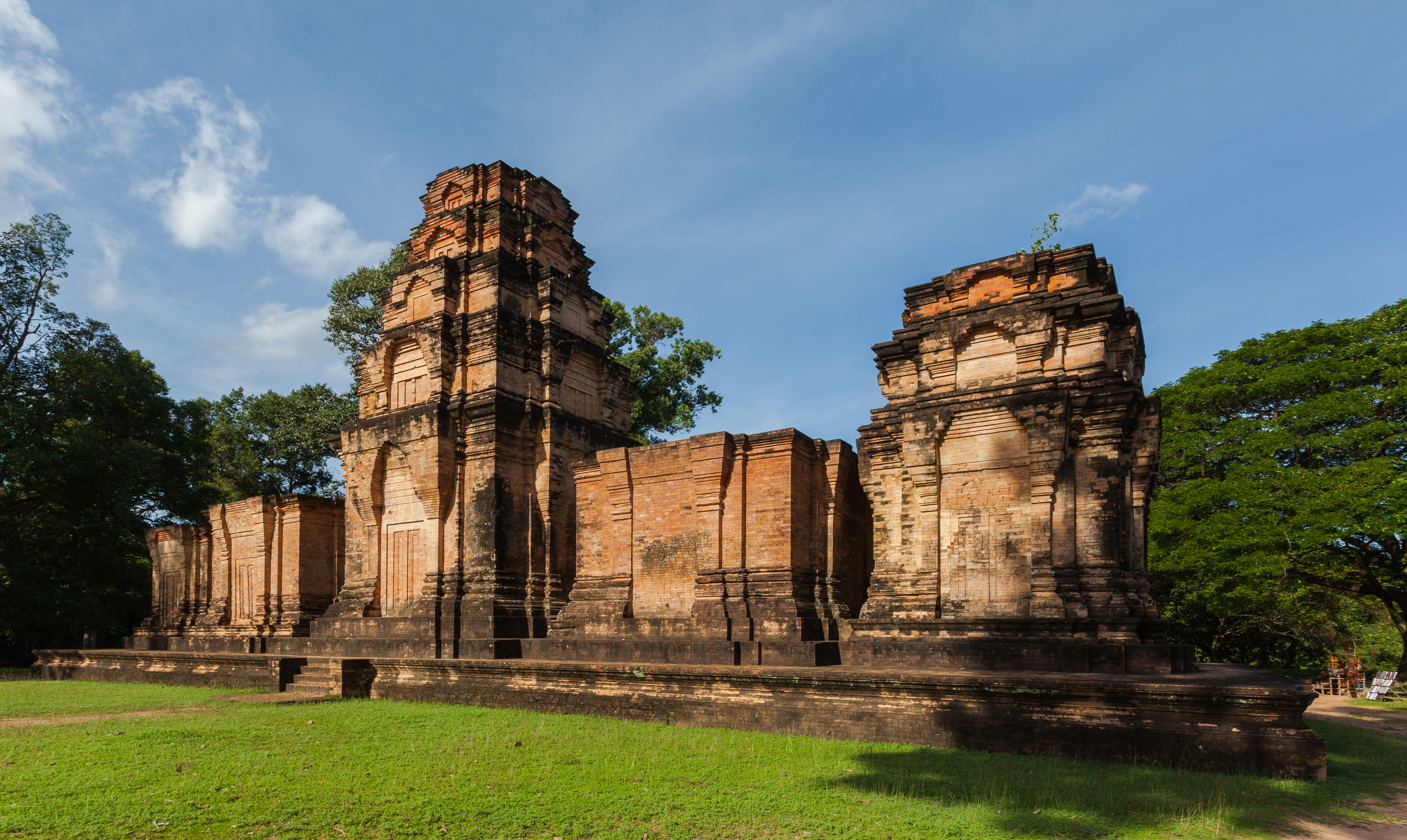

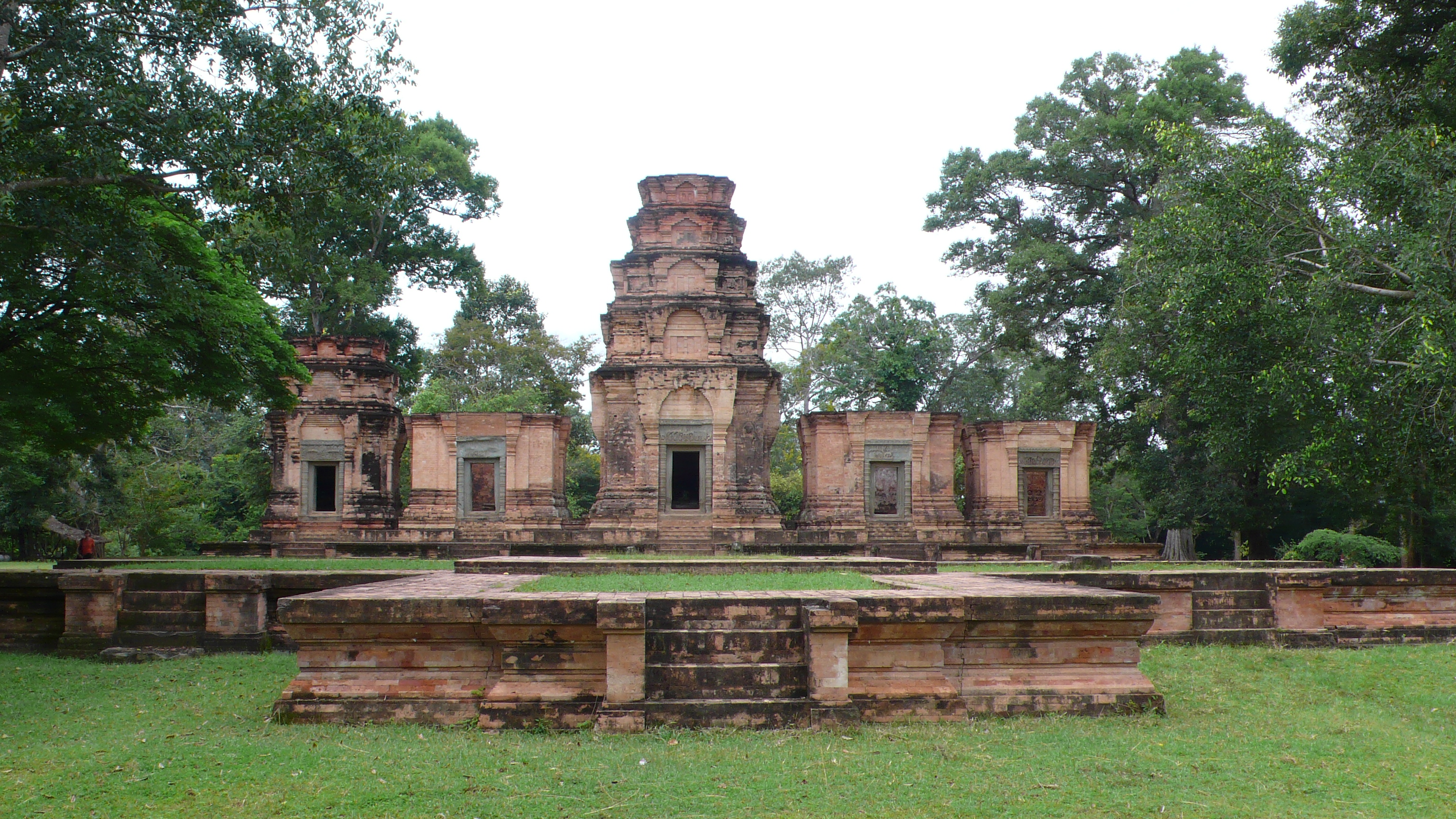

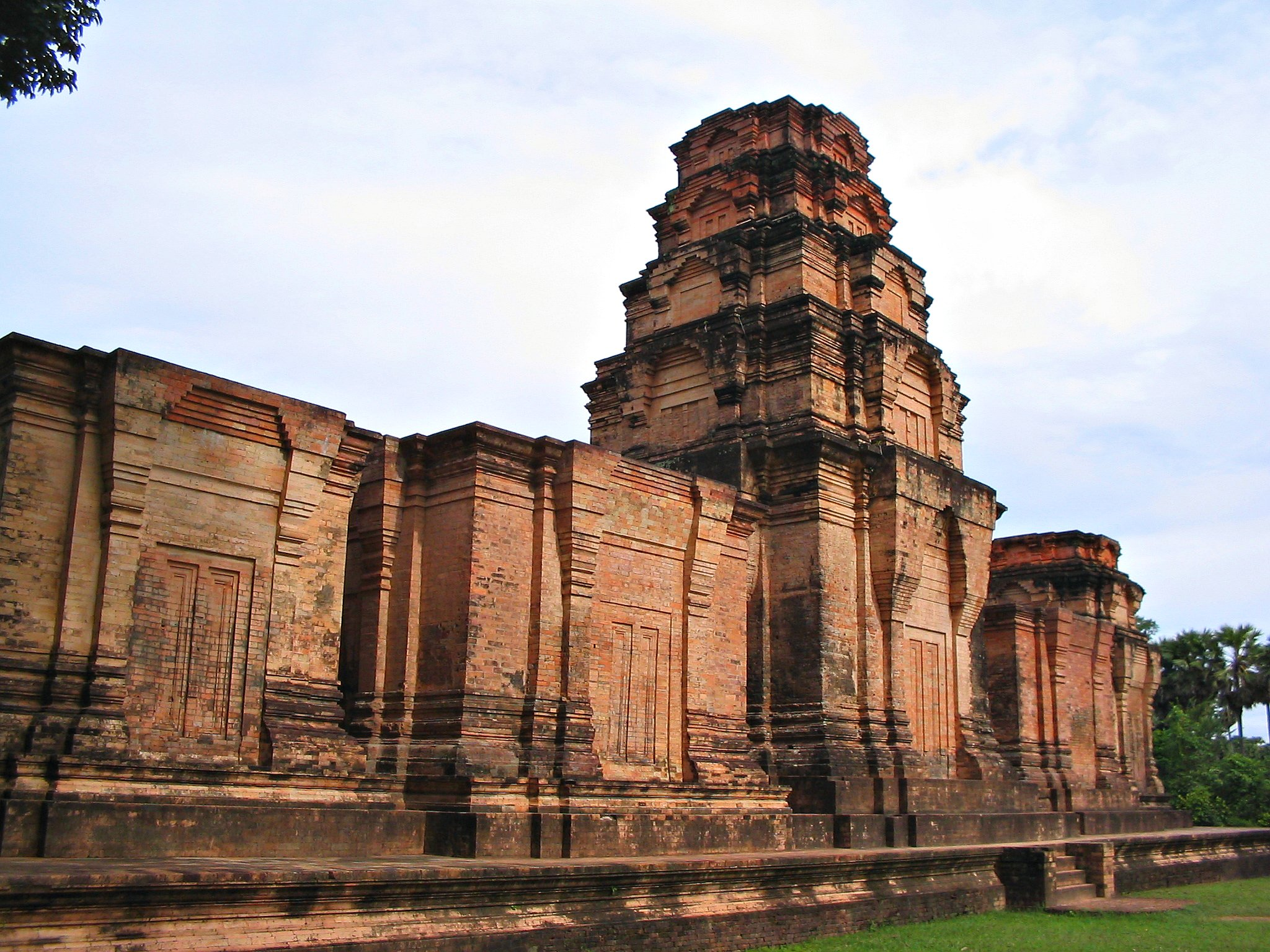

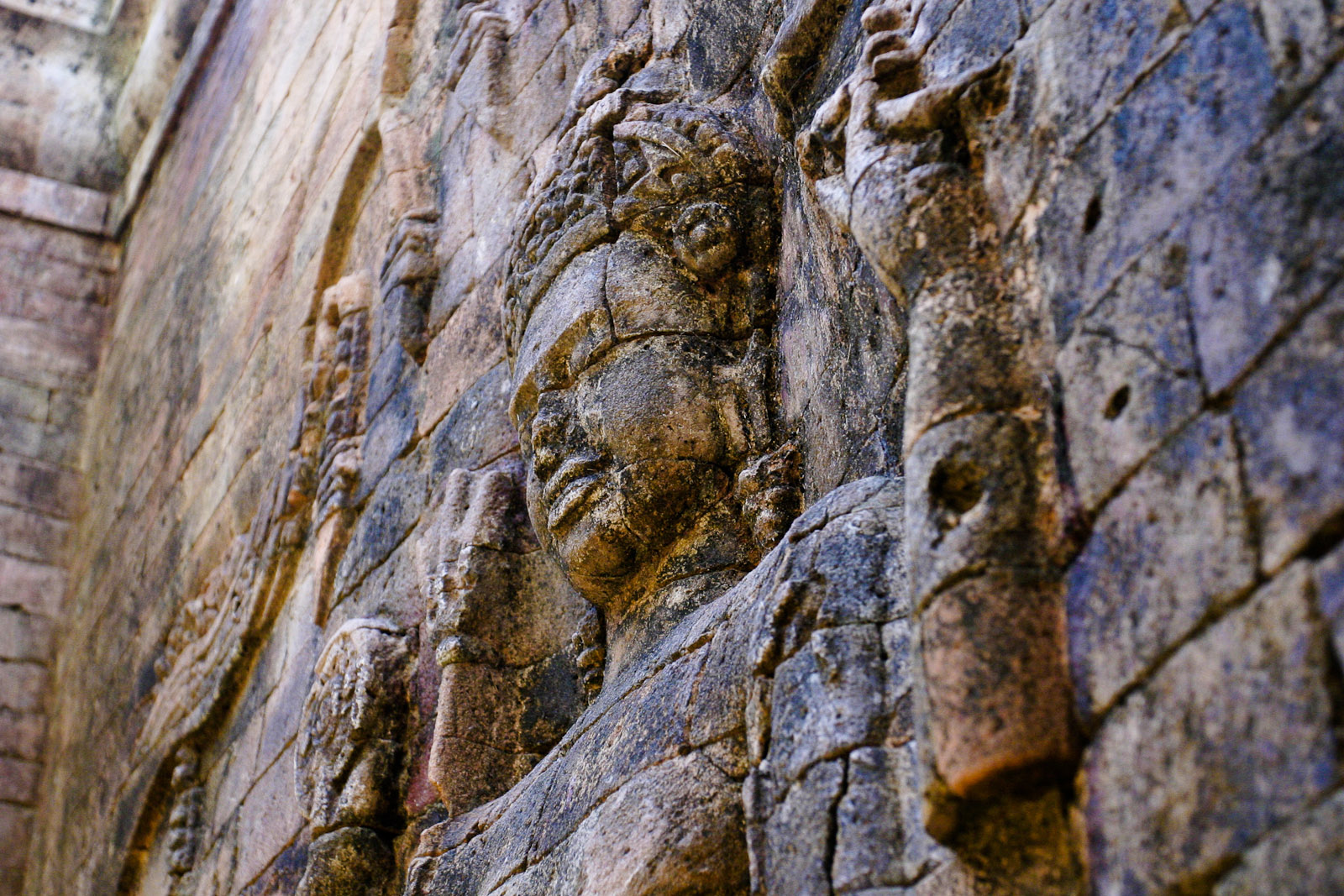

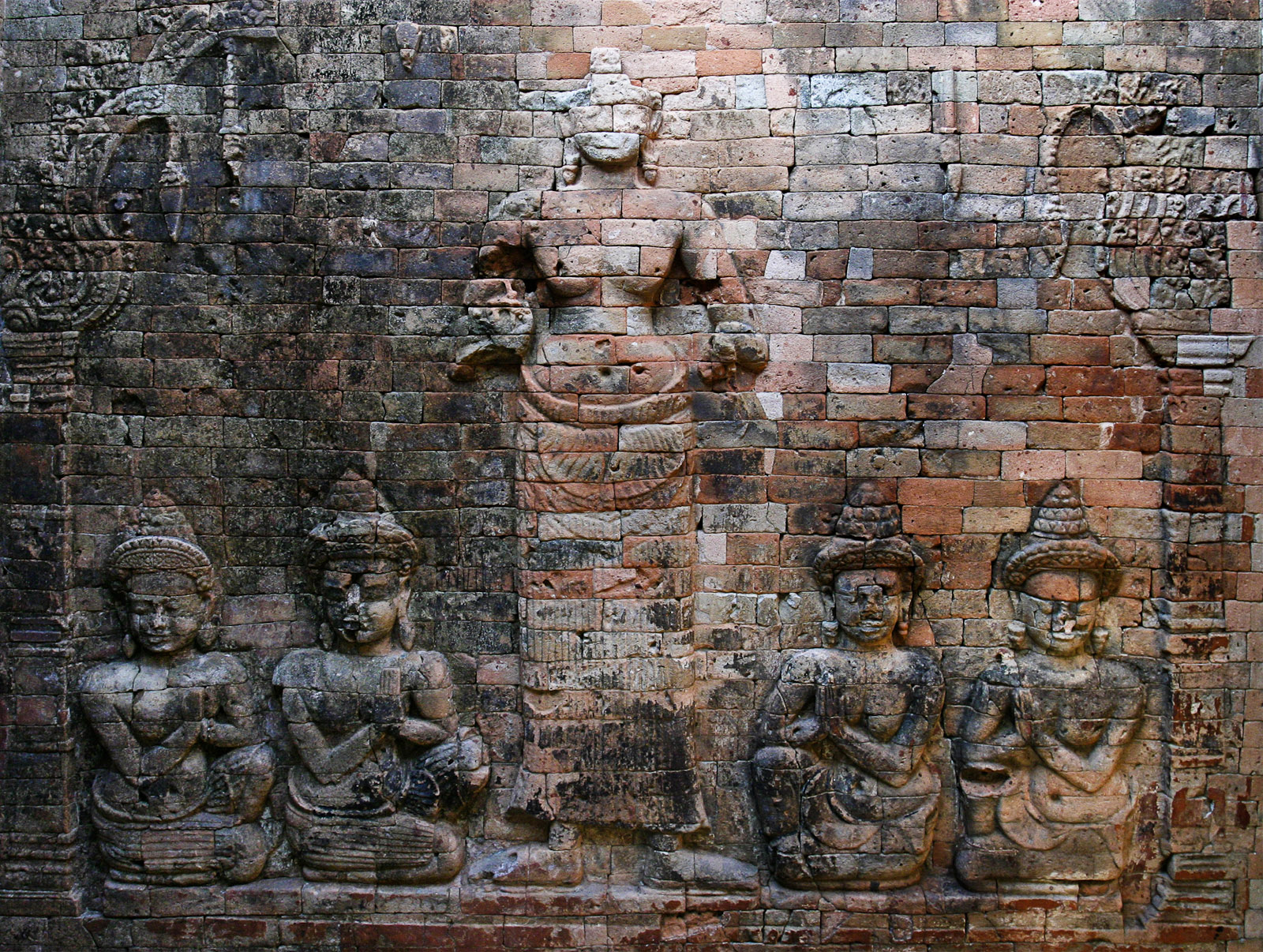

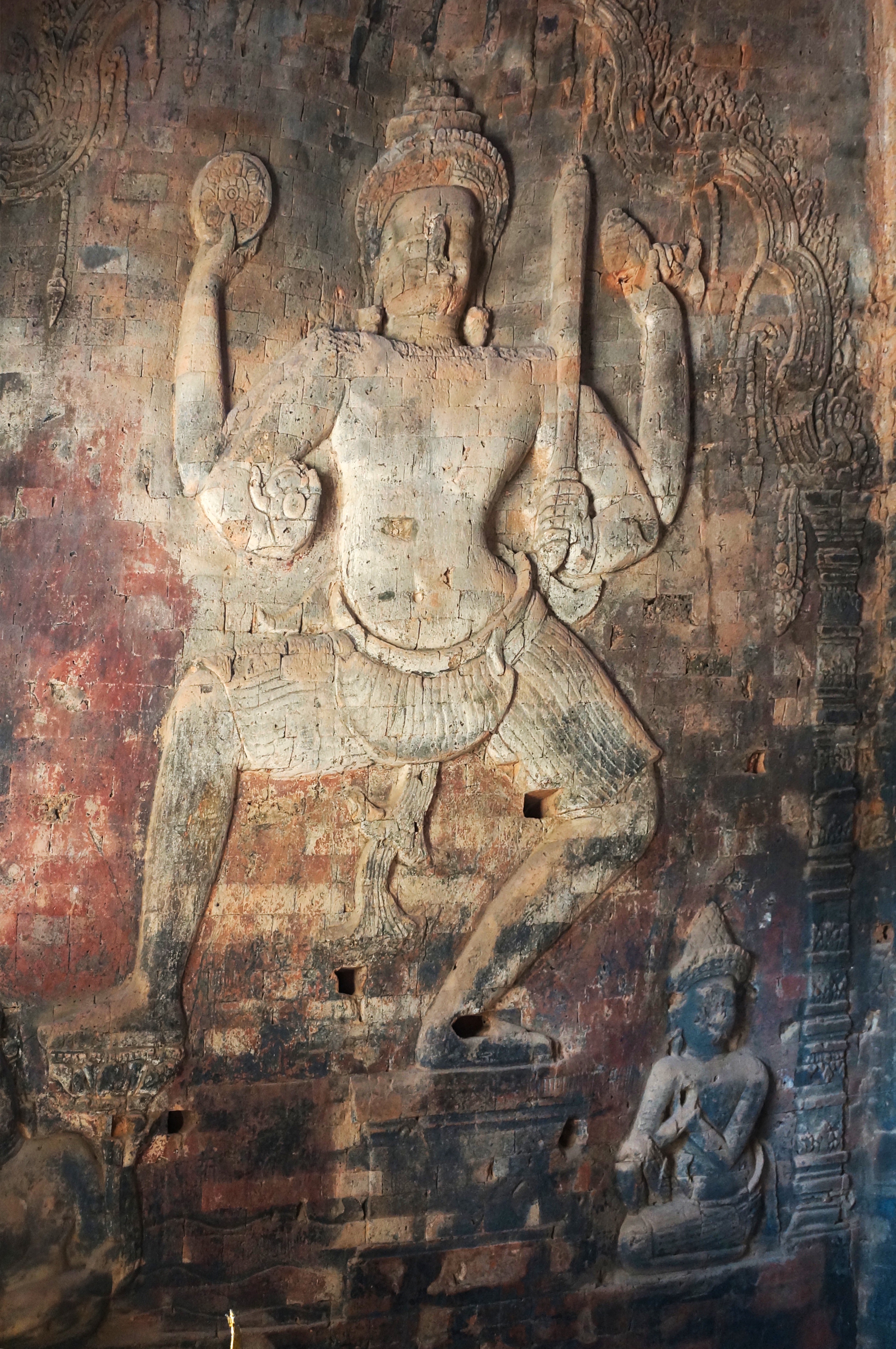

== Notes ==
- Freeman, Michael; Jacques, Claude (2006). Ancient Angkor. River Books. ISBN 974-8225-27-5.
- Glaize, Maurice (2003) [1993, First published 1944]. Tremmel, Nils (ed.). The Monuments of the Angkor Group (PDF) (based on the 4th ed.).
