= Koh Ker =

Capital of the Khmer Empire

- កោះកេរ្តិ៍ (Khmer)
- Lingapura
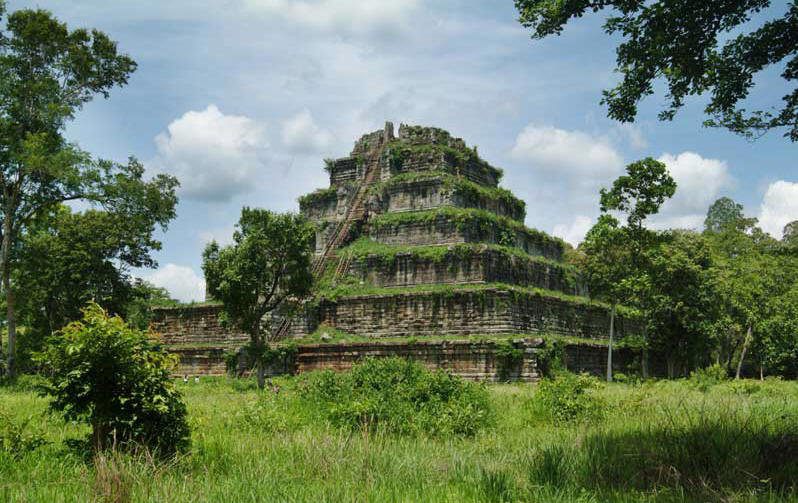
- Prasat Thom of Koh Ker temple site

- Location in Cambodia
- 13°46′30″N 104°32′50″E
- Type: Archaeological site
- Periods: Post-classical
- Location: Preah Vihear, Cambodia
- Region: Southeast Asia

History
- Built: 921 AD
- Built by: Jayavarman IV

Site notes
- Material: brick, sandstone, laterite
- Architectural styles: Khmer, Koh Ker style
- Condition: Ruined
- Public access: Yes

UNESCO World Heritage Site
- Official name: Koh Ker: Archaeological Site of Ancient Lingapura or Chok Gargyar
- Type: Cultural
- Criteria: ii, iv
- Designated: 2023 (45th session)
- Reference no.: 1667
- Region: Southeast Asia

Koh Ker (Khmer: ប្រាសាទកោះកេរ្ដិ៍, Prasat Kaôh Kértĕ [praːsaːt kɑh keː]) is a remote archaeological site in northern Cambodia about 120 kilometres (75 mi) away from Siem Reap and the ancient site of Angkor. It is a jungle filled region that is sparsely populated. More than 180 sanctuaries were found in a protected area of 81 square kilometres (31 sq mi). Only about two dozen monuments can be visited by tourists because most of the sanctuaries are hidden in the forest and the whole area is not fully demined.

Koh Ker is the modern name for an important city of the Khmer empire. In inscriptions the town is mentioned as Lingapura (city of lingams) or Chok Gargyar (translated as city of glance, or as iron tree forest).

Under the reign of the kings Jayavarman IV and Harshavarman II Koh Ker was briefly the capital of the whole empire (928–944 AD). Jayavarman IV enforced an ambitious building program. An enormous water-tank and about forty temples were constructed under his rule. The most significant temple‑complex, a double sanctuary (Prasat Thom/Prang), follows a linear plan and not a concentric one like most of the temples of the Khmer kings. Unparalleled is the 36-metre (118 ft)-high seven‑tiered pyramid, which most probably served as state temple of Jayavarman IV. Also impressive are the shrines with the two‑meter 6 ft 7 in high lingas.

Under Jayavarman IV, the style of Koh Ker was developed and the art of sculpture reached a pinnacle. A great variety of statues were chiseled. Because of its remoteness, the site of Koh Ker was plundered many times by looters. Sculptures of Koh Ker can be found not only in different museums, but also in private collections. Masterpieces of Koh Ker are offered occasionally at auctions. These pieces, in present times, are considered stolen art.

The site is about two and half hours away from Siem Reap, and guests can stay in the nearby village of Seyiong, 10 km from the temples where there are a number of guests houses. Travellers can also stay in Koh Ker Jungle Lodge Homestay, a sustainable tourism project built in the village of Koh Ker in 2009. The Koh Ker community in May 2019 open a basic wooden community rest house in the village.

The site of Koh Ker was inscribed on the UNESCO World Heritage List on 17 September 2023 during the 45th session of the World Heritage Committee in Riyadh, Saudi Arabia.

== Geography ==
Koh Ker is situated between the southern slopes of the Dangrek mountains, the Kulen mountains (Phnom Kulen) in the south-west, and the Tbeng mountain (Phnom Tbeng, near Tbeng Meanchey) in the east. Most parts of the hilly ground are covered by jungle, but most of the trees shed their leaves seasonally. The city of Koh Ker was on the most important strategic route of the Khmer empire. Coming from Angkor and Beng Mealea to Koh Ker this road led to the Preah Vihear temple and from there to Phimai in Thailand and Wat Phu in Laos . The region of Koh Ker is relatively dry. Numerous water-tanks and canals were built during the 9th and the 10th century to ensure the water supply. These days water is pumped up from a depth of 30 to 40 metres (98 to 131 ft).

== History ==
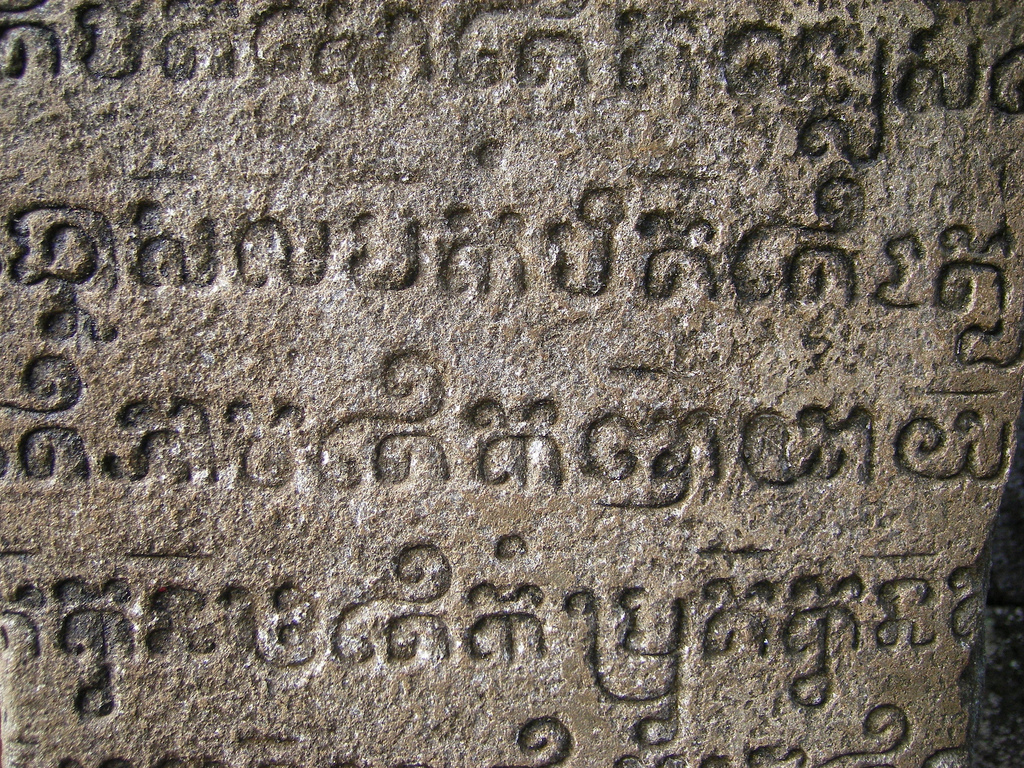
Ancient script from the ruins of Koh Ker

=== Jayavarman IV ===
Jayavarman IV ruled from 928 to 941 at Koh Ker. He was believed to have been the local king at this remote site, possibly his homeland, before he became king of the whole empire. That could explain why he had his residence at Koh Ker and not at Roluos (Hariharalaya) or at Yashodharapura (Angkor) like the kings before him. Some historians think that Jayavarman IV was a usurper; but, the majority of them believe that he was a legitimate ruler who could ascend to the throne because he married a half-sister of king Yasovarman I (889 – 900). What is certain is that the two sons of Yasovarman I (Harshavarman I, who ruled from 900 to 922 and Isanavarman II, who ruled from 922 to 925?) had no children. In the short time that Jayavarman IV reigned in Koh Ker, an ambitious building program was realised. That was only possible because of a restrictive system of raising taxes as seen on inscriptions found at the site. About 40 temples, the unique seven-tiered pyramid and a huge baray (water-reservoir) were built. Under Jayavarman IV, the Koh Ker-style was developed and the art of sculpture reached a pinnacle.

=== Harshavarman II ===
After the death of Jayavarman IV, the designated prince did not take his place. Harshavarman II (another son of Jayavarman IV) claimed the throne. Like his father, he ruled at Koh Ker (941 – 944) but after three years he died; likely not due to natural causes. None of the temples at Koh Ker can be ascribed to him. His follower on the throne, a cousin of his, returned Roluos (Hariharalaya) to the seat of power.

=== Koh Ker after 944 AD ===
Even after 944, as the capital of the Khmer Empire had changed back to the plains north of the Tonle Sap-lake, more temples were built at the site of Koh Ker. An inscription mentions the reign of Udayadityavarman I in 1001. At the beginning of the 13th century the last sanctuary was realised there. Under Jayavarman VII, the Prasat Andong Kuk, a so-called hospital-chapel, was built, one of more than 100 of hospital-sanctuaries built under this ruler.

== Modern History ==
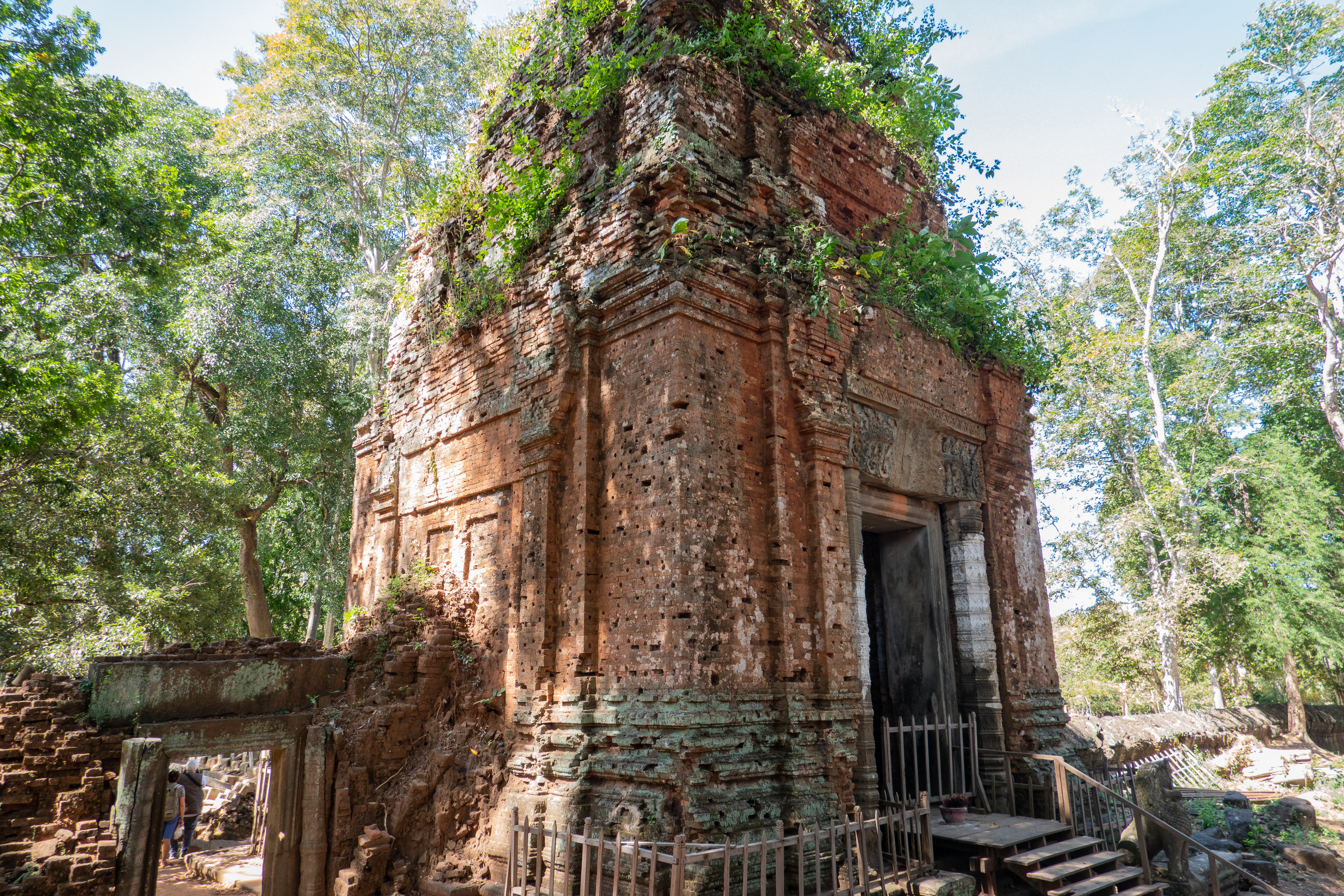
Tower at Koh Ker

=== 19th century ===
In the second part of the 19th century, French adventurers ranged the forests around the site of Koh Ker while hunting game. They brought word of the structures in the area back to France. The French researchers Lunet de Lajonquière and Étienne Aymonier came to Koh Ker. They saw the main temple-complex Prasat Thom/Prang, the Baray and a group of linga-shrines. They also discovered a few subsections of a chaussée (i.e. highway) with a breadth of more than 8 m (26 ft). They supposed that a road once connected Koh Ker with Wat Phu (today in southern Laos). Around 1880, members of a French expedition arrived at Koh Ker and looted numerous statues and reliefs. These pieces are now in the Musée Guimet in Paris.

=== 20th century ===
At the beginning of the 20th century, art historians realised that a full-fledged style was developed at Koh Ker. George Cœdès concluded from inscriptions that Koh Ker was capital of the Khmer empire (928 – 944 AD) under the reign of Jayavarman IV and his follower Harshavarman II. In the 1930s, again French researchers came to Koh Ker. They discovered numerous monuments and counted fifty sanctuaries in an area of 35 square kilometres (8,649 acres). Henry Parmentier made a number of drawings. After an interruption because of the reign of terror of the Khmer rouge, research at Koh Ker continued by APSARA, French, Japanese and Australian scientists.

=== 21st century ===
At the beginning of the 21st century, scientists concluded that not all of the monuments could have been built in the short time when Koh Ker was capital of the Khmer empire (928 – 944 AD). A new era started at Koh Ker as photographs made by satellites were analysed. In 2004 the protected area was extended to 81 square kilometres (31 sq mi; 20,016 acres). For five years, Japanese researchers explored and described 184 monuments, including documenting their exact locations. The Australian researcher Damian Evans and his team were able to verify Lajonquière's theory that there once was a Khmer route between Koh Ker and Wat Phu, probably the most important strategic road of the Khmer empire.

Excavations in December 2015 by Cambodian and international teams near Prasat Thom and the Rahal in the ancient urban core area of Koh Ker have yielded radiocarbon dates that clearly place significant habitation and activity beginning as early as the 7th-8th centuries CE - often noted as the Chenla period by historians. Some pottery types may date to the earlier Funan period. Over 24,000 artifacts and ecofacts were recovered from three test sites. Artifacts are mostly pottery fragments with local and exotic types representing over 1000 years of site use throughout the occupational sequence. Exotic pottery types include Chinese stoneware and glazed ware from the Song Yuan periods. Other exotic pottery include Thai and Vietnamese stoneware that generally date to the late Angkor and post-Angkor periods. Possible Persian pottery dating to the 9th century has been noted as well. Thus, Koh Ker has been linked to long distance value chains for considerable time spans. Although the area may have been significantly repurposed during the 10th century construction-boom heyday of Jayavarman IV, site use and activity continued well beyond the 10th century. Intensity of activities and density of occupation may have oscillated over time in relation to political and socio-economic factors. Natural and human resource management variables as well as environmental phenomena may have also played significant roles related to changes in popularity, population and productivity. The project is part of the Nalanda - Sriwijaya Centre (NSC) Field School led by Dr. D. Kyle Latinis (NSC) and Dr. Ea Darith (APSARA National Authority) with further support from the National Authority for Preah Vihear (NAPV).

=== Looting ===
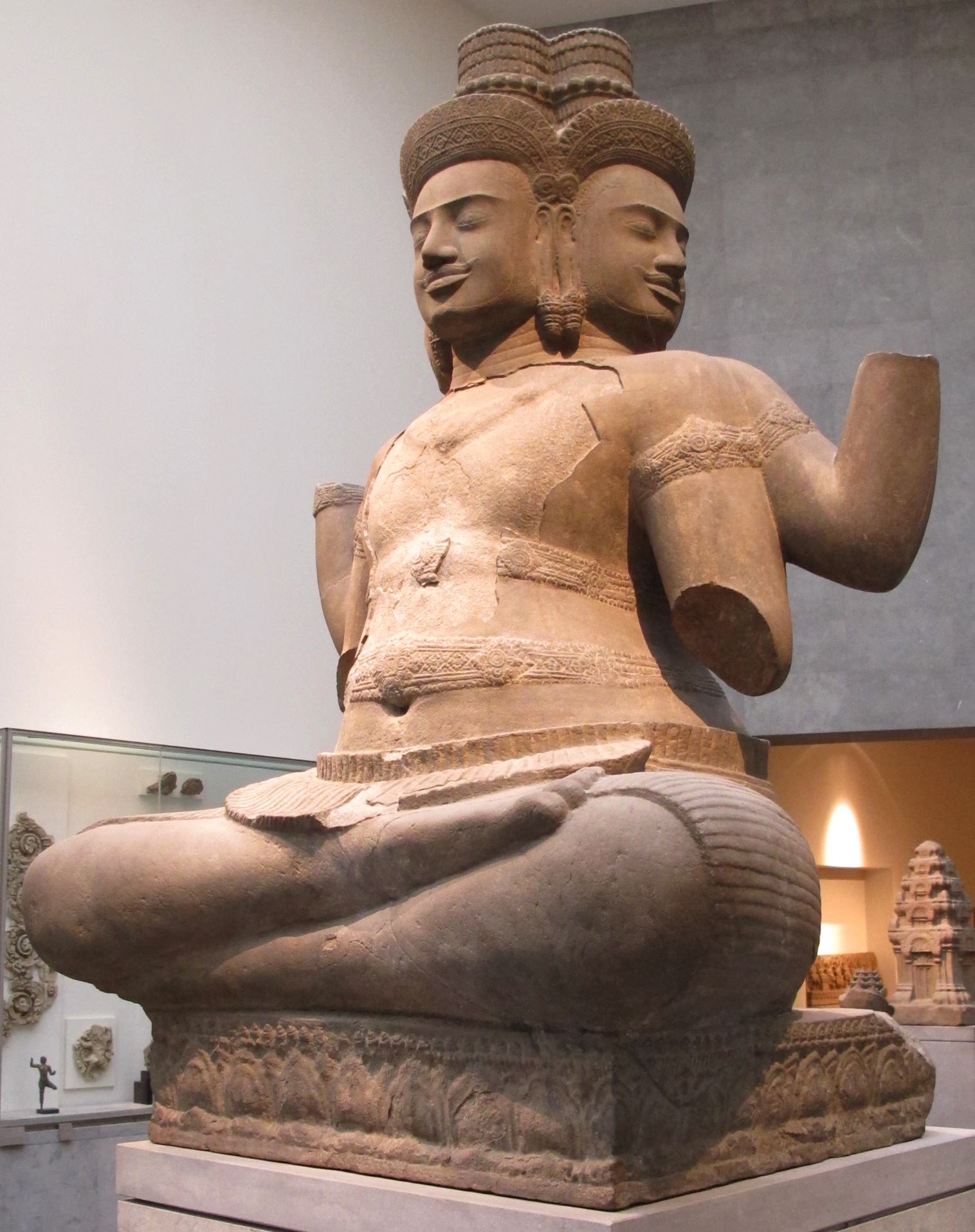
Statue of Brahma, Koh Ker style, 925-950 ca., Musée Guimet, Paris.

None of the immense, expressive and beautiful sculptures are left at the site. Numerous of them were stolen and are standing now in museums and also in private collections. Some statues were put away by government organizations to protect them from looters. Many masterpieces of Koh Ker are now in the collection of the National Museum in Phnom Penh.

In late 2011, the remote location drew media attention worldwide when Sotheby's attempted to sell a statue of a mythical Khmer Empire warrior. In March 2012, the US and Cambodian governments filed court documents to seize the statue that they purport was illegally removed from the site. A twin statue, also linked to the Koh Ker site, is on display at the Norton Simon Museum in Pasadena, California.

== Religion ==
Before Koh Ker became capital of the Khmer empire (928 AD), numerous sanctuaries with Shiva-lingas existed already. Koh Ker was a cult site where Shiva had been worshipped a long time. Also Jayavarman IV was an ardent worshipper of this Hindu god. As later kings (whose residence was not in Koh Ker) also followed Buddhism, they gave orders to make the necessary adjustments at their temples. Because of its remoteness, the sanctuaries at Koh Ker were spared from these interventions.

== Inscriptions ==
Several inscriptions were found which mention Koh Ker as capital of the empire in Siem Reap, Battambang, Takeo and Kampong Cham (city). From inscriptions discovered at Koh Ker, it is estimated that more than ten thousand people lived at Koh Ker when it was the capital (928 – 944 AD). The inscriptions explain how manpower was organised: taxes in form of rice were raised in the whole country and served to provide for the workers who came from different provinces. An inscription at Prasat Damrei says that the shrine on the top of the state temple (Prang) houses a lingam of about 4.5 m (14 ft 9 in) and that the erection of this Shiva-symbol gave a lot of problems". A Sanskrit inscription at Prasat Thom gives evidence of the consecration of a Shiva-lingam 921 AD which was worshipped under the name of Tribhuvaneshvara ("Lord of the Threefold World").

== Description ==
The center of the ancient city was in the north-east corner of the baray (water-tank). Inscriptions say at least ten thousand inhabitants lived there during the rule of Jayavarman IV. Past researchers believed a square wall with a side length of 1.2 km (1,312 yd) protected the town. But new research indicates that the linear structures found in this part of Koh Ker were dykes of ancient canals. Concerning the wooden buildings of the Khmer time no artefacts are found.

Laterite, sandstone and brick were used as construction materials in Koh Ker. Laterite and sandstone of excellent quality were quarried in great quantities in the region of Koh Ker, so the transport of the stones to the site was no problem. The bricks produced were small, regular and very solid. A thin layer of organic mortar of unknown formula was used, possibly some form of plant sap. After more than a millennium the brick sanctuaries in Koh Ker are in a much better condition than the laterite ones. The roofs of some temples in Koh Ker had a wood construction and were covered with tiles. In these monuments, holes for the wooden girders are found. The main sanctuary (the temple-complex Prasat Thom/Prang) was not standing in the middle of the ancient city.

== Water-Tanks ==
=== Rahal ===
The huge Baray (water-tank) called Rahal is the largest object at the site of the ancient capital Koh Ker. Its length is about 1,200 m (1,312 yd) and its breath about 560 m (612 yd). The water-tank has three dams covered by steps of laterite. The orientation of the Rahal is not from east to west like the huge water-reservoirs in Angkor; it follows an orientation of North 15° West. Because the most important monuments at Koh Ker have the same orientation it is thought that the Baray was constructed first and the rest of the structures were laid out around it. The Rahal was carved out partly of the stone ground but it is not clear if a natural hollow was the reason for its orientation. These days most parts of the Baray are dried out and covered by grass. Some puddles can be seen in the corner next to the double-sanctuary.

=== Trapeang Andong Preng ===
200 m (219 yd) south of the double-sanctuary Prasat Thom/Prang is a basin dug into the earth with a length of 40 m (44 yd). It has steps of laterite on all sides. During the rainy season the water is standing to a depth of 7 m (23 ft 0 in). The Trapeang Andong Preng does not belong to a temple, but it could have been a royal bath, because near this place was once the wooden palace of the king.

=== Trapeang Khnar ===
(carvings)

== Temples and shrines ==
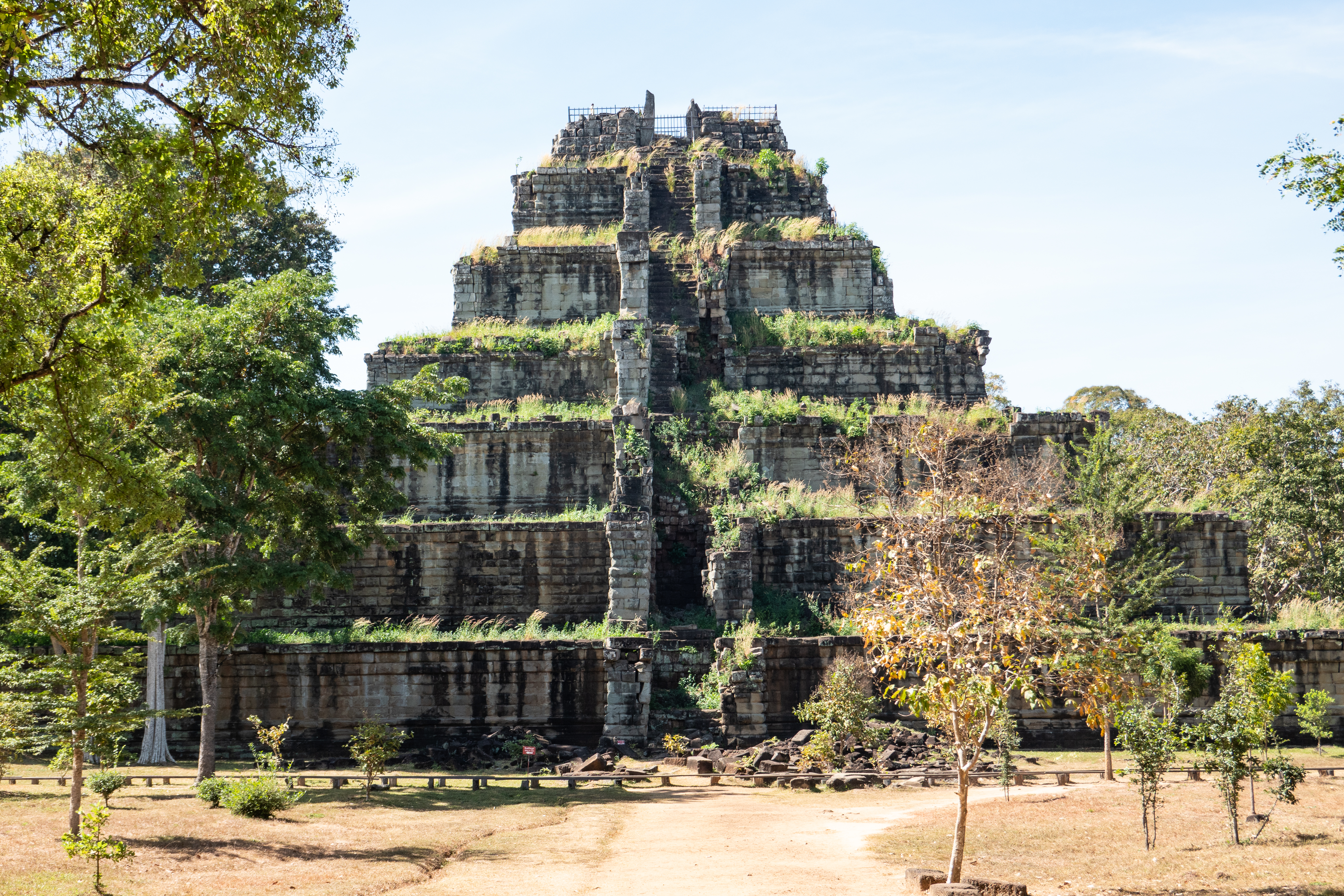
View of the seven tiered pyramid at Koh Ker

=== Complex of the double sanctuary Prasat Thom/Prang ===
==== Linear plan ====
The complex of the main monument in Koh Ker has a linear plan and is about 800 metres (875 yd) long. Its orientation is E15°N, that is parallel to the Baray. The parking area cuts the complex in two parts. On the east side of the parking are two structures, called palaces. On the west side are the other monuments. They are standing behind the restaurants and are from east to west: an immense entrance pavilion, two towers, a red brick entrance-tower (Prasat Krahom), a surrounding wall with two courts (in the eastern court is the temple-complex Prasat Thom with a moat, in the western court stands the seven tiered pyramid, named Prang). Behind the enclosure is an artificial hill, the so‑called Tomb of the White Elephant. With the exception of Prasat Krahom and the Prang (pyramid), this temple-complex is in bad condition.

==== Palaces ====
At the east side of the parking area are two structures the so-called palaces. Each consists of four rectangular buildings surrounding a court. All eight buildings have three rooms, some have a patio with pillars. Possibly these palaces served as meditation- or prayer-rooms for the king or nobles.

==== Entrance pavilion and laterite towers ====
Between the palaces and the closest monument is a distance of 185 metres (607 ft). On the left side of the parking area (behind the restaurants) is the entrance pavilion made of sandstone. It stands 45 metres (148 ft) away from the double sanctuary and has a cruciform ground-plan. The crossbar is 60 metres (197 ft) long; the stringer has a length of 30 metres (98 ft). Parallel to the cross-bar are two halls. Directly behind the entrance-pavilion are the ruins of two huge laterite towers.

==== Prasat Krahom ====
Behind the ruins of the entrance-pavilion and the laterite towers is a red brick tower, called Prasat Krahom (krahom = red), which gives entrance to the enclosed monuments. It has a cruciform plan, is in a good condition and once housed a statue of the Dancing Shiva with five heads and ten arms. The sculpture had a height of 3.50 metres (11 ft 6 in), but is now broken completely. A fragment of a hand of 0.5 metres (20 in) can be seen in the National Museum in Phnom Penh.

==== Outer enclosure ====
The outer enclosure has a length of 328 metres (1,076 ft) and a breadth of 151 metres (495 ft) An additional wall divides the inner area in two. In the eastern court are a moat and the temple-complex Prasat Thom; in the western court is the pyramid, called Prang. The eastern court with a length of 153 metres (502 ft) is nearly square, the western court has a length of 171 metres (561 ft).

==== Moat ====
The moat in the eastern court is about 47 metres (154 ft) wide. It borders the Prasat Thom. Lined by trees it looks very picturesque. Two dams, one at the east side, the other at the west side are leading to the ground within the moat. The dams are flanked by Naga-balustrades. On the eastern dam between the Nagas was additionally a colonnade with pillars. Behind each Naga of the east side was standing a huge Garuda.

==== Prasat Thom ====
Probably some parts of the Prasat Thom including the moat and the 1. (inner) enclosure were built before 921 AD. The sanctuary was expanded under the reign of Jayavarman IV and has now two surrounding walls inside of the moat. The first wall (inner wall) is made of brick; the second wall (outer wall) with a length of 66 m (217 ft) and a breath of 55 m (180 ft) is made of laterite. Two doors are in the east and in the west. The doors of the second wall have a cruciform plan. The doors of the first wall are smaller and not of cruciform layout. The plane between the first and second wall is completely overbuilt with rectangular structures, possibly later additions. In the center court is the sanctuary and opposite it are two so‑called libraries. Behind the sanctuary on a rectangular platform stand nine towers in two rows (one of five, one four towers). Twelve smaller prasats in groups of three surround the platform. All 21 towers once housed lingas.

==== Prang ====
The seven‑tiered pyramid called Prang was probably the state temple of Jayavarman IV. Construction of the sanctuary was started in 928 AD. At ground level one, side of the square building measures 62 m (203 ft). The height is 36 m (118 ft). Originally on the top platform stood a huge lingam probably more than 4 m (13 ft) high and having a weight of several tons. Inscriptions say that it was the tallest and most beautiful Shiva-ling-am. The ling-am probably stood in a shrine which some researchers say could have been about 15 m (49 ft) high. On the north side of the pyramid is a steep staircase leading to the top. The original stairs are in a very bad condition as is the bamboo-ladder which was constructed in the 20th century, so it is forbidden to climb to the top of the pyramid via this route. There is however a new staircase which can be used to ascend to the top tit of the pyramid. Concerning the seventh tier some scientists say, this was the platform of the shrine because on its sides beautiful reliefs of Garudas were made. There is just one Khmer temple which resembles the temple Baksei Chamkrong in Angkor. But the four‑tiered monument there is much smaller and has a staircase on each of the four sides. On the platform on the top of the Baksei Chamkrong is a prasat in a good condition.

==== Tomb of the White Elephant ====
Behind the court with the seven‑tiered pyramid is an artificial hill of exact circle form covered with trees. It is named Tomb of the White elephant. "The white Elephant" is a very well-known legend in southeast Asia. There are different theories about the hill. Some say that this structure could be the foundation of a second pyramid. Others say that it could be the grave of Jayavarman IV. The steep path leading to the top of the hill is closed now because of security reasons.

=== Sanctuaries along the access road ===
==== Prasat Pram ====
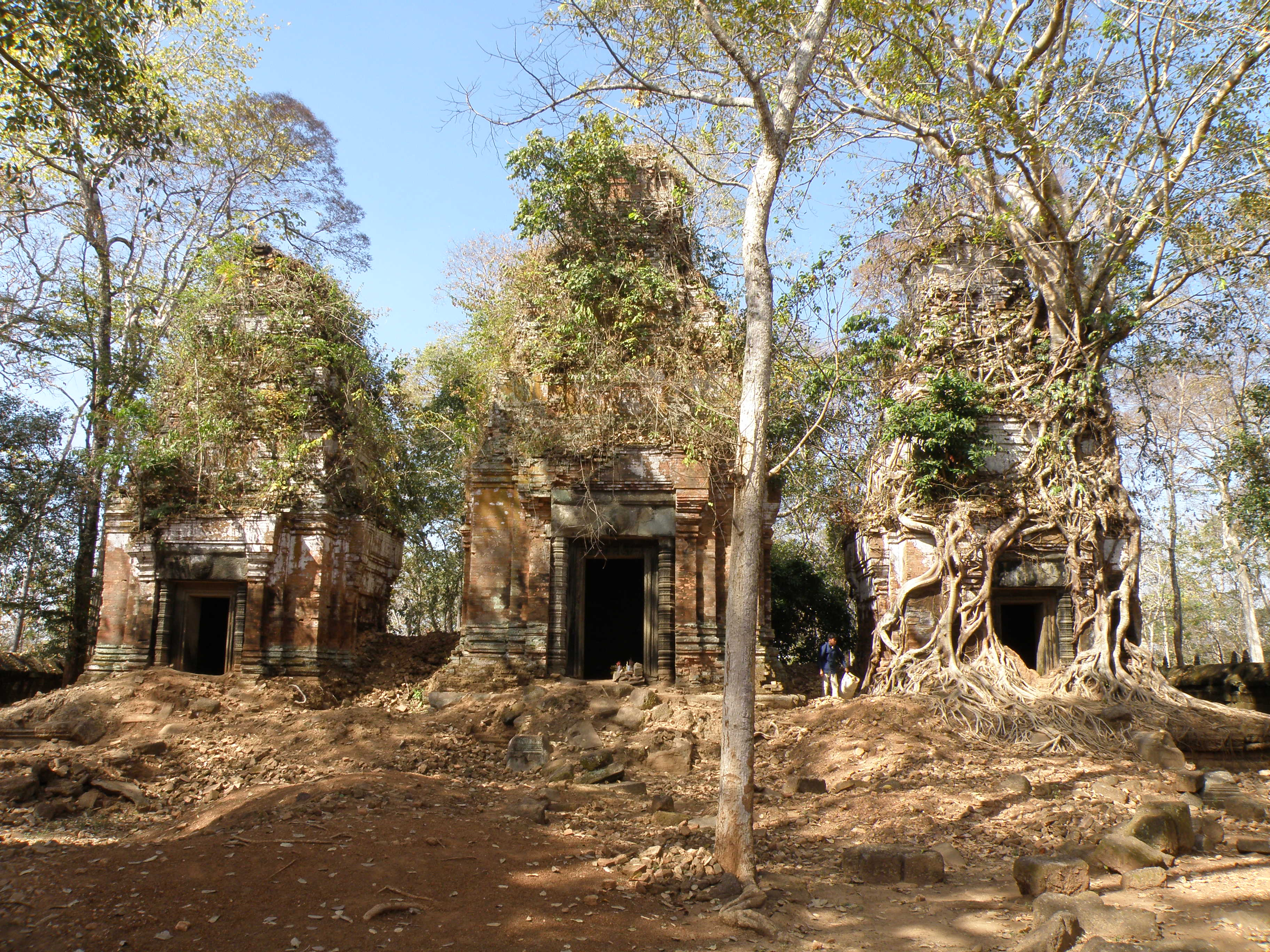
Prasat Pram

The most south sanctuary of this group is the Prasat Pram on the west side of the road. A small (300 metres (328 yd)) long path leads to the monument. It has five towers or prasats (pram = five). Three brick towers stand in a row on the same platform. They face east. The central one is a bit taller than the others. In each of these prasats, once stood a lingam. These and the beautifully carved lintels were looted. Two prasats (faced west) are standing in front of the platform. One is built of brick and has diamond‑shaped holes in the upper part. This fact indicates that this tower once served as a fire sanctuary (fire cults were very important during the era of the Khmer kings). The other building is small, made of laterite and (in comparison with the brick towers) in bad condition. The bricks of small regular size are held together with an organic mortar of unknown composition (plant sap?). Originally the towers were covered by white stucco; remains of it can still be seen. Two of the towers are pictorially covered by roots. The five towers are surrounded by an enclosure. The collapsed entrance door (gopuram) is at the east side. Two artefacts of the Prasat Pram can be seen in the National Museum in Phnom Penh: A damaged lion statue and fragments of a standing four-armed Vishnu.

==== Prasat Neang Khmau ====
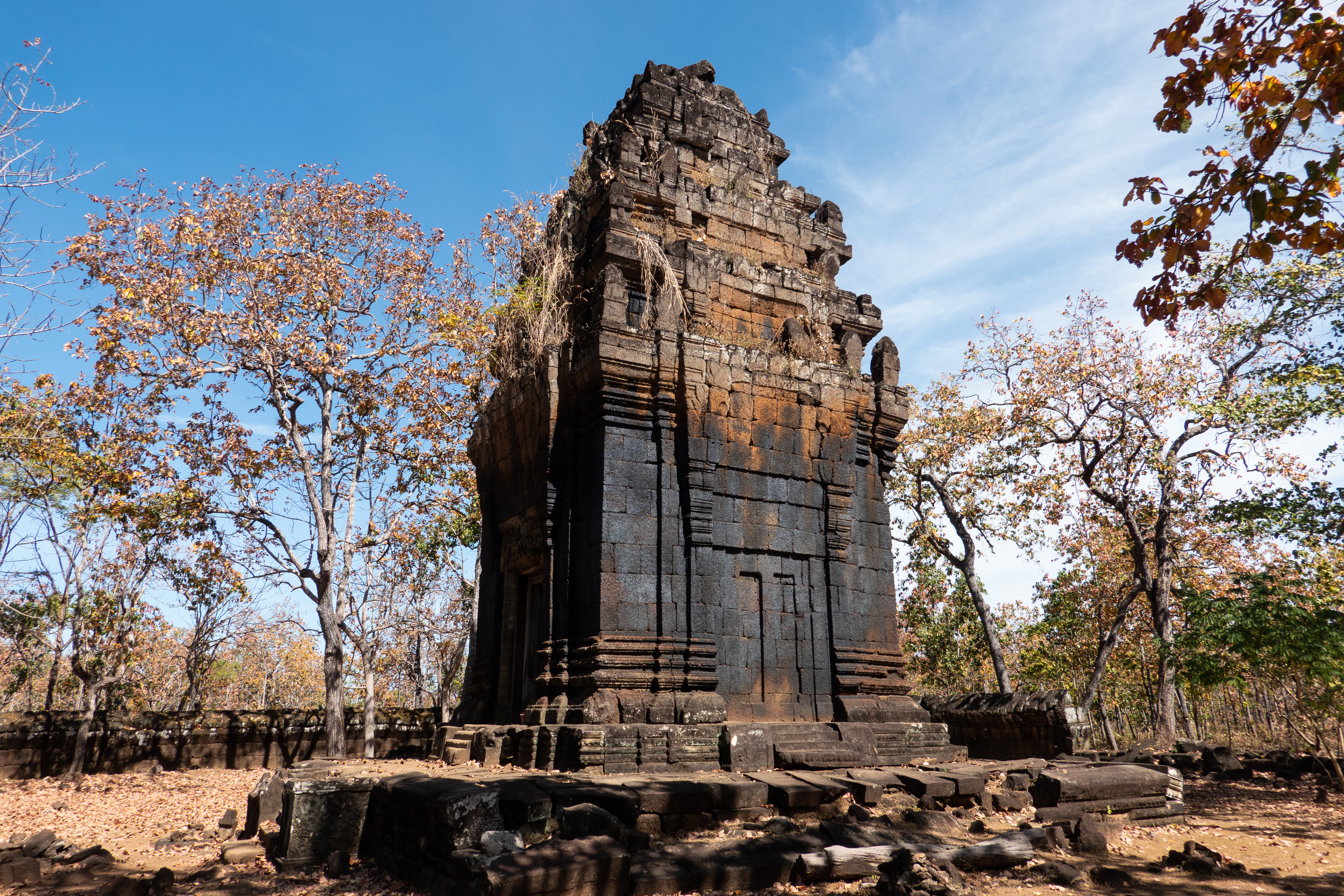
Prasat Neang Khmau showing fire-scarred walls

Located 12.5 km (7.8 mi) to the south of the main Koh Ker pyramid and built of sandstone and brick. An early 10th century temple dedicated to the Hindu deity Shiva. The temple's fire damaged (black) outer surface probably gave it its name (Neang Khmau means the "Black Lady" in Khmer).

The name of the temple is also said mean "Black Virgin" and legend says it might once have been heaven to Kali, the Dark Goddess of Destruction.

Another legend about the temple says that many years ago a powerful king Preah Bat Sorya Teyong lived at the Chiso mountain. One day his daughter Neang Khmao, went to Tonle Protron and met a handsome man, Bandit Srey, who instantly fell in love with her and who used magic to make her fall in love with him. When the king heard about this he ordered his daughter be exiled and he built two temples for her to live in. Whilst in exile she fell in love with a monk who subsequently fell in love with her and gave up being a monk to live with the princess in the temple since which it has been known as Neang Khmao Temple.

==== Prasat Bak ====
More north than the Prasat Neang Khmau and on the west side of the road is the Prasat Bak, a small square sanctuary built of laterite; one side measures only 5 m (16 ft). The temple which is in a very bad condition today housed till 1960 a colossal statue of Ganesha (Ganesha is a Hindu god, son of Shiva and Uma. He is depicted with a human body and an elephant's head). It is known, that the sculpture with the sitting Ganesha now is in a collection outside of Cambodia.

==== Prasat Chen ====
This sanctuary is the most north of this group and lies too on the west side of the street. It has two enclosures. The main entrance door (now collapsed) was itself a sanctuary with a square central room (one side measured 4 m (13 ft)). Three laterite towers (partially collapsed) stand on the same platform. In front of them are the remains of two brick libraries. The statue of the two fighting monkey kings Sugriva and Valin (figures of the Hindu epic Ramayana) was found at this site and is now in the National Museum in Phnom Penh. A fragment of a multi-armed statue of Vishnu was found in front of the tower in the middle. In this temple are five inscriptions. They mention the names of all the numerous peoples connected to the temple site and their function.

=== Monuments along the ring-road ===
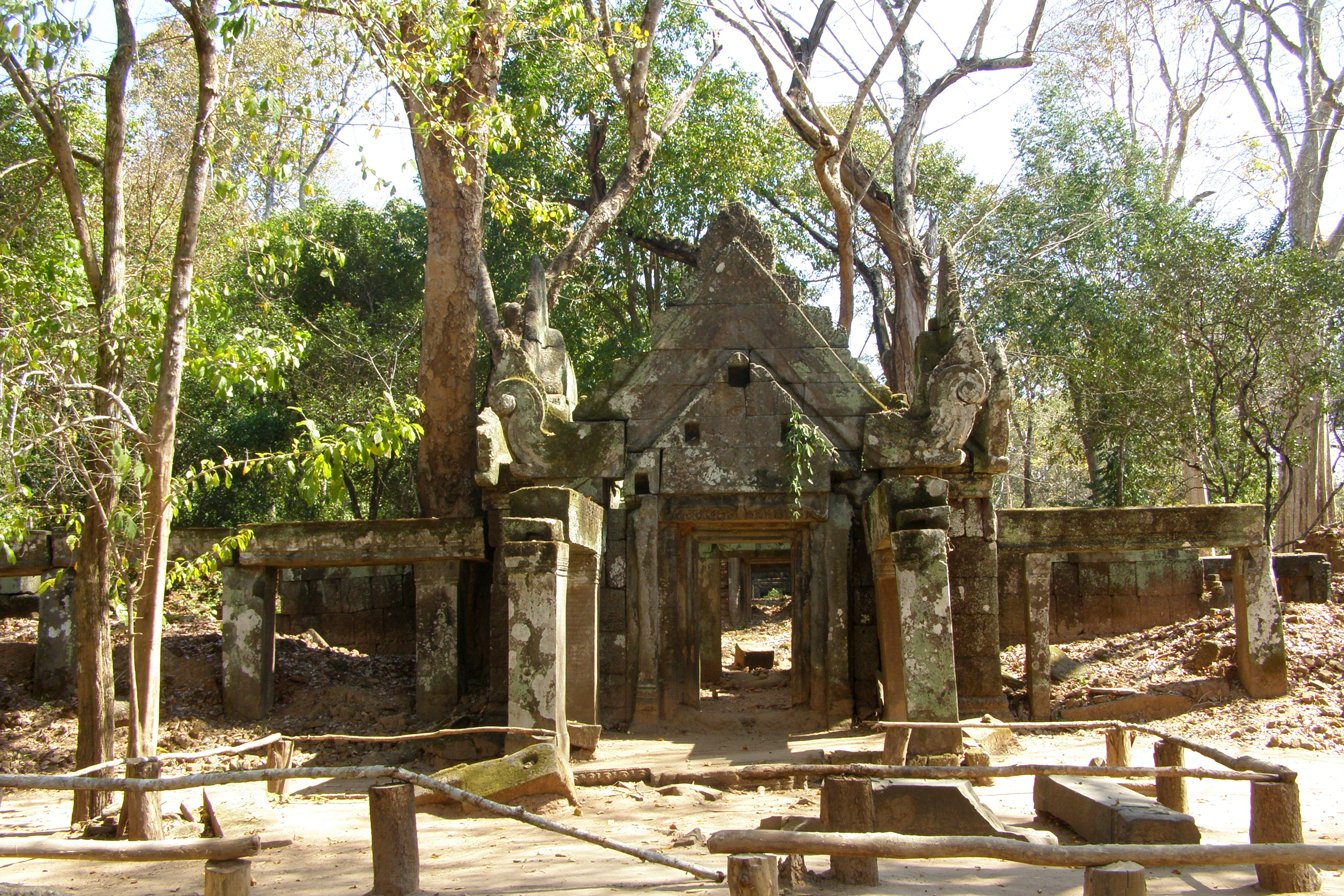
Ruins of Prasat Krachap

==== Prasat Balang (Prasat Leung Moi) ====
The Prasat Balang is the first of three Linga-Shrines standing along the ring-road. It is a square laterite building standing on a platform and has one doorway and an open roof. In the sanctuary is an impressive lingam standing on yoni. The phallus-symbol is about 2 m (7 ft) high, has a diameter of nearly 1 m (39 in) and a weight of several tons. Together with the yoni it was carved out of the bedrock at this place. The lingam is in a good condition. The yoni is about 1 m (39 in) high and looks like an altar. On all four sides once were carved reliefs. In each of the four corners stood a beautiful chiselled Garudu with raised arms giving the impression these mythical figures would bear the yoni. The reliefs and the Garudas were looted. Around the Yoni there is just a small space giving room for some priests to perform the prescribed rituals. The water they put on the lingam became holy by touching the symbol of Shiva, run down and was collected in a ditch of the yoni. Then via a spout (which is still intact) it flowed to the outside of the shrine where believers could touch the blessed water.

==== Prasat Thneng (Prasat Leung Pee) ====
The Prasat Thneng is very similar to the Prasat Balang. Looters tried to hack away the impressive lingam but were not successful. A notch of about a depth of half a meter (20 in) is left but the Shicva-symbol is still standing unshakeable at its place on the damaged yoni.

==== Leung Bye ====
Prasat Leung Bon

==== Prasat Andong Kuk (Prasat Sralau) ====
A Buddhist temple built late 12th century/early 13th century in the reign of Jayavarman VII, it was one of more than 100 of hospital-sanctuaries he built. The modern name Sralau refers to a species of tree

==== Prasat Krachap ====
Sometimes written Prasat Kra Chap, today the site has well preserved entrance gate and the ruins of 5 towers arranged in a quincunx. From inscriptions around the doors it has been established that the temple was dedicated in 928 to Tribhuvanadeva, a linga representation of Shiva.

==== Prasat Bantaey Pee Chean ====
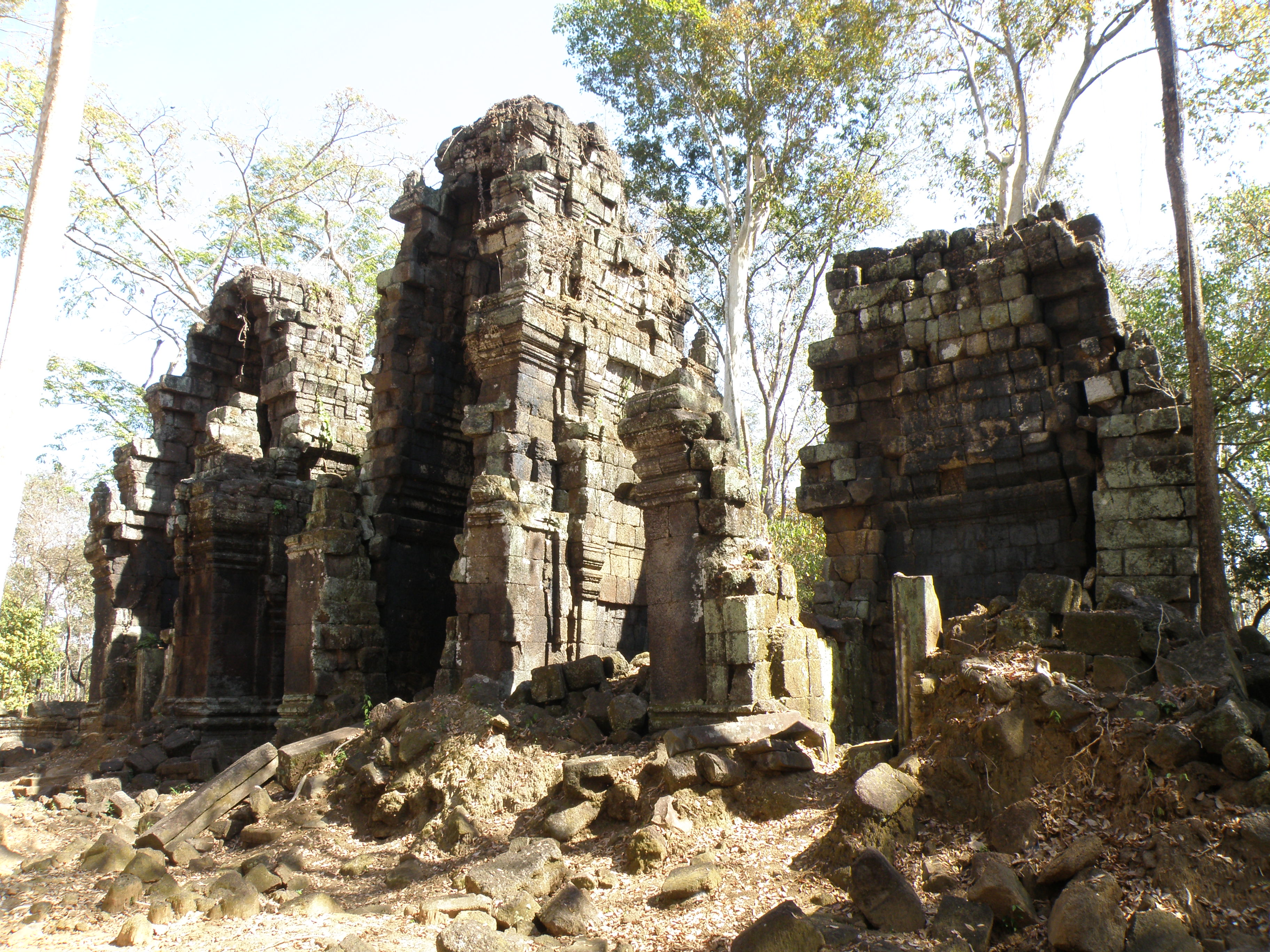
Banteay Peechean

==== Prasat Chrap ====
A temple comprising 3 towers built of laterite. Today all towers are badly damaged; the interiors with fire damage and the west facades destroyed suggesting damage was deliberate or due to a common design flaw. There are no surviving inscriptions to date the temple nor to identify which gods it was dedicated to.

==== Prasat Damrei ====
A small path leads from the ring-road to the Prasat Damrei (damrei = elephant). This sanctuary has an enclosure and stands on a high platform. On each of its four sides is a staircase with about ten steps. Eight stone lions once flanked the stairs but only one remains in its original place. A beautiful elephant sculpture once stood at each of the four corners of the platform but only two remain. The sanctuary is built of brick and is in good condition. A Sanskrit inscription found at the temple offers evidence that an erstwhile lingam was once erected on the top of the pyramid (Prang).
