= Harshavarman I =

King of the Khmer Empire
- Reign: 910 – 923
- Predecessor: Yasovarman I
- Successor: Ishanavarman II
- Died: 923
- House: Varman Dynasty
- Father: Yasovarman I
- Mother: Jayadevi
- Religion: Hinduism

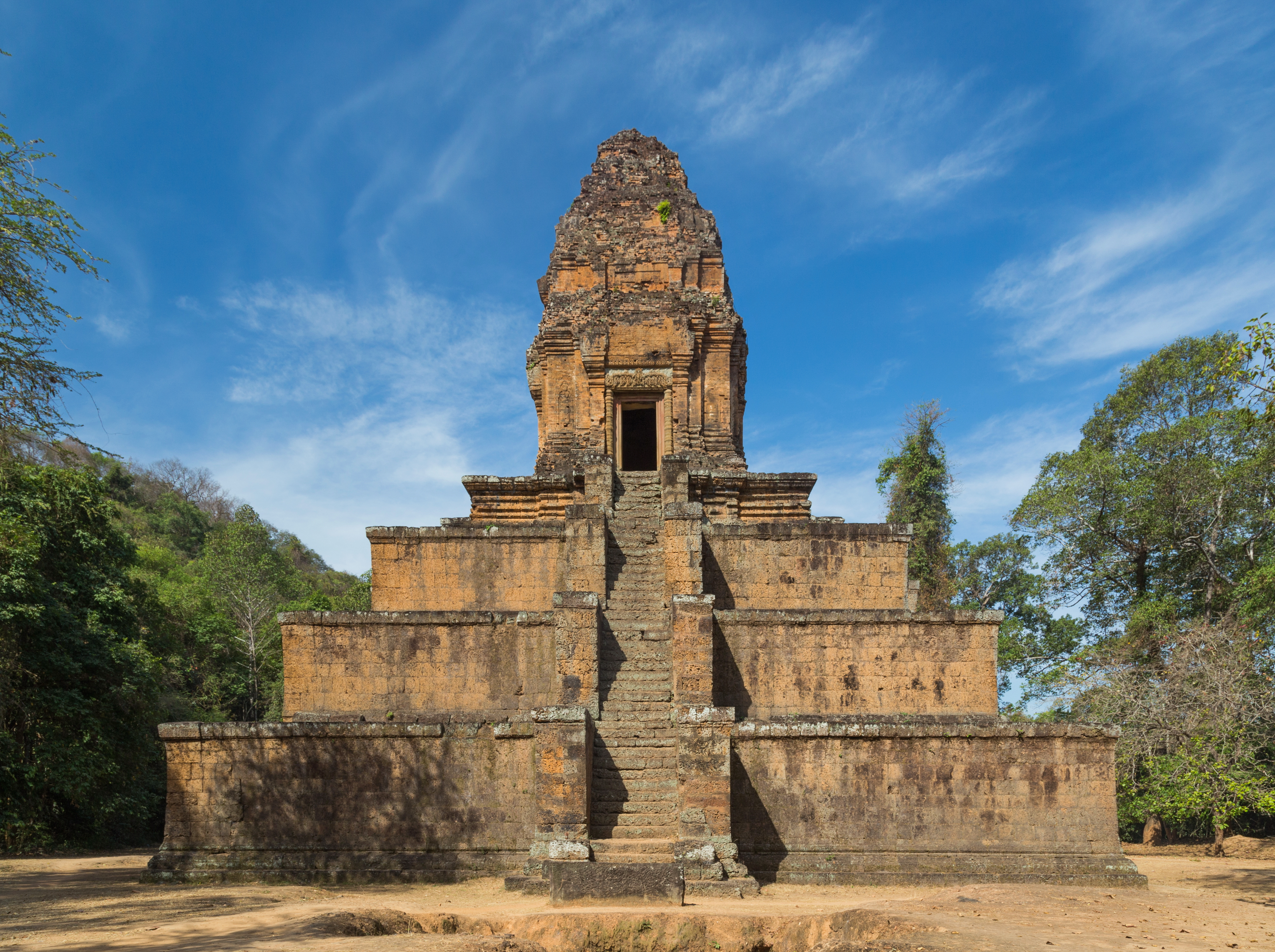
Baksei Chamkrong, temple of Harshavarman

Harshavarman I (Khmer: ហស៌វរ្ម័នទី១; or Rudraloka, died in 923) was an Angkorian king who reigned in 910–923 CE. He is mentioned by David P. Chandler, who is one of the foremost western scholars of Cambodia's modern history.

== Family ==
Harshavarman was a son of King Yasovarman I and his Queen, who was a sister of Jayavarman IV.

Grandparents of Harshavarman were King Indravarman I and his wife Indradevi.

Harshavarman had a younger brother, Ishanavarman II.

His queen was Kambujarajalakshmi. They were the maternal grandparents of Jayavarman VII.

His grandson was Yajnavaraha. He was a knowledgeable teacher.

== Biography ==
Following his death, Yasovarman was succeeded by Harshavarman.

The reigns of Harshavarman and his younger brother marked a period of instability for the Khmer Empire. Both brothers were involved in a power struggle with their maternal uncle, Jayavarman IV, a conflict that lasted for Harshavarman’s entire reign. Jayavarman was eventually driven out of Angkor to set up his own capital about 100 km away during the reign of Ishanavarman.

Nothing else is known about Harshavarman other than that he constructed the small temple-mountain of Baksei Chamkrong at the foot of Phnom Bakheng which he dedicated to his parents,

He died in 923 and was succeeded by Ishanavarman.

== Notes ==
Regnal titles
Preceded by Yasovarman	King of the Khmers; 910–923	Succeeded by Ishanavarman II
