= Prasat Bei =

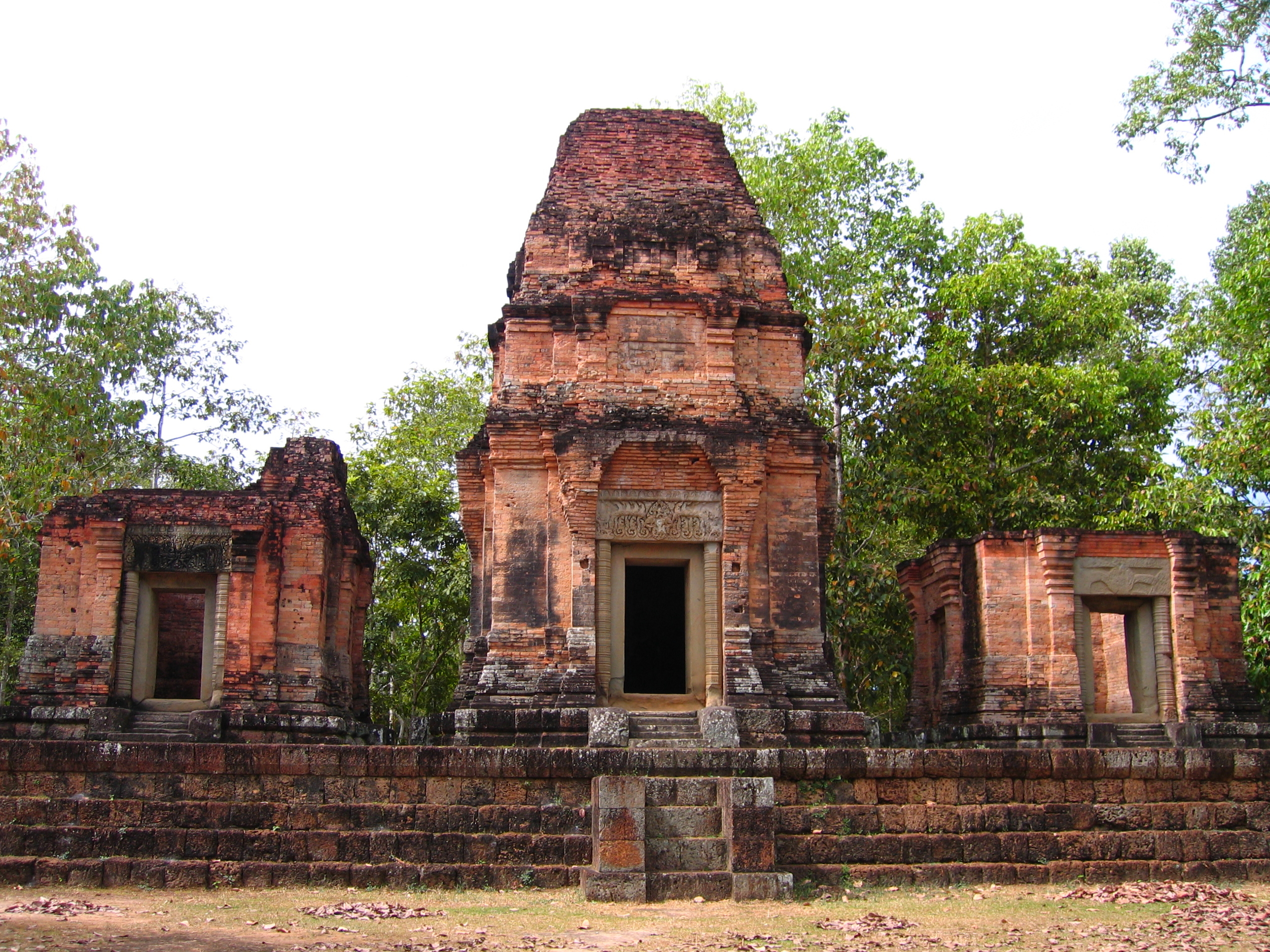
- Three towers of the temple

- Location within Cambodia

Religion
- Affiliation: Hinduism
- Province: Siem Reap

Location
- Location: Angkor
- Country: Cambodia
- Interactive map of Prasat Bei
- Coordinates: 13°25′34″N 103°51′23″E

Architecture
- Type: Khmer (Bakheng style)
- Creator: Yasovarman I
- Completed: 10th century AD
- Temple: 3 towers

Prasat Bei (Khmer: ប្រាសាទបី, "three temples") is a temple with three brick towers in a north-south row, facing to the east, and standing on a laterite platform. The central tower contained a linga; the flanking towers reach no higher than the doorways. Only the lintels of the central and south towers were carved, both showing Indra on the elephant Airavata.
