= Ishanavarman II =

- Successor: Jayavarman IV
- Died: 928 CE
- Father: Yasovarman I
- Mother: Sister of Jayavarman IV

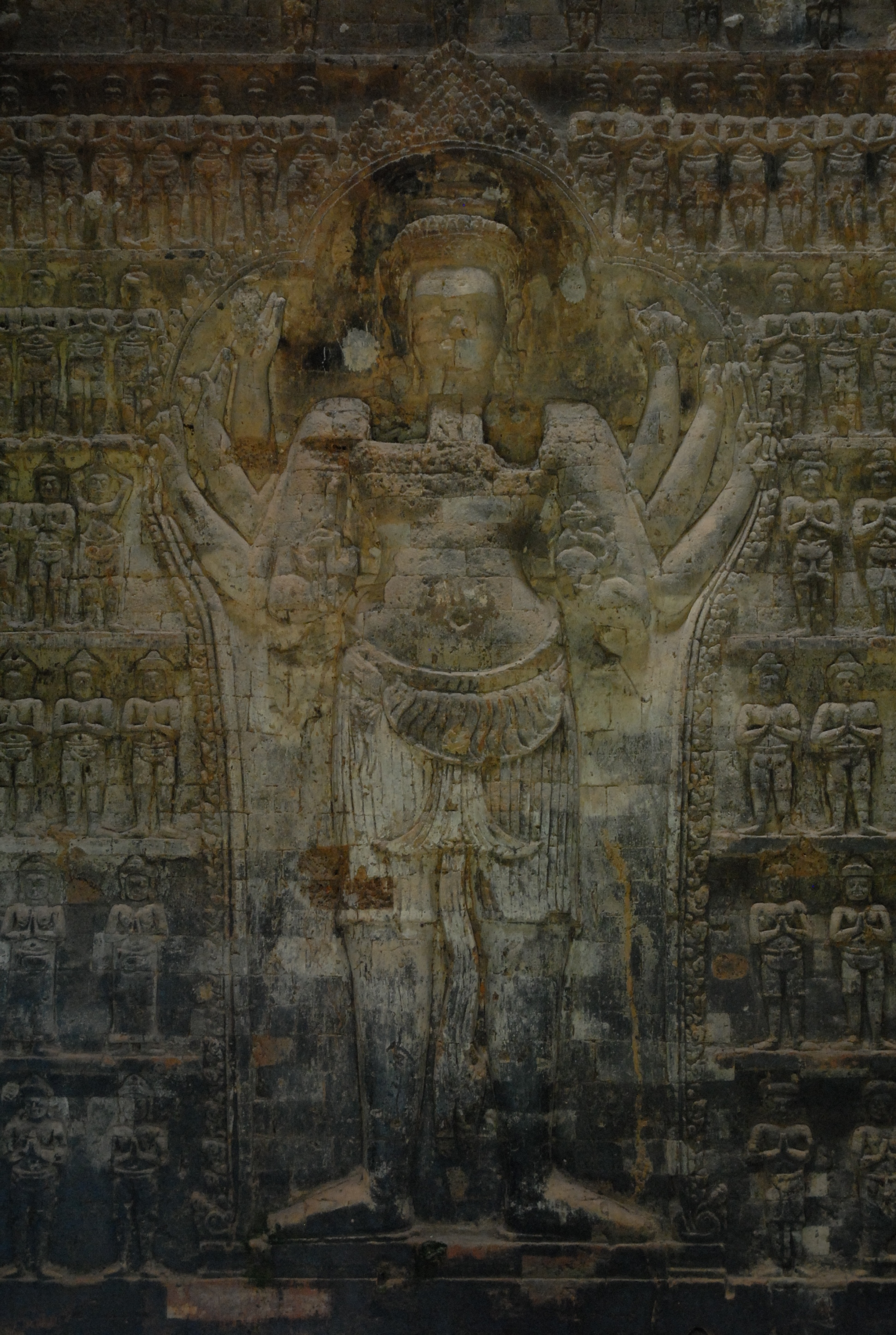
Prasat Kravan is a temple built during the reign of Ishanavarman.

Ishanavarman II (Khmer: ឦសានវរ្ម័នទី២) was an Angkorian king who is believed to have ruled from 923 to 928. His empire may have been confined to Angkor and the area around Battambang to the west.

== Family ==
Ishanavarman was a son of King Yasovarman and his wife, who was a sister of Jayavarman IV.

Grandparents of Ishanavarman were Indravarman I and his wife Indradevi.

Ishanavarman had an elder brother, Harshavarman I.

== Biography ==
Ishanavarman succeeded his dead brother in 923. The period of his reign may have been very tumultuous and chaotic.

In 921, his uncle, Jayavarman IV, had already set up a rival city about 100 km north-east of Angkor.

During Ishanavarman’s reign, a temple called Prasat Kravan was built.

Nothing else is known about Ishanavarman II. He died in 928 and received a posthumous name of Paramarudraloka.

Regnal titles
Preceded by Harshavarman I	King of Cambodia; 923–928	Succeeded by Jayavarman IV
