= Jayavarman IV =

Angkorian king

Jeyavarman IV (Khmer: ជ័យវរ្ម័នទី៤) was an Angkorian king who ruled from 928 to 941 CE. Many early historians thought that he was a usurper. However, recent evidence shows that he had a legitimate claim to the throne. During his reign, the nation had 12 cities or pura.

Head of a Deity or a Deified King

== Early years ==
He was the son of king Indravarman I's daughter, Mahendradevi, and was married to his aunt Jayadevi, a half-sister of king Yasovarman I. Because there were no clear rules of succession, his claim for the throne through a maternal line seemed to be valid. He contested the reigns of Yasovarman I's sons at Angkor since the death of their father. In 921 he set up his own capital at Koh Ker: an inscription dated 921 states, "Jayavarman IV left the city of Yashodharapura to reign at Chok Gargyar taking the Devaraja with him." The rivalry lasted from 921 until the death of Ishanavarman II in 928, after which Jayavarman IV reigned supreme.

== Koh Ker ==
Famous for its ancient ruins, Koh Ker can be reached more easily than in the recent past thanks to a toll road. This old capital city of Jayavarman IV remained abandoned for over a thousand years before French scholars, like Louis Delaporte and Étienne Aymonier, had been visiting and studying at the end of 19th century. During his reign the capital city was known as Chok Gargyar (the Island of Glory) or Lingapura. There was a walled city of about 1200 m^{2}, but subsidiary temples are scattered on a surrounding area of 35 square kilometers. The main zone encompasses the Rahal baray (1,188 × 548 m) and Prasat Thom complex, with its seven-tiered pyramid 30 metres high. The summit of the temple housed a colossal linga, now disappeared, probably made of metal casing as high as almost 5 metres. Inscription K.187E designates the Old Khmer name for this linga as kamrateṅ jagat ta rājya, “the god who is the king”. "Jayavarman IV's inscriptions boasted that his constructions surpassed those of previous kings." A large number of the best and largest Angkorian sculptures were made during his reign, e.g. the Garuda standing in the entrance of National Museum of Cambodia. A royal highway lead to Beng Mealea at south and to Angkor at west.

== Tax Collection ==
To build a magnificent city in such a short period of about 20 years, it must have required an enormous amount of wealth and labour. The majority of Jayavarman's inscriptions are from Koh Ker, but they had been found also in sites on the borders of khmer dominion, as Nong Pang Puey (near Aranyaprathet)) and Phnom Bayang (Mekong Delta). They shed some lights as to how this was being done. Labor forces were gathered from many provinces and taxes were paid in kind: such as, rice, wax, honey, elephants or cloth. Contrast to many ancient civilizations, Angkor did not mint any coin to use as currency. Tax collection in those days was probably performed by a tamrvac (modern: tamruot, or policeman). A tamrvac or “royal inspector” had his real authority in the provinces. Taxes were collected from all the territories that Jayavarman IV had controlled. The tax collection system was very efficient if not brutal. As for those who refused to pay, they will be "caged by the elders and placed before the king for sentence." However, the king, palace functionaries, monks and slaves were exempt from paying taxes.

== Posthumous Name ==
Jeyavarman IV died in 941 and received the posthumous name of Paramashivapada. His succession was not peaceful and his young son Harshavarman II reigned briefly until 944. Then Rajendravarman, who was both uncle and first cousin of Harshavarman, returned the capital to Yasodharapura.

== Notes ==
Regnal titles
| Preceded by Ishanavarman II | Emperor of Angkor; 928–941 | Succeeded by Harshavarman II |
