= Family tree of Khmer Varman monarchs =

Varman Dynasty or Lavo Dynasty (Khmer: រាជវង្សវរ្ម័ន; Romanised: Rhea vong sa Varaman) was an ancient Cambodian royal house which ruled the Khmer Empire (Khmer: ព្រះរាជាណាចក្រកម្ពុជា) and its predecessor states, Funan and Chenla. Its origin is traditionally traced from two legendary kings, Kambusvayambhuva (Khmer: កម្វុស្វយម្ភុវ), who married Mera (Khmer: មេរា), founding the Chenla kingdom, and Kaundinyavarmandeva (Khmer: កៅណ្ឌិន្យវរ្ម័នទេវ), who married Queen Soma (Khmer: សោមា), founding the Funan kingdom. The later Khmer kings claimed ancestry from both.

== Family tree ==
Family tree of Khmer Varman monarchs

Queen Soma r.~68–100	Kaundinya I r.~100–150	Rudravarman II r.731-758	Prithindravarman r.757–770	Satyavarman r.770–787	Indravarman I r.787–801	Harivarman I r.802–817	Skandavarman II r.370–385
Bhadravarman r.380–413	Mera; Indigenous	Kambu Svayambhuva r.~100–?	Hun Pan-huang r.~150–198	Srei Meara r.201–225	Fan Xun r.244–289	Candana r.357–410	Devaditya	Vikrantavarman III r.817–854	Viravarman r.385–400
Gangaraja r.413–?	Devanika	Sri Sarvabhauma; Cakravartin	Hun Pan-pan r.198–201	Fan Zhan r.225–244	□ r.289–357	Kaundinya II r.410∼434	Indraditya	Rudravarman r.~800-830	Skandavarman III r.400–436
Manorathavarman r.?–420	Srutavarman r.550–555	□ (female)	Srindravarman r.434∼484	□ (concubine)	Jayavarman r.484–514	Kulaprabhavati r.514–517	Bhadravarman II r.~830-854	Simhavarman II r.436–477
Yasodhara	Prathivindravarman	Sreshthavarman r.555–560	Kritantapasa	□ (female)	Rudravarman r.514–550	Gunavarman	Pvirakvarman r.550–600	Indravarman II r.854-898	Skandavarman IV r.477–490
Devavarman r.510–526	Bhavavarman I r.580–600	Kambujarajalakshmi r.575–580	Viravarman r.560–575	Viralakshmi	Dharmaditya	Mhenteractvarman r.600–615	Jaya Simhavarman I r.898-903	Nandivarman I r.490–500
Vijayavarman r.526–529	□ (female)	Mahendravarman r.600–616	Sri Somasarma	□ (female)	Candravarman	Vijayavarman	Nteractvarman r.615–627	Saktivarman r.904-905	Kumaravishnu II r.500–510
Rudravarman r.529–572	Isanavarman I r.616–639	□ (female)	Sri Surya	Bhavavarman II r.639–657	Baladitya	Nrpatindraditya	□ (female)	Bhadravarman III r.905–917	Buddhavarman r.510–525
Jaya Sambhuvarman r.572–629	Bhavavarman II r.639–657	Śivadatta	Hiranyavarman	Jayavarman I r.657–681	Visvarupa	Sarasvati	Rajapativarman	Indravarman III r.918–960	Kumaravishnu III r.525–555
Kandarpadharma r.629–645	Jagaddharma	Sri Sarvani	Subhakirti	Sobhajaya	Jayadevi r.681–713	Nripatindravarman I r.713–716	Dharmaditya	Jaya Indravarman I r.959–965	Simhavarman III r.555–560
Prabhasadharmavarman r.645–648	Queen of Champa r.650–653	Prakasadharma r.653–686	Sagaradharma r.~648–656	Fan carrier (female)	Sambhuvarman; 618–629	Mahendradevi	Narendralakshmi	Paramesvaravarman I r.965–982	Simhavishnu r.560–600
Bhadresvaravarman r.648–650	Naravahanavarman r.686–688	Harshavarman r.656–665	□ (male)	Indrani c.716–760	Pushkaraksha r.716–730	Indravarman IV r.982-986	Mahendravarman I r.600–630
Sanjaya r.717—760	Vikrantavarman II r.688–741	Pra Poat honne Sourittep r.757–800	□ (female)	□ (female)	Rudravarman r.730–760	Narendradevi	Harivarman II r.989–997	Narasimhavarman I r.630–668
Dyah Pancapana r.760—775	Nrpatendradevi c.760–780	Rajendravarman I r.760–770	Harivarman III r.1007–1018	Mahendravarman II r.668–669
Dharanindra r.775—800	Jayendradhipativarman	Agastya	Yasomati	□ (male)	Pinsvargaramavati	Vikrantavarman IV r.1030–1041	Parameswaravarman I r.670–695
Samaragrawira r.800—812	Nrpatendradevi	Narendravarman	Hiranyadama	Prithivindravarman (Lakshmindra)	Prithivindradevi	Punnagavarman	Jaya Simhavarman II r.1041–1044	Narasimhavarman II r.695–728
Samaratungga r.812—833	□ (female)	Narendralakshmi	Sivakaivalya	Sivasoma	Indravarman I r.877–889	Sri Udayadityavarman r.~960	Nandivarman II r.725–731
Rakai Pikatan r.833—856	Jayavarman II r.780–802	Jayendraprabha c.780–802	Rajendradevi	Mahipativarman r.770–780	Dharanindradevi (Kambujalakshmi)	Jayavarman II r.802–850	□ (male)	Haji (Hia-Tche) r.960–980	Nandivarman II r.731–795
Balaputra r.833—850	Adītaraj r.800–859	Jyestharya c.802–803	Indradevi	Rajendralakshmi	Jayavarman III r.850–877	Fan carrier	Cudamani Warmadewa r.980–988	Dantivarman r.795–848
Bhagadatta r.859–?	Virendravarman	Mahendradevi	Mahendravarman	□ (female)	Yasovarman I r.889–910	Vasudeva	Maravijayottunggavarman r.988–1008	Vijayalaya Chola r.847–871
Sundaraprakrama	Jayadevi	Jayavarman IV r.928–941	Ishanavarman II r.923–928	Harshavarman I r.910–923	Lakshmi	Manassiva	Sumatrabhumi r.1008–1017	Aditya I r.871–907
Sundararavarman	□ (female)	Harshavarman II r.941–944	Rajendravarman II r.944–968	Tvan	Damodara	Cudamani	Kavisvara	Prana; Saptadevakula	Vijayottunggavarman r.1017–1025	Parantaka I r.907–955
Narapatisimhavarman r.937–971	Mangalavarman r.971–986	Narendradevi	Rajapativarman r.986–1001	tan kanraten an	Yajnavaraha	Vishnukumara	Rajaditya Chola r.935–949	Gandaraditya r.955–956	Arinjaya Chola r.956–957
Divakarabhatta	Indralakshmi	Jayavarman V r.968–1001	□ (female)	Rajendrapandita	□ (female)	Sankarapandita	Uttama r.973–985	Parantaka II r.958–973
Virendradhipativarman c.1108	Sunthorathet r.996–1006	Vishnukumara	Mahidharavarman r.~925–960	Udayadityavarman I r.1001–1002	Jayaviravarman r.1002–1010	□ (female)	□ (female)	Jivaka (Kampoch) r.930–946	Aditha Karikalan r.966–971	Rajaraja I r.985–1014
Lakshmipativarman r.1006–?	Sri Sukarma	Prithivindra r.~960–1010	Samarendradhipativarman	Sadasiva	Viralakshmi	Narpatindralakshmi	Suryavarman I r.1006–1050	Suryalakshmi	Rajendra I r.1014–1044
Virendravallabha r.?–1052?	Sujitaraja r.927–930	Hiranyalakshmi	Hiranyavarman r.~1010–1060	□	Udayadityavarman II r.1050–1066	Sangrama	Rajadhiraja I r.1044–1052	Virarajendra r.1063–1070	Rajendra II r.1052–1063
Yuvaraja	Dharanindraditya	Dharanindrarajalakshmi	Dharanindravarman I r.~1060, 1107–1113	Jayavarman VI r.1080–1107	Vijayendralakshmi	Nandavarman	Nripatindravarman II r.1080–1113	Athirajendra r.~1070	Sri Saiyanarong r.1050–1060
Tribhuvanabrahmendra	Rajendralakshmi	Rajapatindralakshmi	Mahidharaditya	Narendralakshmi	Ksitindraditya	□ (female)	Harshavarman III r.1066–1080	Lakshmi	Dharmakasat r.1060–1070
Chandrachota r.1052–1069	Phanom Thale Seri r.1150–1157	Dharanindravarman II r.1150–1156	Narendraditya	Suryavarman II r.1113–1150	Jaya Indravarman III r.1139–1145	Rudravarman IV r.1145–1147	Jaya Paramesvaravarman I r.1044–1060	Sri Dharmasokaraja I r.1077–1157
Jayasimhavarman r.1115–1150	Hiranyalakshmi	Sri Dharmasokaraja II r.1157–1181	Chandrabhanu r.1243–1262	Hiranya	Bhupendrapandita	Bhupatindralakshmi	Jaya Harivarman I r.1147–1166	Jayarajacudamani	Rudravarman III r.1061–1074	Sri Dharmasokaraja II r.1157–1181
Jayarajadevi	Indradevi	Jayavarman VII r.1181–1218	Rajendradevi	Yasovarman II r.1156–1165	Tribhuvanadityavarman r.1165–1177	Jaya Indravarman IV r.1177–1181	Suryavarman	Suryajayavarman	Harivarman IV r.1074–1080	Sri Dharmasokaraja III r.1181–1230
Nripatindravarman III r.1180–1218	Indravarman II r.1218–1243	Suryakumara	Jayamahapradhana	Sriprabha	Subhadri	Jayamangalartha I	Indrajayavarman r.1308–1327	Paramabhodhisatva r.1081–1086	Sri Dharmasokaraja IV r.1230–1262
Sikhara Mahadevi	Srindrapatindradityavarman r.1218–1238	Virakumara	Jayavarman VIII r.1243–1295	Chakravatirajadevi	□ (female)	Angrajadevi	Jayavarman IX r.1327–1336	Jaya Indravarman II r.1086–1113	Sri Dharmasokaraja V r.1262–1272
Pha Mueang r.1238–1295	Indravarman III r.1295–1308	Srindrabhupesvarachuda	□ (male)	Jayamangalartha II	Chandravaradevi	Jaya Indravarman II r.1114–1129	Jaya Paramesvaravarman II r.1220–1254

Śreshthapura	Vyadhapura	Bhavapura	Isanapura	Sambhupura	Aninditapura	Hariharalaya	Yasodharapura	Koh Ker	Shailendra	Mahidharapura	Vimayapura	Lavapura
