= Varman dynasty (Cambodia) =

Ruling dynasty of ancient Cambodia

Varman dynasty រាជវង្សវរ្ម័ន
- Parent family: House of Kaundinya (lunar); House of Kambuj (solar); House of Mahidharapura
- Country: Funan; Chenla; Khmer Empire
- Etymology: Varman
- Founded: late 1st century
- Founder: Kaundinyavarmandeva
- Final head: Jayavarmadiparamesvara
- Historic seat: Vyadhapura
- Titles: King of Funan; King of Chenla; King of the Khmer Empire
- Members: 55
- Connected members: Jayavarman II; Suryavarman II; Jayavarman VII
- Estate: Yasodharapura
- Dissolution: 1336
- Cadet branches: House of Mahidharapura

The Varman dynasty (Khmer: រាជវង្សវរ្ម័ន) was the ruling dynasty of ancient Cambodia.

== History ==
The Varman Dynasty was established by King Kaundinyavarmandeva (Khmer: កៅណ្ឌិន្យវរ្ម័នទេវ), who married Queen Soma (Khmer: សោមា), who ruled the indigenous kingdom and established her spouse as the king of the Nokor Phnom or Funan kingdom, forming the Varman dynasty. There is evidence in the Sanskrit stone inscription mentioning that the Brahmin Kaundinya who received the magic spear from the Brahmin Ashwatthama (Sanskrit: अश्वत्थामा, Roman: Aśvatthāmā), the son of Drona (Sanskrit: द्रोण, Roman: Droṇa), had arrived in the kingdom of the Nāga (IAST: nāga; Devanāgarī: नाग) tribe and had finally waged a war and negotiated with them peacefully. Through marriage, Kaundinya Brahmin therefore was established as King Kaundinyavarmandeva (Khmer: កៅណ្ឌិន្យទី១), the first King of the Varman Dynasty.

Zhou Daguan, the Chinese diplomat during the reign Emperor Nian Chengzong of the Yuan dynasty traveled to Angkor in 1296 to record the traditions and places, including the royal family and court traditions which corresponds to the reign of King Indravarman III (ឥន្ទ្រវរ្ម័នទី៣). Zhou Daquan was not the first Chinese to enter the kingdom but made the most detailed record of the lives of the Angkorians known as Zhenla Feng Tuji (Chenla Tradition Record). This record is an important record about Angkor and the Khmer Empire. In addition to the stone inscriptions and other documents depicting the daily lives of the residents of Angkor. From this record, the order of kings in the Varman dynasty is known in detail, which later became the original version of the Cambodian royal chronicles.

== Monarchs of the Varman dynasty ==
Kingdom	Title	Reign	Royal House	Notes
Funan Kingdom	Queen Soma (Liu-Yeh)	late 1st cent.		
Funan Kingdom	Kaundinyavarmandeva	late 1st cent.		
Funan Kingdom	Hun P'an-huang	late 2nd cent.	Fàn dynasty	Founder of Vyadhapura, "city of the hunter king"
Funan Kingdom	Srei Meara (Fàn Shīmàn)	205–225	Fàn dynasty	He was the first king from Fàn dynasty.
Funan Kingdom	Fàn Jīnshēng	225	Fàn dynasty	
Funan Kingdom	Fàn Zhān	225–244	Fàn dynasty	
Funan Kingdom	Fàn Chāng	244	Fàn dynasty	
Funan Kingdom	Fàn Xún	244–289	Fàn dynasty	
Funan Kingdom	Fàn Tiānzhú	289–357	Fàn dynasty	
Funan Kingdom	Chandana (Chu Chān-t’án)	357–410	Murunda	
Funan Kingdom	Kaundinya II	410~434	Kaundinya	
Funan Kingdom	Srindravarman	434~478	Kaundinya	
Funan Kingdom	Kaundinyajayavarman	478 - 514	Kaundinya	
Funan Kingdom	Rudravarman I	514—540	Kaundinya	The last Funan King
Funan Kingdom	Queen Kulaprabhavati	514—517	Kaundinya	Claimed to the throne (529—550)
Sreshthapura	Srutavarman	550–555	Kambuj	
Sreshthapura	Sreshthavarman	555–560	Kambuj	
Sreshthapura	Queen Kambujarajalakshmi	575–580	Kambuj	
Bhavapura	Viravarman	560–575	Bhavapura	
Chenla Kingdom	Bhavavarman I	550—590	Bhavapura	First King of the Chenla Kingdom
Chenla Kingdom	Mahendravarman	590—611	Bhavapura	
Chenla Kingdom	Hiranyavarman I	~611	Bhavapura	He reigned at the same time as Mahendravarman.
Chenla Kingdom (Isanapura)	Isanavarman I	611–640	Vyadhapura	Isanapura was found in 618 AD. Annexation of Funan was complete.
Chenla Kingdom	Bhavavarman II	639–657	Vyadhapura	
Chenla Kingdom	Jayavarman I	640—681	Vyadhapura	
Chenla Kingdom	Queen Jayadevi	690—713	Vyadhapura	
Sambhupura	Sambhuvarman I	713–716	Sambhupura	
Aninditapura	Baladítya	Unknown	Baladityapura	Founder of Baladityapura
Aninditapura	Visvarupa	Unknown	Baladityapura	
Aninditapura	Nripatindravarman	Unknown	Baladityapura	
Aninditapura	Indraloka	716–730	Baladityapura	
Aninditapura	Sambhuvarman II	730–760	Baladityapura	
Sambhupura	Rajendravarman I	760–790	Baladityapura	
Sambhupura	Mahipativarman	790-802	Baladityapura	Javanese Kingdom occupied the Chenla Kingdom.
Khmer Empire (Indrapura)	Jayavarman II	802—850	House of Sambhupura	First King of Khmer Empire, declared himself as Emperor at Mahendraparvata.
Khmer Empire	Jayavardhana	850–877	Sambhupura	He reigned the throne at Hariharalaya.
Khmer Empire	Indravarman I	877–889	Baladityapura	He reigned the throne at Hariharalaya.
Khmer Empire	Yasovarman I	889—910	Yasodharapura	Founder of Yasodharapura
Khmer Empire	Harshavarman I	910–925	Yasodharapura	
Khmer Empire	Ishanavarman II	925–928	Yasodharapura	
Khmer Empire	Jayavarman IV	928–941	Yasodharapura	
Khmer Empire	Harshavarman II	941–944	Yasodharapura	
Khmer Empire	Rajendravarman II	944–968	Yasodharapura	
Khmer Empire	Jayavarman V	968–1001	Yasodharapura	
Khmer Empire	Udayadityavarman I	1001–1002	Yasodharapura	
Khmer Empire	Jayaviravarman (Narapativiravarman)	1002—1010	Yasodharapura	Suryavarman I was son of King Jivaka of Shailendra dynasty, who usurped the throne.
Khmer Empire	Suryavarman I (Kambojaraja)	1002—1050	Shailendra	His father was Jivaka (Sujitaraja), King of Tam-bralinga. He claimed the throne through his mother, a royal member descended from Fàn dynasty.
Khmer Empire	Udayadityavarman II	1050-1066	Shailendra	
Khmer Empire	Harshavarman III	1066-1088	Shailendra	
Khmer Empire	Nripatindravarman	1088–1113	Shailendra	He was the last king from Shailendra dynasty.
Khmer Empire	Jayavarman VI	1082–1107	House of Mahidharapura	He usurped the throne from Vimayapura. He was the first king from the House of Mahidharapura. He built Prasat Phimai.
Khmer Empire	Dharanindravarman I	1107–1113	Mahidharapura	He reigned the throne from Vimayapura.
Khmer Empire	Suryavarman II	1113–1145	Mahidharapura	He was the first king from the House of Mahidharapura, who reigned in Yasodharapura.
Khmer Empire	Dharanindravarman II	1150–1160	Mahidharapura	
Khmer Empire	Yasovarman II	1160–1165	House of Mahidharapura	He was seized the throne by King Tribhuvanadityavarman, a Chinese nobleman.
Khmer Empire	Tribhuvanadityavarman	1165–1177		He was executed during Champa attacked Angkor.
Khmer Empire	Jayavarman VII	1181~1215	House of Mahidharapura	He successfully expelled Champa and established Angkor Thom as the capital.
Khmer Empire	Indravarman II	~1215-1243	Mahidharapura	
Khmer Empire	Jayavarman VIII	1243–1295	Mahidharapura	
Khmer Empire	Srindravarman	1295–1307	Mahidharapura	
Khmer Empire	Srindrajayavarman	1308–1327	Mahidharapura	
Khmer Empire	Jayavarman Paramesvara	1327–1336	House of Mahidharapura	The last King of Cambodia whose name appears on a Sanskrit stone inscription End of rule by the House of Mahidharapura
