= Javanese raids on Indochina =

8th centuries military campaign on Indochina

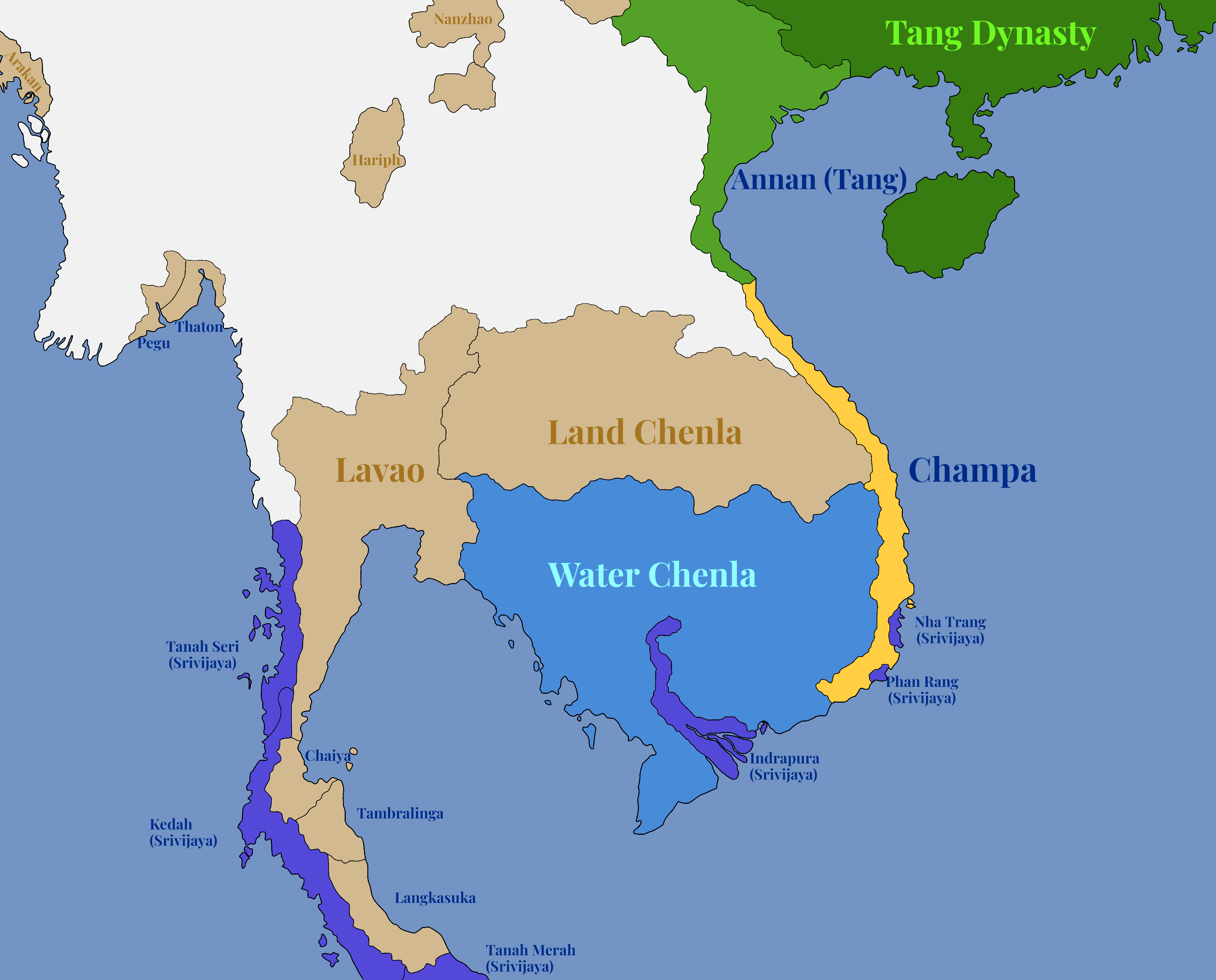
- Map of Indochina shows land raided by the Javanese (purple)
Date	c. 767–790
Location	Eastern and southern coast of Indochina (present-day Cambodia and Vietnam)
Result	Shailendra victory
Territorial changes	Destruction of several coastal areas in Indochina; Southeastern coast of Champa was under the Shailendra control; Water Chenla became the vassal of Shailendra dynasty

Belligerents
Shailendra dynasty of Java and Sumatra	Tang dynasty; Annan; Champa Kingdom; Water Chenla

Commanders and leaders
Dharanindra; Jayavarman II	Chang Po-i; Prithindravarman †; Satyavarman # Indravarman I Mahipativarman (executed)

Strength
1,000 "medium-sized" vessels	Unknown

Javanese raids on Indochina or the Shailendra's campaign on Indochina, were a military campaign launched by the Shailendra dynasty of Java to capture strategic trade areas in Indochina region and spread their influences through Chenla, and to conquer the area.

== Background ==
According to Chinese sources, Chenla splits into the two factions, Land Chenla and Water Chenla. As a result of these conditions, the Chenla suffered an epidemic situation, of which the Shailendra dynasty became aware of.

Many Javanese sailors who sailed in South China Sea saw a huge potential in the middle of chaotic situation in Chenla, as the Javanese ships used the port in Chenla as their shelters frequently, allowing the Javanese sailors to gain an insight on the situation in Chenla, which the would be useful to the preparation of the upcoming military campaign. After the Shailendra dynasty received the reports in Water Chenla from the reports of Javanese sailor, the Shailendra decided to launch an military campaign on Water Chenla.

== Campaigns ==
=== Raids on Tonkin and Champa (767, 774–787) ===
In c. 767, Shailendra dynasty fleets from Java (Daba) launched military attacks. Cambodian inscriptions were generally said the fleets was Malayan, Sumatran, Javanese, or all of them, quickly seized the island of Pulo-Condor on the southern Chenla, and the island were used by Javanese pirates to conducting some numerous military raids on Champa and Chiaou-Chou.

In the same year, the Tonkin coast was attacked by forces described as Java (Shepo) of Shailendra and Kunlun raiders,

In the same year, the Tonkin coast was assaulted by Java (Shepo) of Shailendra and Kunlun raids, around modern-day Hanoi, the capital of Tonkin (Annam).

In 767, Kunlun and the Javanese forces under the leadership of governor Chang Po-i assaulted Tonkin area, vanquishing the attacking forces.

Champa was subsequently assaulted by Javanese or Kunlun vessels in 774 and 787. In 774, a series of assaults was launched again against Po-Nagar in Nha-trang where the pirates demolished temples, while in 787 an assault targeted Phang-rang. Several Champa coastal cities suffered naval raids and assault from Java.

Javanese armadas were recorded as Javabala-sanghair-nāvāgataiḥ (fleets from Java) in Champa epigraphs. These raids were believed to be launched by the Sailendras, the dynasty ruler of Java and Srivijaya. The assaults on Champa were probably prompted by commerce rivalry, particularly competition in trade with the Chinese market. The epigraph describing the 787 assault was in Yang Tikuh while the 774 epigraph was originated from Po-nagar.

In 774, Javanese raiders from the south launched a surprising seaborne invasion of Champa in Kauthara province, plundering cities, stealing the golden statue of Bhagavati, and demolished the Champa's Siva-linga temple of Po Nagar. Prithindravarman, the predecessor of Champa king Satyavarman, was killed by the invaders amidst chaos. Champa source mentioned their invader as foreigners, sea-farers, eaters of inferior food, of frightful appearance, extraordinarily black and thin. The 774 assault by the Javanese occurred during the rule of Isvaraloka (Satyavarman). Cham record mentioned that their country was hit by ferocious, pitiless, dark-skinned sea raiders, which modern historians believed to by Javanese. Java had commercial and cultural links to Champa. The 774 assault was initiated in Cambodia.

Javanese raid was launched via the Pulo Condor Island. Malaya, Sumatra or Java all could have been the origin of the assaulters. The Kauthara Nha Trang temple of Po Nagar was ruined when ferocious, pitiless, dark-skinned men born in other countries, whose food was more horrible than corpses, and who were vicious and furious, came in ships . . . took away the [temple linga], and set fire to the temple. In 774 according to the Nha Trang epigraph in Sanskrit by the Chams. Men born in other lands, living on other foods, frightful to look at, unnaturally dark and lean, cruel as death, passing over the sea in ships assaulted in 774.

In 787, during the reign of Indravarman, the Javanese assaulted Champa. In Phan-rang the Sri Bhadradhipatlsvara temple was burned. It was mentioned the armies of Java, having come in vessels of the 787 assault, and of the previous assault, that Satyavarman, the King of Champa vanquished them as they were followed by good ships and beaten at sea and they were men living on food more horrible than cadavers, frightful, completely black and gaunt, dreadful and evil as death, came in ships in the Nha-trang Po Nagar epigraph in Sanskrit, which called them men born in other countries. The ruin of the temple at Panduranga in 787 came at the hands of the assaulters.

=== Javanese invasion of Chenla ===
In the late 8th century, c. 780, Chenla faced war against the Javanese pirates. The pirates ultimately took over the Mekong Delta and then later took over Chenla. However, author Michael Vickery asserts that these categories of Water and Land Chenla that was created by the Chinese were misleading and meaningless because the best evidence shows that until 802 AD, there was no singular great state in the land of ancient Cambodia, but a number of smaller ones.

Shailendras maharaja, Dharanindra ordered his minister to maintain secrecy and while preparing 1,000 medium-size armed vessels and embarking as many troops as possible. He declared openly that he only intended to make a pleasure cruise on the islands around Chenla; and he wrote for the governors of the islands that had submitted to him, notifying them that he was going to take a pleasure trips on the islands. This news were spread everywhere and the governors of the each islands prepared to receive the Maharaja. When the order was already executed and the preparation are finished, the letter embarked and his fleets and troops are set out to the Chenla.

The Khmer king of Water Chenla, Mahipativarman were not aware of the ruse of Maharaja until Maharaja was seized the control of the river and lead his forces to the Chenla capital, Vyadhapura. They took the capital by surprise and surrounded the palace. Mahipativarman successfully escaped but was later pursued and captured at Sambhupura, the capital of Land Chenla. He was brought to Aninditapura, near Vyadhapura. Khmer forces arrived later and realized that their king was already captured by the Javanese forces. After the capture of Khmer king, the Maharaja took him to the palace of Aninditapura and Maharaja seated at throne place and also started conversations with Khmer king. The Maharaja said to the king:

"What caused you to form a desire which was not into your powers for satisfy, which would not given you happiness if you realized it and which would not have been justified as it easily realizable."

Khmer king did not replied if the Maharaja continued his conversations:

"You have manifest the desire to see before you my head on a plate; but if you also had wished to seize my kingdom or only to ravage a part of it, I would have done the same to Khmer. As you have expressed only the first of these desires, I am going to apply to you the treatment you wished to apply to me, and I will then return to my country, without taking anything belonging to Khmer, either of great or small value. My victory (will serve as a lesson) to your successors; no one will be again tempted to undertake a task above his power nor desire more than the share given to him by destiny; one will consider himself fortunate to have health when he can enjoy it."

Then he had the head of Mahipativarman cut off. He approached the Khmer minister and said to him:

"I am going to reward you for the good (you tried to do) in acting as a good minister; for i know well how you wisely counselled your master. (What a pity for him) that he did not listen to you. Look now for some one who will make a good King after this fool, and put him in place of the latter."

== Aftermath ==
Water Chenla had become dependent on the thalassocratic Shailendra dynasty on Java and the Srivijaya city-state on Sumatra. The polity was incorporated into the Javanese monarchy around the year 781. Land Chenla maintained its integrity under Jayavarman II.

When the Maharaja came back to Medang, he placed before him the plate containing the head of the Khmer king. Then he called the high officials of Medang and told them what had happened and his motives for making the expedition against Chenla. Upon learning of this, the people of Zabag (Java) prayed for their King and wished him all kinds of honors. The Maharaja then had the head of the king of the Chenla and placed his head into the vase and send it to the king who was the successor of Chenla's king. The Maharaja also send a letter to the successor, he said:

"I have been prompted to act as I have done against your predecessor because of the hatred he manifested against us, and we have chastened him (to give a lesson) to those who wish to imitate him. We have applied to him the treatment he wished to apply to us. We think it wise to send you his head, for it is not necessary now to keep it here. We do not draw any glory from the victory we have won over him."

== Sources ==
- Lawrence, Palmer Briggs (1950). "The Khmer Empire and the Malay Peninsula". The Far Eastern Quarterly. 9 (3). JSTOR.org: 256–305. doi:10.2307/2049556. JSTOR 2049556.
- Lawrence, Palmer Briggs (1951). The ancient Khmer Empire (PDF). Philadelphia: American Philosophical Society.
- Vickery, Michael (1994), What and Where was Chenla?, École française d'Extrême-Orient, Paris
- Lafont, Pierre-Bernard (2007), Le Campā: Géographie, population, histoire, Indes savantes, ISBN 978-2-84654-162-6
