= Paramabhodhisatva =

- Raja-di-raja-di-raja-diraja

King of Champa
- Reign: 1081–1086
- Coronation: 1081
- Predecessor: Jaya Indravarman II (deposed)
- Successor: Jaya Indravarman II (second term)
- Born: Quang Nam, Champa
- Died: Indrapura
- Issue: Prince Vyu
Names
- Prince Pāñg
Regnal name
- Yām̃ po ku vijaya Śrī Paramabhodhisatva
- Dynasty: Harivarmanid dynasty
- Religion: Buddhism

Paramabhodhisatva was a king of Champa, reigning from 1081 to 1086. He usurped power from his nine-year-old nephew Jaya Indravarman II in 1081 shortly after his succession.

Prince Pāñg was born into a noble family of both northern and southern Cham ancestry. Pāñg and his brother Prince Thäng (Harivarman IV) was adventuring into a Cham civil war that had been lasting for 16 years. Rudravarman III (r. 1062–1074) reigned like a tyrant king. According to Paramabhodhisatva, Rudravarman was taken away from the capital by rebels. The country then descended into chaos with more than 10 guys declared themselves King of Champa and they fought against each other. The kingdom was devastated. Prince Pāñg faced a self-proclaimed ruler of Phan Rang and defeated him at battle.

After spending years building up effort and fighting off other warlord factions, the two brothers reunified the realm by 1074. Prince Thäng was crowned Harivarman IV of Champa. In 1076, Prince Pāñg was commissioned to repulse a Angkorian invasion. He captured the Khmer prince Nandavarmadeva at the Battle of Somesvara. The Cham then counterattacked and raided all Khmer cities in the east bank of the Mekong River. When Harivarman retired in 1080, his nine-year-old son Prince Väk was designated as heir. The inexperienced young Jaya Indravarman II, "did not know how to govern the kingdom properly and did everything contrary to the rules of the government", was deposed by his uncle and chief regent, Prince Pāñg after being incumbent for around one month.

Prince Pāñg now ruled with no opposition. He entitled himself Śrī Paramabhodhisatva as a devout Buddhist, and Putau ekacchatra ("unique king" who enjoying the magnificent of royal richness). Relation between Champa and the Song Empire temporarily absented during his reign. In 1084, Paramabhodhisatva and his family gave royal splendors to the temple of Po Nagar. His gifts included elephants, electrum ornaments, sea jewelries, and precious stones. Princess Garbhalakśmi, Paramabhodhisatva's eldest sister, gave to the Goddess of Po Nagar pure gold.

In 1086, he was dethroned by Jaya Indravarman II.

== Bibliography ==
- Coedès, George (1975), Vella, Walter F. (ed.), The Indianized States of Southeast Asia, University of Hawaii Press, ISBN 978-0-824-80368-1
- Golzio, Karl-Heinz (2004), Inscriptions of Campā based on the editions and translations of Abel Bergaigne, Étienne Aymonier, Louis Finot, Édouard Huber and other French scholars and of the work of R. C. Majumdar. Newly presented, with minor corrections of texts and translations, together with calculations of given dates, Shaker Verlag

Preceded by Jaya Indravarman II 1080–1081	King of Champa; 1081–1086	Succeeded by Jaya Indravarman II 1086–1113
