= Rajadvara =

Po Klong Pilih Räjadvära (fl. 900s AD), abbreviation Rajadvara, alternate name Narendrādhipati, was a Cham nobleman and a minister who served the court of three Champa kings Jaya Simhavarman I (r. 897–904), Saktivarman (r. 904), and Bhadravarman II (r. 905–918) during the early 10th century.

Rajadvara was the father of Simhavarman's wife Tribhuvanadevi. His mother was Princess Lyań Vṛddhakula. His eldest son Sukṛtï Pov Kluñ Dharmapātha was described as king Indravarman II's favorite. He went on Buddhist pilgrimages (siddhayäträ) to Java in 908 and 911, acting as the king's diplomat.

In 911 he built a Mahayana temple dedicated to Avalokiteśvara in present-day Quảng Trị. The temple, Vṛddhakeśvara, was named after his mother.
