= Devavarman =

Devavarman may refer to:

- Devavarman (Maurya) (r. c. 202 – c. 195 BC), Indian emperor
- Devavarman (Champa) (r. 510 – c. 526 AD), Southeast Asian ruler
- Devavarman (Chandela dynasty) (r. c. 1050 – c. 1060 AD), Indian king

== See also ==
- Debbarma, an Indian (Tripuri) surname
- Debbarma dialect, a dialect of the Tripuri/Kokborok language
