= Indrani (name) =

Indrani is a feminine Indian name. Indrani is the name of Shachi, wife of Hindu God Indra.

== List of persons with the given name ==
Indrani
- Gender: Female

- Indrani Haldar (born 1971), Indian actress
- Indrani Sen, Bengali singer
- Indrani Mukherjee, Indian actress
- Indrani (photographer) Indrani Pal-Chaudhuri, director, photographer, social justice advocate, Canadian-British-Indian.
- Indrani Pal-Chaudhuri, director, photographer, social justice advocate, Canadian-British-Indian.
- Indrani Rahman (1930–1999), Indian dancer
- Indrani Dutta (born 1970), Indian actress
- Indrani Mukerjea (born 1972), INX Media CEO
- Indrani Paul (born 2000), Indian actress and model
- Indrani of Sambhupura

== List of people with the surname ==
- Seeta Indrani (born 1963) British actress and dancer
