= Paramashivaloka =

Paramashivaloka was a title given posthumously to:

- Yasovarman, king of Angkor (889–910)
- Jayavarman V, Emperor of Angkor (968–1001)
