= Viralakshmi =

Viralakshmi also called Narpatindralakshmi (10th-century - 11th-century), was a queen of the Khmer Empire, married to king Suryavarman I (r. 1006–1050) of the Khmer Empire. Her name Viralakshmi means ‘blessed with wealth of braveness ’.

She is recorded as a relative of Harshavarman I, but her precise relationship to him is not specified. She was in any event a member of the kamratem an or elite of the polity Vrai Kanlong, ‘forest of the kanlong’, and the sister of Narapatindravarman and Bhuvanaditya. She was possibly a daughter of Jayaviravarman, or a sister of Harshavarman I and Iśanavarman II.

Suryavarman I is noted to have ‘offered a tiara, earrings, clothes of gold, and all sorts of finery, and he also offered a covered palanquin of gold’ to Viralakshmi when he proposed marriage to her. Her brothers Narapatindravarman and Bhuvanaditya were given great privileges, and the latter made prince of Vanapura. The marriage is believed to have been of great help to Suryavarman I in attaining the throne.

Suryavarman I was succeeded in 1050 by Udayadityavarman II, who was possibly the younger brother of queen Viralakshmi, and who was previously named Bhuvanaditya. She was possibly the mother or the paternal aunt of queen Vijayendralakshmi.
