= Tribhuvanadevi =

Tribhuvanadevi, Queen of Campadesa

Tribhuvana Mahadevi or Tribhuvanadevi (late-9th century–early 10th century) was a Cham female leader and queen of Champa, the chief wife of king Jaya Simhavarman I (r. 897–904).

In Champa epigraphs, she was highly applauded by the king and her sons "foremost of all queen and virtuous." According to historical records, she was born to a noble Buddhist family of Quảng Trị origin. She was the daughter of Narendrādhipati, a byname of Rajadvara, a well accomplished minister who had served four Cham kings and had been awarded eulogization for his clan's contributions.

In 917 the queen erected the temple of Indrakānteśvara (Śiva) at Hà Trung, Quảng Trị province.
