= Jayavarman Kaundinya =

Past Fu-nan ruler

Jayavarman Kaundinya កៅណ្ឌិន្យជ័យវរ្ម័ន

King of Funan
- Reign: 484–514
- Predecessor: Sri Indravarman I
- Successor: Rudravarman (514–540); Kulaprabhavati (514–517)
- Spouse: Kulaprabhavati
- Issue: Guṇavarman; Rudravarman
- House: House of Kaundinya
- Dynasty: Varman
- Father: Kaundinya II
- Religion: Hinduism

Jayavarman Kaundinya (Khmer: កៅណ្ឌិន្យជ័យវរ្ម័ន, Kauṇḍinya Jayavarman) was a ruler of Funan. He died in 514.

== Biography ==
According to the Chinese annals, he reigned over a prosperous kingdom influenced by Shaivism, but at the same time other religions were equally well represented in his kingdom. An inscription was also attributed to his wife, Queen Kulaprabhavati, who laid the foundation of Vaishnavism in the kingdom.

On the other hand, two events confirm that Buddhism was also well established. The first concerns was his demand in 484 CE for military aid, delivered by a Buddhist monk named Nàqiéxiān/Nāgasena (那伽仙) to the emperor Wudi against the Kingdom of Lam Ap in Central Vietnam, guilty of boarding and looting the merchant ships of the country. Even if the request was rejected, the copy preserved by the Chinese archives shows a perfect knowledge of the Buddhist canon that only a thorough study can allow. The second index relates to the sending to China of two Buddhist monks, Mandrasena in 503 CE and Sanghapala in 508 CE.

Jayavarman Kaundinya sent two more embassies in middle empire in 511 CE and in 514 CE, the year of his death. According to inscription K. 40, his eldest son, Rudravarman, born of a concubine, then murdered the legitimate heir, Guṇavarman, to seize the throne and was the last ruler of Funan, that is mentioned in the Chinese annals; until at least 517 he was involved in a power struggle with his step mother, who was supported by his opponents.

== Sources ==
- COEDES 1948 lEHdIedI P57-60

George Cœdès (24 February 1992) [1948]. The Hindu States of Indochina and Indonesia. History of World (in French). Editions De Boccard. pp. 57–60. ISBN 9782701800462.

- PELLIOT BEFEO 1903 lFN P270-271

Paul Pelliot (1903). "The Fou-nan". Bulletin of the French School of the Far East (in French). 3 (1): 270–271. ISSN 1760-737X.

- DAGENS 2003 lK P25

(Khmer | chapter number=I | title chapter=The Khmer Country. The story | passage=25)

Preceded by Sri Indravarman I	King of Funan; 484–514	Succeeded by Rudravarman and Kulaprabhavati
