= Arahant Upatissa =

1st–2nd-century Sri Lankan Theravada Buddhist monk and author of the Vimuttimagga

- Occupation: Buddhist monk
- Era: 1st–2nd century CE
- Movement: Theravada Buddhism

Arahant Upatissa (1st century CE – 2nd century CE) was a Sri Lankan Theravada Buddhist monk and the author of The Path to Freedom, or Vimuttimagga, which serves as a Buddhist meditation manual, broadly considered a great and important work. It is similar to the Path of Purification, or Visuddhimagga by Buddhaghosa, but less analytical and more practical in its treatment of the traditional meditation objects. Both are commentaries, not from the Pali Canon, but very relevant to it, especially to the section of the Pali Canon called the Abhidhamma which contains the philosophical treatises of the Buddha.
