= Vimuttimagga =

1st century Buddhist text

- Type: Compendium text
- Parent: Pāli literature
- Compendium on: Sutta Piṭaka
- Composition: c. 1st–2nd century
- Attribution: Upatissa
- Abbreviation: Vim

The Vimuttimagga ("Path of Freedom") is a Buddhist practice manual, traditionally attributed to the Arahant Upatissa (c. 1st or 2nd century). It was translated into Chinese in the sixth century as the Jietuo dao lun 解脫道論 by Sanghapala. The original text (possibly Pali or Buddhist Hybrid Sanskrit) is no longer extant, but the work has survived in Chinese. The book was probably written in India and then later brought to Sri Lanka. Some doctrines of the Vimuttimagga have been associated with those attributed to the Abhayagiri monastery by Dhammapāla, but this has been disputed in recent scholarship.

== Contents ==
The Vimuttimagga recommends various meditation practices such as Anapanasati, Kasina meditation and Buddha-anussati - recollection of the virtues of the Buddha. Its chapters are (based on the translation by Ehara, Soma & Kheminda):

1. Introductory Discourse (referencing the three trainings and ultimate freedom)
2. On Distinguishing Virtue
3. On Austerities
4. On Distinguishing Concentration
5. On Approaching a Good Friend
6. The Distinguishing of Behaviour
7. The Distinguishing of the Subjects of Meditation
8. Entrance into the Subject of Meditation
9. The Five Forms of Higher Knowledge
10. On Distinguishing Wisdom
11. The Five Methods (aggregates, sense organs, elements, conditioned arising, truth)
12. On Discerning Truth

== Relationship to the Visuddhimagga ==
The Vimuttimagga bears a striking similarity to the Visuddhimagga by Buddhaghosa, and it is highly probable that it had an influence on Buddhaghosa. While the Visuddhimagga is a much longer work, both texts differ on several points. According to Bhikkhu Analayo, the Chinese version of the Vimuttimagga states that ascetic practices (dhutanga) can be unwholesome and wholesome while the Visuddhimagga denies that they can be unwholesome, although he notes that the Tibetan Vimuktimārga classifies ascetic practices as "wholesome". A similar difference can be seen with regards to concentration (samādhi) which the Vimuttimagga states can be wholesome or unwholesome (micchā samādhi/邪定) while the Visuddhimagga disagrees that it can be unwholesome. Another major difference is in the scheme of the progress of insight, which the Vimuttimagga arranges based on the Four Noble Truths and the Visuddhimagga arranges based on the seven purifications which stem from the Rathavinīta-sutta.

Minor differences can also be seen in the particular schemes of practice. Upatissa gives four categories of Śīla while Buddhagosa gives five. Upatissa gives four ways of cultivating Anapanasati, while Buddhagosa gives eight. In addition, the Visuddhimagga identifies forty subjects of meditation (kammatthana) while the Vimuttimagga identifies thirty-eight.

== See also ==
- Buddhaghosa
- Visuddhimagga
- Patisambhidamagga
- Samatha
- Vipassanā

== Notes ==
=== References ===
- Analayo, Bhikkhu (2009), "The Treatise on the Path to Liberation (解脫道論) and the Visuddhimagga" (PDF), Fuyan Buddhist Studies (4), ISSN 2070-0512
- Bapat, P.V. (1937), Vimuttimagga and Visuddhimagga - A Comparative Study
- Crosby, Kate (1999), "History versus Modern Myth: The Abhayagirivihāra, the Vimuttimagga and Yogāvacara Meditation", Journal of Indian Philosophy, 27 – via www.scribd.com
- Vajira, Sister; Story, Francis (1998), Maha-parinibbana Sutta: Last Days of the Buddha (DN 16), Access to Insight
