= Jyeṣṭhāryā =

Queen of Sambhupura
- Reign: c. 803
- Predecessor: Jayendrabhā
- Father: Jayavarman II
- Mother: Jayendrabhā

Jyestha or Jyeṣṭhāryā (9th-century), was a queen regnant of Sambhupura in Chenla in Cambodian history.

An inscription from Sambhupura dated 803 records consecutive queens. Coincidentally, the previous year, 802, is the founding date of the Angkor Empire.

Jyestha was the daughter of queen Jayaendra[valla]bha or Jayendrabhā of Sambhupura and king Jayavarman II, and half sister of king Jayavarman III, who was the son of Jayavarman II by Dharanindradevi. An inscription describes her as ‘the elder daughter of kanhen kamratan an Sri Jayendra[valla]bha, granddaughter of kanhen kamratan an Sri Nrpendradevi, great-granddaughter of vrah kamratan an Sri Indraloka’.

Jyestha, daughter of queen Jayaendra[valla]bha of Sambhupura, is attested as queen in 803. She appears to have inherited the throne from her mother, who had in turn inherited the throne from her mother, queen Nrpendradevi. It appears Jyestha ruled while her father Jayavarman II was busy, but the next ruler of Cambodia was her half brother Jayavarman III.

As monarch, Queen Jyestha formed the basis of a funerary cult; in 895 an emissary of the court noted in a matter concerning some slaves, that they were part of the property belonging to ‘the vrah kamraten an, the lady Jyestha’.

In the 9th-century, the capital of the new united Cambodia was relocated to the new city of Angkor Wat by king Yaśovarman I (r. 889–912), and there are no inscriptions noting any autonomously ruling female monarchs during the Khmer Empire. Queen Jyeṣṭhāryā may therefore have been the last female monarch in Cambodia until Queen Tey in the 17th-century.
