= Prithindravarman =

King of Champa, Vietnam (died 774)

Prithivindravarman
- raja-di-raja

King of Champa
- Reign: 758-770
- Predecessor: Lútuóluó
- Successor: Satyavarman
- Born: Nha Trang
- Died: 774; Virapura (Phan Rang)
Names
- Śrī Prithivindravarman
Posthumous name
- Rudraloka

Prithivindravarman (?–774) was a king of Champa, reigning from 758 to around 770.

The reign of Prithivindravarman marks the starting point of a Panduranga dynasty, with capital at Virapura (Phan Rang), south of Champa. The Simhapura dynasty of the Thu Bon River Valley which was established by Gangaraja (r. 413–?) abruptly came to end around 740s AD, without any explanation available. The center of Cham power shifted to the south.

The last Linyi tribute mission to the Tang court was in 749, sent by a ruler named Lútuóluó. After this, the Old Book of Tang said that Linyi changed its name to Huánwáng (環王國) during the Zhide reign era (756–8). But according to the Huanghua Sidaji 皇華四達記 (now lost), which was compiled around 800 by a Tang prime minister named Jia Dan, Huánwáng was a kingdom located around present-day Quảng Bình & Quảng Trị areas, 'four days walk from Huanzhou Vinh to the Tandong River (Gianh River), from which it took another six days to reach the capital of the country of Huánwáng', rather than the whole mandala Champa. Champa by that time had been fragmentary into several, independent, and sometimes competitive states, under the prestige of the king of kings.

The travel in Champa from the sea, said that the island of Zhànbùláo (Cù Lao Chàm or Cham Island, Sanf in Muslim travel accounts) 'situated 200 li east of the capital of Huánwáng. It took two days from Zhànbùláo to Mount Ling 陵山 (Lingaparvata), then one day to the country of Méndú 門毒國 (probably today Phú Yên), another day to reach Gǔdá 古笪國 (Kauṭhāra), and half day to reach the destination of Bēntuólàng 奔陀浪洲 (Pāṇḍuraṅga).' Perhaps that the Chinese presumably took the name of this northern Champa Principality to mistakenly attribute the name to the whole Champa.

Prithivindravarman initiated the worship of Lady Po Nagar, symbolized in Hinduism as Bhagavati. The temple of Po Nagar was built in Kauṭhāra (Nha Trang) in dedication to the worship of Lady Po Nagar and her Indianized form. He was succeeded by his sister's son Satyavarman (r. 770–787) in 770.

Champa was experiencing its amazing height of history in terms of prosperity, art, literature, and stability. Cham port cities dominated the maritime trade routes through the South China Sea, from India, the Middle East, to Southeast Asia, and to Tang China. In the section Tariq min janib Faris ila'l-Mashriq of Ibn Khurradadhbih's famous book al-Masālik wa-l-Mamālik, it is said that merchant ships sailing from Qmar (arguably Angkor) to Sanf (abbreviation for the Cham Island) took three days. Al-Mas'udi described 'cargo ships from Basra, Siraf, Oman, India, the islands of Zabaj, and Sanf came to the river mouth of Khanfu (the port city of Guangzhou) in China..' It was Cham port cities of Amaravati (Châu Sa), Simhapura (Trà Kiệu), Hoi An, Lý Sơn Island, and Panduranga where large quantities of Islamic pottery and Arab dinars dating from 7th–10th century AD have been recovered.

The life of Champa of that time was described as extremely lavish and peaceful.

In 774, Javanese raiders from the south launched a surprising seaborne invasion of Champa, plundering cities, stealing the golden statue of Bhagavati, and burning down the Po Nagar temple. Apparently Prithivindravarman was killed by the invaders amidst chaos. He was given the posthumous title Rudraloka.

== Bibliography ==
- Coedès, George (1975), Vella, Walter F. (ed.), The Indianized States of Southeast Asia, University of Hawaii Press, ISBN 978-0-824-80368-1
- Lafont, Pierre-Bernard (2007), Le Campā: Géographie, population, histoire, Indes savantes, ISBN 978-2-84654-162-6

| Preceded by Lutuoluo ?–? | King of Champa; 758–770 | Succeeded by Satyavarman 770–787? |
