= Houen Houei =

Houen Houei was a Javanese man, who, at the beginning of the 1st century CE, brought with him the cult of Vishnu to Champa. There, he married the Cham queen Leiou Ye. Houen Houei later established the kingdom of Lin Yi (Lam Ap), later known as Champa (Chiem Thanh). At this time, however, Lin Yi was known as the Chinese district of Tuong Lam (Forest of Elephants).

Preceded by Lady Po Nagar	Legendary King of Champa	Succeeded by ?
