= Jaya Simhavarman I =

- raja-di-raja

King of Champa
- Reign: 897-904
- Coronation: 897
- Predecessor: Indravarman II
- Successor: Saktivarman
- Born: Unknown; Indrapura, Champa
- Died: 904; Indrapura, Champa
- Spouse: Tribhuvanadevi; Surendradevi
- Issue: Saktivarman
Names
- Śrī Jaya Siṃhavarmadeva
- Dynasty: Bhrgu dynasty
- Religion: Saivite & Vaisnite Hinduism, Mahayana Buddhism

Jaya Simhavarman I was a king of mandala Champa, reigning from 897 to 904. He was preceded by his uncle Indravarman II (r. ?–893).

Simhavarman had many building projects during his reign: a Mahayana monastery named vihara Pramuditalokeśvara in Quảng Nam was built in 902 in dedicating to Avalokiteśvara, sponsored by a royal member, the future Bhadravarman II (r. 905–917); a shrine and the installation of silver icon for Avalokiteśvara in the city of Vrddha Ratnapura (present-day Đại Hữu, Quảng Bình, three statues of Prajñaparamita and two of Avalokiteśvara have been recovered); constructions in Mỹ Sơn and Khương Mỹ, such as Mỹ Sơn A12, A13, B2, E4. Syncretic Saivaism-Buddhism had been developed in this context, which associated Buddha and Bodhisattvas were seen as the saviors in that religious system, presided over by Śiva as the supreme protector.

Architectural influence from Java (which at the time ruled by the Mahayana Shailendras who were former trade rivals of Champa), could be related to Po Klung Pilih Räjadvära, a Cham nobleman, relative of Simhavarman's wife, and a well-known minister of Cham court. Räjadvära went on a pilgrimage to Java in 908.

Jaya Simhavarman was succeeded by his son Saktivarman (r. 904), who reigned very brief, followed by Bhadravarman II.

== Bibliography ==
- Coedès, George (1975), Vella, Walter F. (ed.), The Indianized States of Southeast Asia, University of Hawaii Press, ISBN 978-0-824-80368-1
- Lafont, Pierre-Bernard (2007), Le Campā: Géographie, population, histoire, Indes savantes, ISBN 978-2-84654-162-6

Preceded by Indravarman II ?–893	King of Champa; 897?–904	Succeeded by Saktivarman 904
