= Jaya Indravarman II =

- Raja-di-raja

King of Champa
- Reign: 1080-1081
- Coronation: 1080
- Predecessor: Harivarman IV
- Successor: Paramabhodhisatva

King of Champa (second time)
- Reign: 1086-1113
- Predecessor: Paramabhodhisatva
- Successor: Harivarman V
- Born: 1071; Indrapura, Champa
- Died: 1113 (age 42); Indrapura
Names
- Prince Vak yāṅ Devatāmurtti
Regnal name
- Yāṅ pom̃ ku Śrī Jaya Indravarmmadeva Devatāmurtti
Posthumous name
- Paramabuddhaloka
- Dynasty: Harivarmanid dynasty
- Father: Harivarman IV
- Mother: ?
- Religion: Hinduism

Jaya Indravarman II or Prince Vak (1071–1113), was a king of Champa, ruling the kingdom for two periods, from 1080 to 1081, and from 1086 to until his death in 1113.

Young Prince Vak was enthroned in 1080 by his father Harivarman IV as a nine-year-old boy, "did not know how to govern the kingdom properly and did everything contrary to the rules of the government," was considered not eligible to rule. His uncle, Prince Pang, exercised power as the court regent, then crowned himself as king Paramabhodisattva of Champa in 1081.

Five years later, Jaya Indravarman II launched a coup and dethroned his ruling uncle, then reestablished himself back to the crown. Indravarman II resumed the relationship with the Song dynasty. In 1103, Lý Giác, a Vietnamese wizard who previously rebelled against king Lý Nhân Tông then fled to Champa as a refugee, persuaded the king to set out and retake three northern provinces that were believed to have lost to Dai Viet during previous decades. Jaya Indravarman II's campaign was successful at first, but he was only able to hold them for several months before leaving these provinces back to the Dai Viet.

Indravarman II's reign continued peacefully until his death in 1113. During that time, he restored temples and infrastructures in My Son and initiated the elaboration of the Thap Mam Style. He was succeeded by one of his nephews, Harivarman V.

== Bibliography ==
- Coedès, George (1975), Vella, Walter F. (ed.), The Indianized States of Southeast Asia, University of Hawaii Press, ISBN 978-0-824-80368-1
- Lafont, Pierre-Bernard (2007), Le Campā: Géographie, population, histoire, Indes savantes, ISBN 978-2-84654-162-6

Preceded by Paramabhodhisatva 1081–1086	King of Champa; 1080–1081/1086–1113	Succeeded by Harivarman V 1113–1129
