= Rudravarman III =

- raja-di-raja

King of Champa
- Reign: 1062–1069/74
- Coronation: 1062
- Predecessor: Bhadravarman III
- Successor: Harivarman IV
- Died: Phan Rang
Names
- Yāṅ poṅ ku Śrī Rudravarmadeva
- Religion: Hinduism

Rudravarman III (Chinese: 施里律律茶盤麻帝楊溥; pinyin: Shīlǐ Lülǜchápánmádì Yáng Pǔ) was a medieval king of Champa, ruled the kingdom from 1062 to 1069/1074.

Rudravarman III was a grandson of king Jaya Paramesvaravarman I (r. 1044–1060). His predecessor and also the older brother was Bhadravarman III (r. 1060–1061), who ruled for a very brief time before stepping down and transferring the crown to Rudravarman, who was in Phan Rang. He built many temples around Po Nagar (Nha Trang).

Rudravarman was reportedly sending delegations to the Song Empire in 1062 and 1068, and to Dai Viet in 1063, 1065, 1068. Georges Maspero believes that in late 1068 Rudravarman provoked war with the Dai Viet king Ly Thanh Tong, which led to a Vietnamese raid on Vijaya Champa next year. In recently, historian Michael Vickery presents evidence that the incursion of Dai Viet in 1069 was not staged against Rudravarman and the city of Vijaya (Xinzhou 新州 in the Zhu Fan Zhi), but possibly against a local Cham chief (known by the Vietnamese as "Chế Củ") in Amaravati (Jiuzhou 舊州). Excerpt from the Song Huiyao Jigao describes the 1060s: "Champa and Cambodia (Zhenla), who are neighbors of Jiaozhi, have never been practiced in warfare. They frequently suffer from invasions and occupation. However, in recent times, Champa has been developing its military defenses in order to guard against Jiaozhi."

Albeit the 15th-century Vietnamese chronicle Đại Việt sử ký toàn thư also claims that after the successful raid against Champa in 1069, Rudravarman III switched to be a vassal of Dai Viet, and paid annual tributes to the Dai Viet court from 1071 to 1074, but till this day that passage arguably remains in question, because no piece of evidence has been found to back it. It was however plausible that after 1069, Champa suffered a violent civil war between the elites in Nha Trang and Phan Rang that crippled the mandalas, making it vulnerable for foreign invasion. By 1074, Harivarman IV, a Cham prince of both Coconut and Areca clans bloodline, with his brother, prince Pang, had defeated all antagonist factions, and reunified Champa.

== Bibliography ==
- Coedès, George (1975), Vella, Walter F. (ed.), The Indianized States of Southeast Asia, University of Hawaii Press, ISBN 978-0-824-80368-1
- Lafont, Pierre-Bernard (2007), Le Campā: Géographie, population, histoire, Indes savantes, ISBN 978-2-84654-162-6
- Maspero, Georges (2002), The Champa Kingdom, White Lotus Co., Ltd, ISBN 978-97475-3-499-3

Preceded by Bhadravarman III 1060–1061	King of Champa; 1062–1069?/1074?	Succeeded by Harivarman IV 1074–1080
