= Sanghapala =

Buddhist monk and translator

Sanghapala ភិក្ខុសង្ឃបាល
- Title: Preah Phikho

Personal life
- Born: 460 Funan
- Died: 524 (age 64) Jiankang, Eastern Wu

Religious life
- Religion: Buddhism
- School: Theravada ?

Senior posting
- Teacher: Guṇavṛddhī

Sanghapāla (466–524 CE) was a famous Khmer monk who traveled to Southern and Northern Dynasties China.

He, along with the fellow Funan monk, Mandrasena, translated Buddhist scriptures such as the Vimuttimagga or Path to Freedom into Chinese.

He is one of the only two Cambodian monks whose translations currently figure in the ChineseTripitaka.

== Identification ==
In Chinese, he is known as Sengjia-Poluo (僧伽婆羅). Sanghapala's Khmer name can also rendered as two possible Sanskrit equivalents, Sanghabara or Sanghavarman.

== Biography ==
Sanghapala was born in Funan in the year 460 AD, in the modern day Kingdom of Cambodia. He became a monk in his teens and traveled to China where he lived in Jiankang, nowadays Nanking, the capital city of Southern Qi dynasty during that time. He was discipled by Guṇavṛddhī, a certain Indian monk who had travelled to China during the reign of Emperor Wu of Liang who intended to propagate Buddhism to China as King Ashoka had done for India. He acquired the knowledge of many languages including Pali, Sanskrit and classical Chinese.

Pala was clean of body and of mind and was reluctant to engage in conversation. In the seclusion of his room he stayed and worked, taking a very simple fare.

— Zokukosoden, Further Biographies of Famous Clerics, number 2060, volume 50 of the Taisho edition of the Chinese Tripitaka.

He was then sponsored by the court of Jiankang to translate new works into Chinese as early as 506. Among others, Sanghapala was ordered to write a new translation known as Ayuwang jing, or the Scripture of King Aśoka (T.2043) from the original Ashokavadana, an Indian Sanskrit-language text that describes the birth and reign of the third Mauryan Emperor Ashoka. He worked as an official translator for 16 years and established offices in five different locations, one of which was now as "The Funan Desk".

Sanghapala died at the age of 65 in 524 AD.

== Legacy: the Chinese translation of lost Pali texts ==
Edwin G. Pulleyblank suggests that Sanghapala dictated his Chinese translations of the dharani to two of his collaborators known as Fayun and Baochang. His rendition of Sanskrit was probably influenced by his mother-tongue which was Old Khmer, though his discipleship with an Indian master guarantees that his knowledge of the language was checked. Misinterpretations in his translations and confusion of similar sounding words have been noted in his works. He translated the Maha Asoka Sutra, Vimoksa-Marga-sastra, and others, but most notoriously, his Chinese translation is a canonical reference for the Vimuttimagga or Path to Freedom. According to the catalogue of the Chinese translations of the Buddhist Tripitaka established by Nanjō Bun'yū in 1883, all of the texts translated by Sanghamala are relative to the Mahayana, which was practised in Cambodia until the end of the reign of Jayavarman VII, until it was replaced by a majority Theravada Buddhism until this day.

== Bibliography ==
There are nine works of Sanghapala in the catalogue of the Chinese translations of the Buddhist Tripitaka established by Nanjō Bun'yū, namely,

- No. 22 Saptaśatikā Prajñāpāramitā (S. M.).
- N. 29 Dasadharmaka
- N. 56 Sarvabuddhavishayāvatāra
- N. 301 Ashtabuddhaka
- N. 308 Mahamayuri Vidyaragni
- N. 353 Anantamukha-nirhāra-dhāraṇī
- N. 442 Mañjuśrī pariprikkha
- N. 1103 Bodhisattvapiṭaka Sūtra
- N. 1293 Vimuttimagga or Vimoksha-marga-sastra as the Sanskrit rendering of the Chinese title gives it

== See also ==
- List of Buddhists
