= Indravarman I (Champa) =

- raja-di-raja

King of Champa
- Reign: 787-801
- Coronation: 787
- Predecessor: Satyavarman
- Successor: Harivarman I
- Born: Unknown; Champa
- Died: 802; Kauthara
Names
- Śrī Indravarman

Indravarman I was the ruling king of Champa from 787 to 801. He ascended the position king of kings after his elder brother Satyavarman (r. 770–787).

The Javanese (identified as javavalasaṅgha), after learning Satyavarman's death and the new king of Champa, launched the second incursion along southern Champa (now southern Vietnam coast). The Javanese sacked the capital of Virapura (Phan Rang), destroying temples of Hoa Lai dedicating for Bhadrādhipatīśvara west of Virapura. They plundered temples, towns, taking many spoils and women back to Java. The Javanese however still occupied Panduranga until being driven off by Indravarman in 799. The king restored the temple.

In 793 he sent an embassy to China.

Indravarman is known to have ruled until 801, and was succeeded by Harivarman I (r. 802–817), his brother-in-law.

== Bibliography ==
- Coedès, George (1975), Vella, Walter F. (ed.), The Indianized States of Southeast Asia, University of Hawaii Press, ISBN 978-0-824-80368-1
- Lafont, Pierre-Bernard (2007), Le Campā: Géographie, population, histoire, Indes savantes, ISBN 978-2-84654-162-6

| Preceded by Satyavarman 770–787 | King of Champa; 787–801 | Succeeded by Harivarman I 802–817 |
