= Vikrantavarman IV =

- raja-di-raja

King of Champa
- Reign: 1030-1041
- Coronation: 1030
- Predecessor: unknown
- Successor: Jaya Sinhavarman II
- Born: Unknown; Champa
- Died: 1041; Champa
- Issue: Jaya Simhavarman II
Names
- Yāṅ poṅ ku Śrī Vikrāntavarmadeva
- Father: Paramesvaravarman II
- Mother: ?

Vikrāntavarman IV (Chinese: 陽補孤施離皮蘭德加拔麻曡; pinyin: Yáng Bǔ Gū Shīlí Pílándéjiābámádié (Note: The name is provided in the History of Song, and in the Tribute records section of Song Huiyao Jigao.)), was a king of Champa, allegedly reigning from 1030 to 1041. Pílándéjiābámádié succeeded after a king named Yang Pu Ku Sri (Chinese: 楊卜俱室離, pinyin: Yáng Bǔ Jù Shìlí).

In October 1030, Vikrantavarman IV sent a diplomatic delegation to the emperor of China, along with tributes of enormous amount of exotic putchuk (Dolomiaea costus or Indian costus), turtle shells, frankincense, ivory, rhino horns. His reign was apparently struggling with hardship and nothing more is known about him.

His succeeding son and crown prince was Jaya Simhavarman II (r. 1041–1044).

== Bibliography ==
- Coedès, George (1975), Vella, Walter F. (ed.), The Indianized States of Southeast Asia, University of Hawaii Press, ISBN 978-0-824-80368-1

Preceded by unknown 1018?–1030?	King of Champa; 1030?–1041?	Succeeded by Jaya Simhavarman II 1041?–1044?
