= Kulaprabhavati =

Queen regnant of Funan

Kulaprabhavati កុលប្រភាវតី
- Queen Kulaprabhavati

Queen regnant of Funan
- Reign: 514–517
- Predecessor: Jayavarman Kaundinya
- Successor: Rudravarman
- Contender: Rudravarman

Queen consort of Funan
- Tenure: ?–514
- Spouse: Jayavarman Kaundinya
- Issue: Gunavarman
- House: House of Kaundinya
- Dynasty: Varman
- Religion: Hindu

Kulaprabhavati (Khmer: កុលប្រភាវតី, ALA-LC: Kulaprabhāvatī; 6th-century CE, ) was a queen regnant of Funan (in present-day Cambodia) from 514 to 517. She was first the principal queen of King Jayavarman and later a queen in her own right.

== Biography ==
She was married to King Jayavarman Kaundinya of Funan, one of the first historically attested monarchs in Cambodian history. Kulaprabhavati is referred to in an inscription as ‘the great queen, principal spouse of King Jayavarman’.

The Chinese account History of the Liang states that king Jayavarman of Funan died in 514, and ‘the son of a concubine, Rudravarman, killed his younger brother, son of the legitimate wife, and ascended the throne’.

It is attested that Jayavarman had another son named Gunavarman, and since all inscriptions mentioning Gunavarman and Kulaprabhavati are Vaishnavite, it is possible that Gunavarman was the son of queen Kulaprabhavati and king Jayavarman, and the younger son was murdered by his half brother Rudravarman, who appears to have been a follower of Shiva rather than Vishnu.

In 517, king Rudravarman sent his first emissaries to China and was recognized by China's emperor as the king of Funan. At this point, he lamented that his accession in Funan was contested. It appears that the death of king Jayavarman resulted in a three year long succession war between king Rudravarman and his stepmother queen Kulaprabhavati, who herself claimed the throne after the death of her spouse, and was supported by some of the elite before she was defeated by her stepson. The Chinese would not have recorded this, since female monarchs was something which was not possible in Chinese eyes prior to the accession of Empress Wu Zetian.

She was the first queen in Cambodia noted to have been an autonomous wielder of the ultimate political authority since the legendary Queen Soma, as well as the last female ruler in Cambodia until Kambuja-raja-lakshmi and Jayadevi.

Preceded by Jayavarman Kaundinya	Queen regnant of Funan; 514-517	Succeeded by Rudravarman
