= Harivarman IV =

King of Champa

Jaya Harivarman IV
- Raja-di-raja

King of Champa
- Reign: 1074-1080
- Coronation: 1074
- Predecessor: Rudravarman III
- Successor: Jaya Indravarman II
- Born: Unknown; Quang Nam, Champa
- Died: 1081; Indrapura
- Issue: Jaya Indravarman II (Prince Vak)
Names
- Prince Thäng; Vishnumürti; Mädhavamürti; Devatämürti
Regnal name
- Yām̃ po ku vijaya Śrī Harivarmmadeva
- Dynasty: Harivarmanid dynasty
- Religion: Hinduism

Harivarman IV or Prince Thäng (?–1081), Sanskrit name Vishnumürti, was the ruling king of Champa from 1074 to 1080. His father was a noble belonging to the Coconut clan (northern tribes), and his mother was a member of the Areca clan (southern tribes).

== Rise to power ==
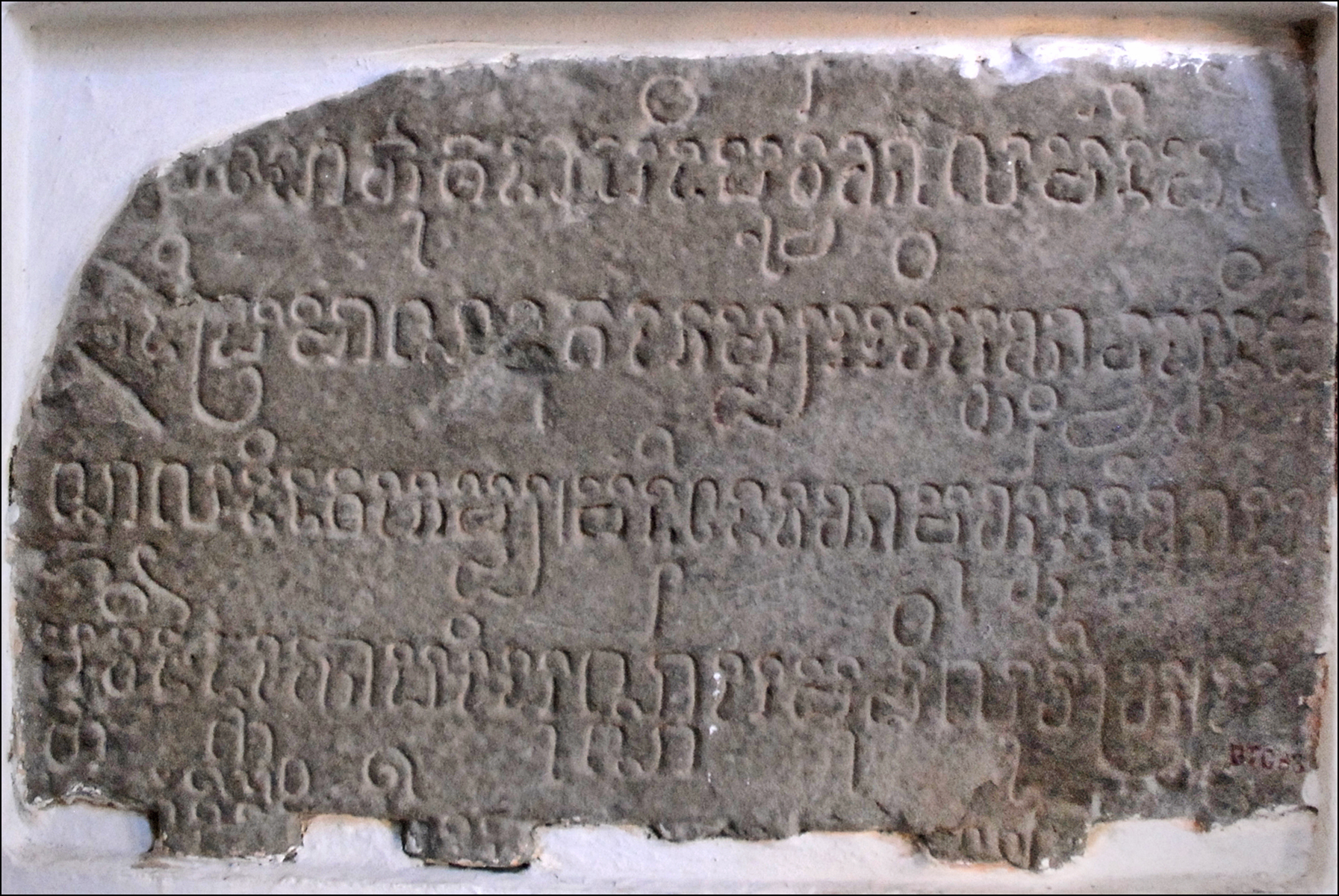
One of inscriptions erected by Harivarman IV from Chien Dan

Rudravarman III (r. 1062–1074) was tyrant king. He estranged the Nha Trang elites, agitating a chaotic civil war between the Phan Rang and the Nha Trang aristocrats in 1069. Champa then transitioned into a turbulent period of chaos caused by the reign of Rudravarman. The war had left Champa completely devastated.

From the north, two brothers Prince Thäng and Prince Pang, who descended from the Coconut clan (narikelavamsa, northern tribes) and the Areca clan (kramukavamsa, southern tribes) triumphantly defeated all enemies and warlord factions, and reunified Champa.

== Reign ==
Prince Thäng was crowned king Harivarman of Champa at Chiem Son (near Tra Kieu) in 1074, declaring himself protector of Champa, establishing a new dynasty. He set about rebuilding the kingdom: he constructed a capital, restoring the citadel of Tralauṅ Svon and streamlined state welfare and happiness.

=== Reform and building ===
Harivarman was described as having ‘originalish mind’ and ‘want to make Champa as a great power again’ like, therefore he restored the ancient city of Simhapura (former capital of Champa from c. 400 to 750 AD), rebuiding many religious foundations in My Son, including the temple of Bhadresvara. He donated the local deities foreign war prisoners and trophies after his military victories. He reformed the fiscal system, strengthening Champa's might and prosperity, honestly surpassed the pre-civil war period.

=== Diplomacy ===
In 1074, Champa under Harivarman raid the border of Dai Viet. In 1075, Harivarman defeated a Dai Viet's raid led by Chancellor Ly Thuong Kiet. He refused to cooperate with the Song dynasty and the Khmer Empire in a joint-campaign against Dai Viet in 1076, instead he made peace with the Dai Viet.

Subsequently, Harshavarman III of the Khmer Empire sent Prince Nandavarmadeva as the commander leading a Khmer army to attack northern Champa, sacking cities and temples, and looting many in My Son. Harivarman routed the invaders at the Battle of Somesvara, and Prince Nandavarmadeva was captured alive as a war prisoner. In 1080, Cham army under Harivarman and his younger brother, Prince Pang, later known as Paramabodhisattva (r. 1081–1086), launched a counter invasion of Cambodia, where they plundered the city of Sambhupura (Sambor) on the Mekong River.

=== Matrilinealism ===
In his textual epitaph, Harivarman praises indigenous Cham traditions of matrilinealism while the text was written in Sanskrit, which, very conflicted with Indian traditions, through he was a very religious man.

== Retirement and succession ==
Harivarman stepped down in 1080 and chose his nine-year-old son Prince Väk as heir, crowned as Jaya Indravarman II (r. 1080–81, 1086–1113). He then entered esoteric religious life, and died in 1081. The deceased king's funeral took place on a pyre according to the tradition of Sati, with his first-queen and second-rank queen. The inexperienced young Jaya Indravarman II, "did not know how to govern the kingdom properly and did everything contrary to the rules of the government", was deposed by his uncle and chief regent, Prince Pang.

== Bibliography ==
- Coedès, George (1975), Vella, Walter F. (ed.), The Indianized States of Southeast Asia, University of Hawaii Press, ISBN 978-0-824-80368-1
- Griffiths, Arlo; Lepoutre, Amandine; Southworth, William A.; Phần, Thành (2012), The inscriptions of Campā at the Museum of Cham sculpture in Đà Nẵng / Văn khắc Chămpa tại bảo tàng điêu khắc Chăm – Đà Nẵng, Vietnam National University in Ho Chi Minh City Publishing House (published in collaboration with EFEO and the Center for Vietnamese and Southeast Asian Studies, Hồ Chí Minh City)
- Lafont, Pierre-Bernard (2007), Le Campā: Géographie, population, histoire, Indes savantes, ISBN 978-2-84654-162-6
- Maspero, Georges (2002), The Champa Kingdom, White Lotus Co., Ltd, ISBN 978-97475-3-499-3

Preceded by Rudravarman III 1062–1069?/74	King of Champa; 1074–1080	Succeeded by Jaya Indravarman II 1080–1081
