= Jayendrabhā =

Queen of Sambhupura
- Reign: c. 780s
- Predecessor: Nṛpatendradevī
- Successor: Jyeṣṭhāryā

Queen consort of Lower Chenla (Water Chenla)
- Tenure: c. 8th-century
- Spouse: Jayavarman II
- Issue: Jyeṣṭhāryā
- Father: Rajendravarman I
- Mother: Nṛpatendradevī

Jayendrabhā or Jayaendra[valla]bha (8th-century - 9th-century), was a queen regnant of Sambhupura in Chenla in Cambodian history. She was also the queen of Jayavarman II, the king of Lower Chenla.

She was the daughter of queen Nṛpatendradevī or Nrpendradevi of Sambhupura. She appears to have inherited the throne from her mother. She married king Jayavarman II.

Jayavarman, the ruler of Lower Chenla, became King consort of Sambhupura by marrying her.

Her daughter queen Jyeṣṭhāryā succeeded her on the throne by 803.
