= Harivarman I =

King of Champa

- Raja-di-raja; Śrī Campāpura Parameçvara (Protector of Champa)

King of Champa
- Reign: 802-817
- Coronation: 803
- Predecessor: Indravarman I
- Successor: Vikrantavarman III
- Born: Champa
- Died: Kauthara
Names
- Śrī Harivarman Deva Rajadhiraja

Harivarman I was the king of Champa from around 802 to 817. During the period from 758 to 859 AD, mandala Champa was collectively called as Huánwáng by the Chinese, which obviously was not the proper name of Champa.

Harivarman was the brother-in-law of king Indravarman I (r. 787–801), a pacifist king. He came to power in 802. From 813 to 817, he and the military commanders Senäpati Panroe and Senäpati Pamr constructed the temple of Po Nagar in Nha Trang, three kalan at Hòa Lai (Thuận Bắc, Ninh Thuận), near Phan Rang (Panrang), former Pāṇḍuraṅga. These three towers were built entirely by reddish bricks, having been abandoned for a long time and are still in good preserving conditions. This Cham realistic architecture school is dubbed as "Hòa Lai style", and the remains at Pô Dam (Tuy Phong, Bình Thuận), Mỹ Sơn A'1, A'2 and F3 also belong to this style. Under Harivarman, the first Cham script inscriptions were engraved, gradually replacing Sanskrit.

Unlike the predecessor, Harivarman was a war-like hawkish king. In 803, northern Cham principality of Huánwáng (Quảng Bình & Quảng Trị), being incited by the king of kings, made a war provocation against Tang Empire's province of Annan (Northern Vietnam). Champa by the time of 700s AD had been split into several small domains, and its political structure was functioning like a confederation, or network, of smaller kingdoms (mandala).

Huanwang seized two counties of Annan. In 809, Chinese governor of Annan, Zhang Zhou, counterattacked Huanwang and recovered lost counties. The Huanwang army was badly defeated: 30,000 prisoners of war, Cham king's son and 59 of his officials were taken. However Harivarman declared his victory over the Chinese: 'his strong arm was the sun that expelled the darkness which was the Cinas'. The king also ordered Senäpati Pamr to invade Cambodia, who also claimed his campaign result as victorious.

Harivarman made his son Vikrantavarman III (r. 817–?) in charge of governing Pāṇḍuraṅga independently in 813. Pāṇḍuraṅga then became a feudatory of mandala Champa. When Harivarman died in 817, Vikrantavarman III ascended to the throne of Champa.

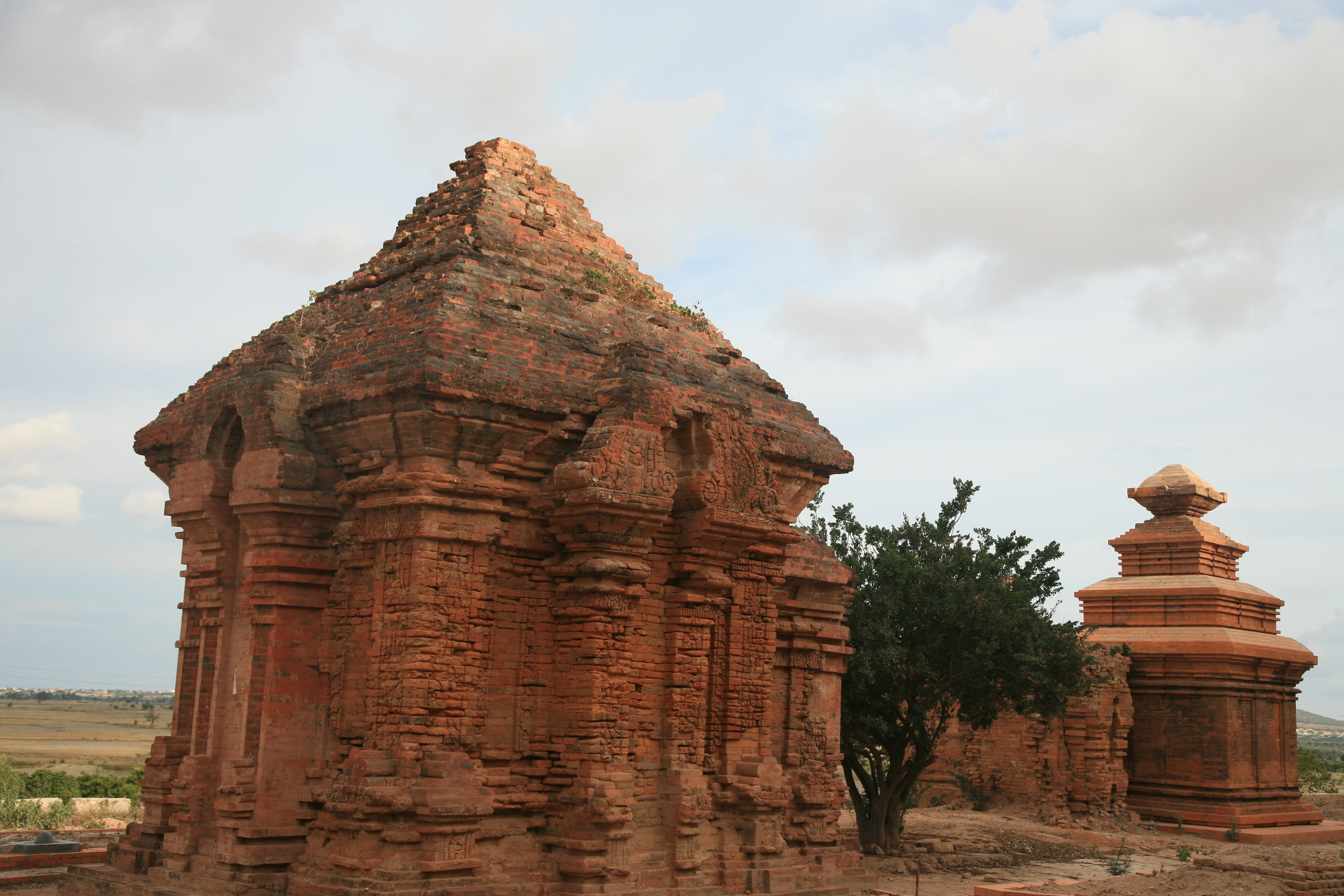
Hoa Lai style Po Dom sanctuary in Binh Thuan

== Bibliography ==
- Coedès, George (1975), Vella, Walter F. (ed.), The Indianized States of Southeast Asia, University of Hawaii Press, ISBN 978-0-824-80368-1
- Lafont, Pierre-Bernard (2007), Le Campā: Géographie, population, histoire, Indes savantes, ISBN 978-2-84654-162-6
- Taylor, Keith Weller (1983), The Birth of the Vietnam, University of California Press, ISBN 978-0-52007-417-0

Preceded by Indravarman I 787–801	King of Champa; 802–817	Succeeded by Vikrantavarman III 817–854?
