= Jaya Paramesvaravarman I =

Jaya Parameśvaravarman I
- Raja-di-raja; King cakravartin

King of Champa
- Reign: 1044-1060
- Coronation: 1044
- Predecessor: Jaya Simhavarman II
- Successor: Bhadravarman III
- Born: Unknown; Champa
- Died: 1060; Po Nagar, Nha Trang (Aia Trang), Champa
Names
- Īśvaramūrti
Regnal name
- Yām̃ po ku Śrī Jaya Parameśvaravarmadeva
- Father: ?
- Mother: ?
- Religion: Hinduism

Jaya Paramesvaravarman I (Chinese: 俱舍唎波微收羅婆麻提楊卜; pinyin: Jù shě(ī)lì Bōwēishōuluópómátí Yáng Bǔ), personal name Īśvaramūrti, was a king of Champa, reigning from 1044 to 1060. He founded a dynasty that centralized around Nha Trang and Phan Rang, which would dominantly rule mandala Champa until 1074.

After a shocking Vietnamese raid in northern Champa that quaked the kingdom and the ruling Jaya Simhavarman II supposedly died, a military commander born from a noble family of warrior traditions who had been vassals of precedent rulers, ascended the crown himself as Jaya Parameśvaravarman in 1044. This dynasty claimed to be descended from the mythical Uroja, also called Po Yan Ina Nagar.

In the south, people of the Principality of Panduranga (Ninh Thuận & Bình Thuận) revolted against Paramesvaravarman, because the Principality had selected a prince from Phan Rang to be the king of kings, and refused to recognize Paramesvaravarman's authority.

In 1050, Paramesvaravarman sent his nephew, the Crown Prince with title Sri Devaräja Mahäsenäpati (his real name is unknown), to quell off the Panduranga rebellion. The rebels were defeated on the field, many fleeing to mountains. The rebellion was ultimately pacified. The Crown Prince took rebel captives, dividing them into two groups, first to rebuild the city of Panrang (Phan Rang), second to serve at temples and monasteries. Paramesvaravarman then celebrated the victory over rebels by erecting inscriptions and lingas to commemorate his accomplishments in Po Klong Garai Temple.

In the same year the king moved his court to Nha Trang. He renovated the temple of Po Nagar. Envoys were sent to Song Empire in 1050; 1053 delegation was accompanied by Pú Sīmǎyīng (Abu Ismail?) and Liang Bao; 1056 by Pú Xītuópá (?).

During his latter years, a Śrī Yuvaräja Mahäsenäpati claimed of having conquered the Khmer city of Sambhupura, where his forces destroyed all Khmer temples and looted them, making them donations to the refurbishing temple of Śrīśānabhadreśvara at My Son.

His successor was a grandson named Bhadravarman III (r. 1060–1061), who only reigned for two years, then was succeeded by his younger brother Rudravarman III (r. 1062–1069/74).

== Bibliography ==
- Coedès, George (1975), Vella, Walter F. (ed.), The Indianized States of Southeast Asia, University of Hawaii Press, ISBN 978-0-824-80368-1
- Golzio, Karl-Heinz (2004), Inscriptions of Campā based on the editions and translations of Abel Bergaigne, Étienne Aymonier, Louis Finot, Édouard Huber and other French scholars and of the work of R. C. Majumdar. Newly presented, with minor corrections of texts and translations, together with calculations of given dates, Shaker Verlag
- Lafont, Pierre-Bernard (2007), Le Campā: Géographie, population, histoire, Indes savantes, ISBN 978-2-84654-162-6

Preceded by Jaya Simhavarman II 1041?–1044?	King of Champa; 1044?–1060	Succeeded by Bhadravarman III 1060–1061
