= Jayavarman IX =

- King of the Khmer Empire
- Reign: 1327 – 1336
- Predecessor: Indrajayavarman
- Successor: Trasak Paem
- Spouse: Angrajadevi
- Issue: Chandravati
Names
- Jayavarmadiparamesvara
- Dynasty: Varman Dynasty (Cambodia)
- Father: Indrajayavarman
- Religion: Hinduism (Shaivism)

Jayavarman IX (Khmer: ជ័យវរ្ម័នទី៩), also known as Jayavarmadiparamesvara, was the sovereign of the Khmer Empire from 1327 to 1336.

Jayavarman IX was like his father, Indrajayavarman, a convinced Shivaite.

This sovereign is the last king mentioned by inscriptions on the monuments. The last Sanskrit inscription of Cambodia dates from the reign of Jayavarman Parameshwara.
