= Kaundinya II =

Past Fu-nan ruler

Kaundinya II កៅណ្ឌិន្យទី២
- Kaundinyavarman

King of Funan
- Reign: 410
- Predecessor: Candana (Zhāntán)
- Successor: Srindravarman
- Spouse: Kuldina Devi
- Issue: Kaundinyajayavarman
- House: House of Kaundinya
- Dynasty: Varman
- Father: Candana (Zhāntán)
- Religion: Hinduism

Kaundinya II (Khmer: កៅណ្ឌិន្យទី២, Latin: Kaundinyavarman Chinese: 僑陳如; pinyin: Qiáochénrú), was a ruler from the house of Kaudinya, Varman dynasty of the Phnom or Funan kingdom.

== Biography ==
He was the son of King Candana (Chinese: 旃檀; pinyin: Zhāntán), who was descended from King Kaundinya I. During his reign about 410 AD, he married his queen. The son born to her was Kaundinyajayavarman (Khmer: ព្រះបទកៅណ្ឌិន្យជ័យវរ្ម័ន, Latin: Kaundinya jayavarman) and died in 434 AD.

Preceded by Candana (Zhāntán)	King of Funan; 410~434	Succeeded by Srindravarman I
