= Vijayendralakshmi =

Cambodian queen from 1080–1113

Vijayendralakshmi (11th-century – 12th-century), was a queen of the Khmer Empire, married to king Jayavarman VI (r. 1080–1107) and king Dharanindravarman I (r. 1107–1113) of the Khmer Empire.

She was born in Amalakasthala and the younger sister of Nrpendradhipativarman, who was the head of the army. It is possible that her brother Nrpendradhipativarman helped Jayavarman VI in a campaign against Harshavarman III or his successor, and that she and her brother were the children of Udayadityavarman II or one of the two younger sisters of queen Viralakshmi, and that she brought with her the sovereignty over Yaśodharapura.

She was described as ‘the receptacle of riches, beauty, eloquence and affection’, and ‘because she was considered the fruit of Fortune and Victory [lakshmi and vijaya], she bore the name Vijayendralakshmi’.

She married first the yuvaraja of Mahidharapura, then to Jayavarman VI and finally to Dharanindravarman I.

"Between her and the celestial Lakshmi, there was no difference, and neither of them could prove their superiority over the other. It was from this thought that the yuvaraja, about to set forth for the heavens, gave her to his brother, King Jayavarman VI. As a result of familial affection, when King Jayavarman followed his ancestors and the yuvaraja to the heavens, he gave her to Dharanindravarman I."

She was the only woman in the Khmer Empire to have married three kings in succession. It is noted that ‘She obtained, through the favour of the king named Jayavarmadeva, and in accord with the promise of the yuvaraja, Amalakasthala, which was her birth-place’. Her brother was described as ‘brother-in-law of his friend the yuvaraja, then favourite of Jayavarmadeva’.
