= Rudravarman =

King of Funan (6th c.)

Rudravarman រុទ្រវម៌្ម
- 'King'

King of Funan
- Reign: 514–540
- Predecessor: Jayavarman Kaundinya
- Successor: Dynasty abolished, probably Bhavavarman I of Chenla
- Contender: Kulaprabhavati (514–517)
- House: House of Kaundinya
- Dynasty: Varman
- Father: Jayavarman Kaundinya
- Mother: Jayavarman Kaundinya's concubine
- Religion: Hinduism

Rudravarman (Khmer: រុទ្រវម៌្ម, Rudravarman Chinese: 留陁跋摩; pinyin: Liútuóbámó), was the last king of Funan.

== Biography ==
Rudravarman was the last king of Funan, as mentioned by the Chinese annals. He was a descendant of Kaundinya I and Queen Soma, as per Baksei Chamkrong inscription, dated 947 CE.

Rudravarman was the eldest son of Jayavarman Kaundinya and was born of a concubine. After the death of his father, he murdered the legitimate heir, his half-brother Gunavarman, and seized the throne in the year 514. Until at least 517 he was involved in a power struggle with his step mother, Queen Kulaprabhavati, who was supported by his opponents.

He managed to strengthen his authority over the throne and he does so by being allies with the Emperor of China, Emperor Wu of Liang.

Rudravarman subsequently sent embassies in China in the years 517, 519, 520, 530, 535 and 539. He even proposed to give a hair of the Buddha to the Emperor of China, if the sovereign agreed to send the monk Che Yun Pao to Funan.

Rudravarman died in 540 and since he had no son, the Funan Dynasty declined and was invaded by the Chenla Dynasty under the rule of Bhavavarman I of Chenla.

== The Fall of Vyadhapura (616) ==
But the Funan still survived and it was ruled by de facto queens. In 616 the Funan capital of Vyadhapura was finally captured under the command of 16-year-old King Ishanavarman I of Chenla. The Funan Empire officially ended.

== Sources ==
- Bruno Dagens, Khmer, publishing company Les Belles Lettres, January 2003, 335 p. (ISBN 9782251410203), chap. I ("The Khmer Country, History"), p. 24–25
- (in) George Cœdès and Walter F. Vella ( eds. ) ( Trans. From French by Susan Brown Cowing) The Indianized States of Southeast Asia, University of Hawaii Press, May 1970, 424 p. (ISBN 9780824800710), p. 56–60
- Paul Pelliot, "The Funan," Bulletin of the French School of the Far East, vol. 3, n o 1, 1903, p. 270-271 (ISSN 1760-737X, doi:10.3406/befeo.1903.1216)

Preceded by Jayavarman Kaundinya	King of Funan; 514-550	Unknown
