= Jaya Simhavarman II =

- raja-di-raja

King of Champa
- Reign: 1041-1044
- Coronation: 1041
- Predecessor: Vikrantavarman IV
- Successor: Jaya Paramesvaravarman I
- Born: Unknown; Champa
- Died: 1044; Northern Champa
Names
- Yāṅ poṅ ku Śrī Simhavarmadeva
- Father: Vikrantavarman IV
- Mother: ?

Jaya Simhavarman II (Chinese: 刑卜施離值星霞弗; pinyin: Xíng Bǔ Shīlí Zhíxīngxiáfú (Note: The first character may be a scribal error for "Yang")), was a king of Champa, supposedly reigning from 1041 to 1044. He succeeded his father Shīlí Pílándéjiābámádié, perhaps Vikrantavarman IV (r. 1030–1041). In late 1042 he sent an envoy with tribute to the court of the Song dynasty.

Simhavarman II might have met with serious trouble during his short-lived reign. From the north, king Ly Thai Tong of Dai Viet accused Cham king's alleging raid in Dai Viet territory, henceforth he provoked war against Champa. In January 1044, the Dai Viet made a landfall in the coastal Huế-Da Nang region from the sea. The northern raiders plundered cities, ravaging the region, then battled against a counter Cham army led by the Cham king (he may be known as king Sạ Đẩu or Nhân Đẩu (仁斗) in the 14th-century Vietnamese chronicle Đại Việt sử lược). Unprepared, Simhavarman's army had been routed and himself was supposedly decapitated by the Dai Viet.

Then in July, Ly Thai Tong took his soldiers and entered the city of Phật Thệ (Indrapura/Đồng Dương). The raiders sacked the city, took away the royal harem including a Cham princess named Mi E and 5,000 women, artisans, laborers, to the north.

After much surprise and chaos, a new Cham ruler came to power, with regnal name Jaya Paramesvaravarman I–who was a warrior born from a noble family.

== Bibliography ==
- Coedès, George (1975), Vella, Walter F. (ed.), The Indianized States of Southeast Asia, University of Hawaii Press, ISBN 978-0-824-80368-1
- Lafont, Pierre-Bernard (2007), Le Campā: Géographie, population, histoire, Indes savantes, ISBN 978-2-84654-162-6

Preceded by Vikrantavarman IV 1030?–1041?	King of Champa; 1041?–1044?	Succeeded by Jaya Paramesvaravarman I 1044?–1060
