= Vikrantavarman III =

- raja-di-raja

Prince of Pāṇḍuraṅga
- Reign: 813-817

King of Champa
- Reign: 817-854?
- Coronation: 817
- Predecessor: Harivarman I
- Successor: Indravarman II
- Born: Unknown; Virapura, Champa
- Died: Unknown ?
Names
- Śrī Vikrāntavarmadeva
- Father: Harivarman I
- Mother: ?
- Religion: Saivite Balamon

Vikrāntavarman III was a king of Champa, reigning from 817 to around 854.

Vikrantavarman was a son of king Harivarman I (r. 802–817). In 813 he was appointed by his father position ruler (Adhipati) of Pāṇḍuraṅga Principality (Phan Rang), and became king of mandala Champa in 817. He performed rituals and presented gifts (rice fields) dedicating for the temple of Śiva, worshipped under the names of Vikrāntarudreśvara and Vikrāndevādhibhadreśvara in the Po Nagar temple, praising the king's ancestors. His inscriptions are typically very short. Nothing more is known about him.

An inscription dating from 829 AD in Bakul, Ninh Thuận mentions shrines built for worship Śiva and the Buddha, as they correspondingly forming the basis of local beliefs.

Suddenly, from 854 all southern inscriptions had vanished for unknown reasons. There was a 20-years break between year 854 and year 875. By 875, information again popped up in the Thu Bon River Valley under the new Buddhist ruler whose personal name Laksmindra Bhumiçvara Gramasvamin.

== Bibliography ==
- Coedès, George (1975), Vella, Walter F. (ed.), The Indianized States of Southeast Asia, University of Hawaii Press, ISBN 978-0-824-80368-1
- Lafont, Pierre-Bernard (2007), Le Campā: Géographie, population, histoire, Indes savantes, ISBN 978-2-84654-162-6

Preceded by Harivarman I 802–817	King of Champa; 817–?	Succeeded by Indravarman II ?–893
