= Yang Po Inu Nagar =

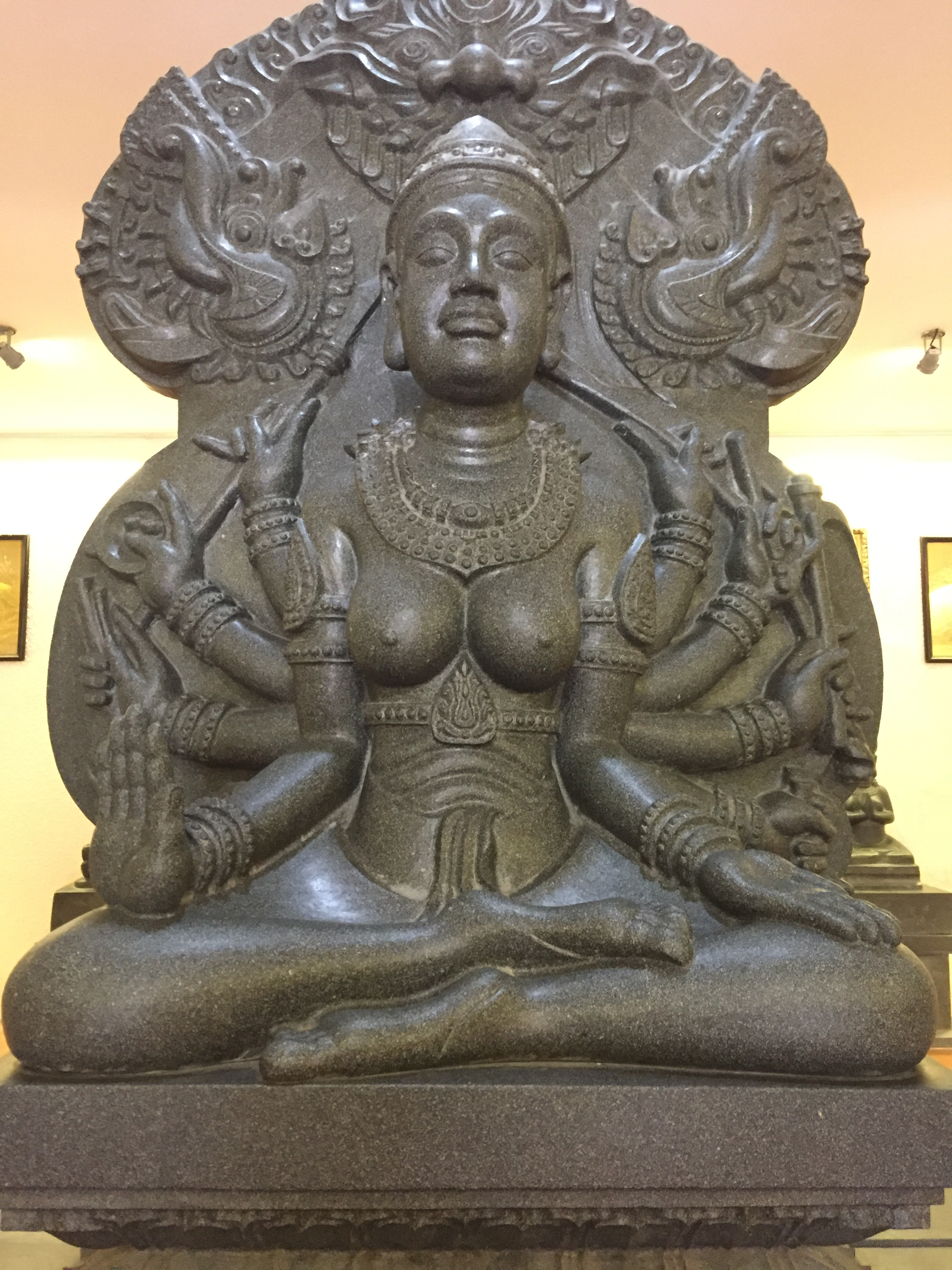
Statue of Yang Po Inu Nagar Taha in Nha Trang.

Yang Po Inu Nagar Taha or simply Po Inu Nagar (杨婆那加) was the founder of the Cham people according to legends.

== Title ==
Her full title in Cham language is Yāng-pô inâ Nāga-tāha. It includes the following elements: Heavenly (yang), king (po), of (inu), water/realm (nagar), big/extreme/high/great (taha). According to Maspero, it can means as "the lady of the realm" (bà chúa xứ in Vietnamese) or "great mother of the water" (mẫu thoải in Vietnamese).

== History ==
According to the myth of Pô Nagar, she was born from the clouds of the sky and the foam of the sea. Her physical form was manifest in a piece of eaglewood floating on the waves of the ocean. She is also said to have had ninety-seven husbands and thirty-nine daughters who became goddesses like their mother. Pô Nagar was the goddess who created the earth, eaglewood and rice. It is told that there was even the aroma of rice in the air around her. The Chams looked upon her as a goddess of plants and trees. She was considered nurturing like the earth and she granted blessings to her followers.

Cham tradition says that the founder of the Cham state was Yang Po Inu Nagar. She hailed from Khánh Hòa Province, in a peasant family in the mountains of Dai An. Spirits assisted her when she drifted on a piece of sandalwood to China, where she married a Chinese crown prince, the son of the Emperor of China, with whom she had two children. She then became Queen of Champa.

== See also ==
- Parvati
- Phosop
- Soma

Preceded by Position created	Legendary Queen of Champa	Succeeded by Houen Houei
