= Devavarman (Champa) =

Devavarma
- King of Champa
- Reign: 510–526?
- Predecessor: Pham Van Tan
- Successor: Vijayavarman
- Died: 526?
Names
- Devavarma
- House: 3rd Dynasty of Champa
- Father: Pham Van Tan
- Religion: Hindu

Devavarman (Chữ Nôm: 范天凯; Quốc ngữ: Phạm Thiên Khởi) was a king of the Lâm Ấp from 510 to about 526. In 510, Emperor Wu of Liang sent an Ambassador to Devavarman and forced the Cham people to pay an annual tribute.
