= Mahipativarman =

8th-century king of Chenla

- Mahipativarman

King of Lower Chenla (Water Chenla)
- Reign: c. AD 780
- Predecessor: Rajendravarman I
- Successor: Jayavarman II
- Born: Aninditapura
- Died: c. AD 780; Aninditapura
- Spouse: Rajendradevi
- Issue: Indradevi
- House: Baladityapura
- Dynasty: Varman
- Father: Rajendravarman I
- Mother: Nripatindradevi
- Religion: Hinduism

Mahipativarman (Khmer: ព្រះអង្គម្ចាស់ មហិបតិវរ្ម័ន) was the son of King Rajendravarman I. The last king of the Lower Chenla (also called Water Chenla) kingdom, he was beheaded by the king of Zabag.

Mahipativarman, the king of Water Chenla, expressed his desire before his courtiers, to see the chopped head of the king of Zabag which is identified with Java. This information was known to Dharanindra, the king of Java, so he conquered Water Chenla and beheaded Mahipativarman. And then, the king of Zabag installed a new king, Jayavarman II, on the throne as his vassal. Jayavarman first remained subordinate to Java for some time and thereafter declared independence.

Preceded by Rajendravarman I	King of Chenla c. AD 780	Succeeded by Jayavarman II
