= Suryavarman I =

King of the Khmer Empire

Suryavarman I សូរ្យវរ្ម័នទី១

Emperor of Kambuja
- Reign: 1002-1050
- Predecessor: Jayavarman V
- Successor: Udayadityavarman II
- Died: 1050
Posthumous name
- Nirvanapada
- Religion: Mahayana Buddhism

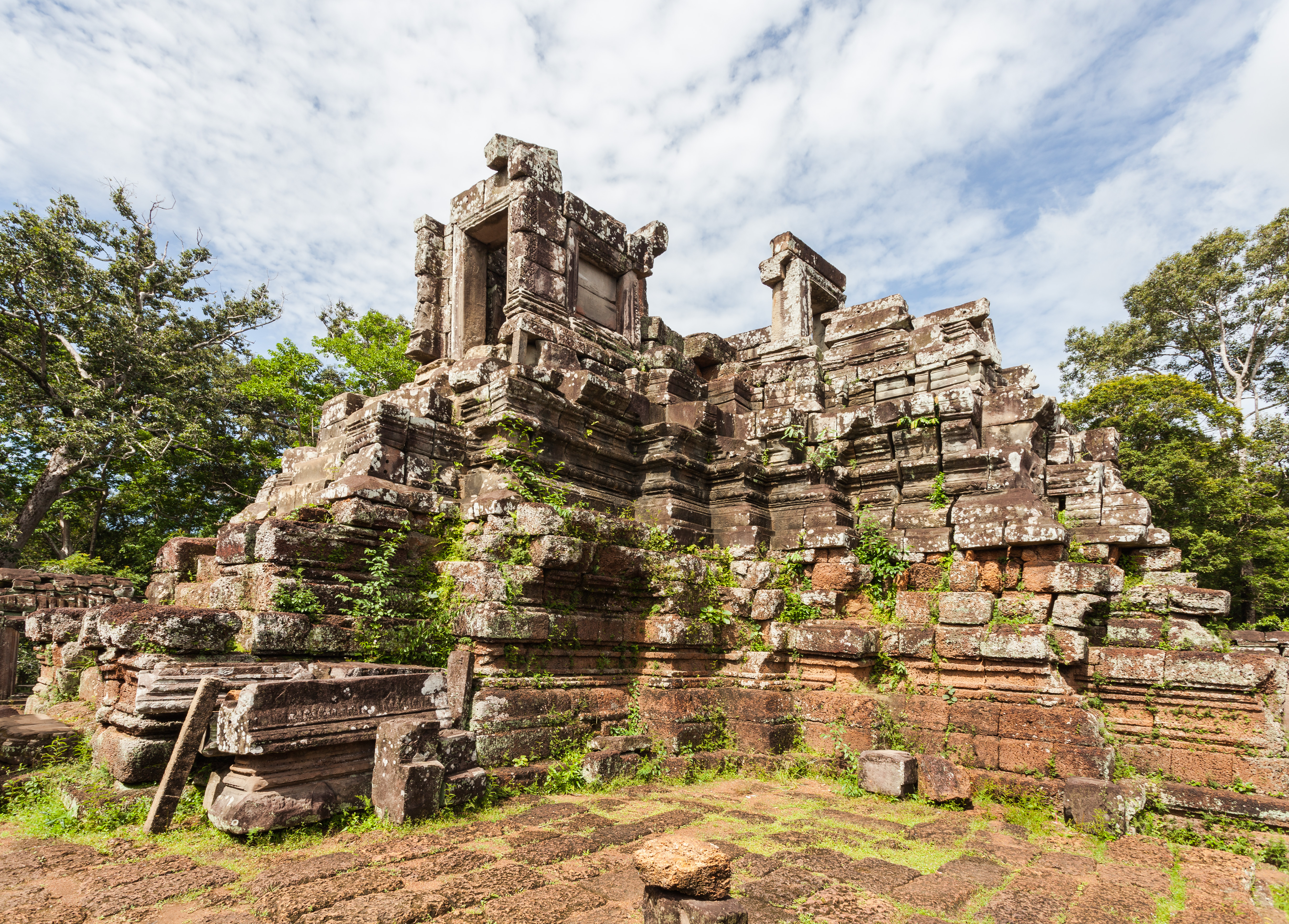
Ruins of Suryavarman I's capital at Phimeanakas

Suryavarman I (Khmer: សូរ្យវរ្ម័នទី១; posthumously Nirvanapada) was king of the Khmer Empire from 1002 to 1050. Suryavarman usurped King Udayadityavarman I, defeating his armies in approximately 1002. After a protracted war with Udayadityavarman's would-be successor, Jayavirahvarman, Suryavarman I claimed the throne in 1010. Suryavarman was a Mahayana Buddhist who was also tolerant of the growing Theravada Buddhist presence in the Khmer kingdom.

== Biography ==
Suryavarman I established diplomatic relations with the Chola dynasty of south India (Tamilnadu) around 1012. Suryavarman I sent a chariot as a present to the Chola Emperor Rajendra Chola I. It seems that the Khmer king Suryavarman I requested aid from the powerful Chola Emperor Rajendra Chola against the Tambralinga kingdom. After learning of Suryavarman's alliance with Rajendra Chola I, the Tambralinga kingdom requested aid from the Srivijaya king Sangrama Vijayatungavarman. That eventually led to the Chola Empire coming into conflict with the Srivijiya Empire. The war ended with a victory for the Chola dynasty and the Khmer Empire, major losses for the Sri Vijaya Empire and the Tambralinga kingdom.

His reign lasted some 40 years, and he spent much of that time defending it. Known as the "King of the Just Laws," he consolidated his political power by inviting some 4000 local officials to the royal palace and swear an oath of allegiance to him. Suryavarman favored Buddhism but allowed the people to continue practising Hinduism. His palace was situated in the vicinity of Angkor Thom, and he was the first Khmer ruler to protect his palace with a wall.

In the inscription at Tuol Ta Pec, Suryavarman is said to have known of the principles of the six Vedangas.

Suryavarman expanded his territory to the west to Lopburi, including the Menam basin in Thailand, and east into the Mekong basin.

Suryavarman probably started construction at Preah Khan Kompong Svay and expanded Banteay Srei, Wat Ek Phnom, and Phnom Chisor. The major constructions by the king were Preah Vihear, on Dangrek Mountain, and completion of the Phimeanakas and Ta Keo. Suryavarman also started the second Angkor reservoir, the West Baray, which is 8 km long and 2.1 km wide. It held more than 123 million liters of water. That is the largest Khmer reservoir to survive. There is some indication that Suryavarman sent a gift to Rajendra Chola I, the Chola Emperor.

During his reign, 47 cities (known as 47 pura) were under the control of Khmer Empire.

Suryavarman died in 1050 and was given the posthumous title Nirvanapada ("the king who has gone to nirvana"), a nod to his Buddhist beliefs. He was succeeded by his sons, Udayadityavarman II, who died around 1066, and Harshavarman III (Sadasivapada), who continued the struggle against internal rebellions and fought off assaults from the Chams until his death in 1080.

== In popular culture ==
The video game Age of Empires II HD: Rise of the Rajas contains a five-chapter campaign titled "Suryavarman I".

== See also ==
- Khleangs
- Buddhism in Cambodia

== Notes ==
Regnal titles
Preceded by Jayavarman V	Emperor of Angkor; 1006–1050	Succeeded by Udayadityavarman II
