= Indravarman II (Champa) =

- Raja-di-raja

King of Champa
- Reign: 854–893
- Coronation: 854
- Predecessor: Vikrantavarman III
- Successor: Jaya Simhavarman I
- Born: Unknown; Indrapura, Champa
- Died: 893; Indrapura, Champa
- Consort: Princess Rājakula-Haradevi
Names
- Laksmindra Bhumiçvara Gramasvamin
Regnal name
- Śrī Indravarmadeva
Posthumous name
- Paramabuddhaloka
- Dynasty: Bhrgu dynasty
- Father: Bhadravarman
- Mother: Mahâdevï
- Religion: Mahayana Buddhism

Indravarman II (Sanskrit: जय इंद्रवर्मन; ? - 893) was the king of Champa from 854 to 893 and the founder of Champa's Sixth dynasty.

== Reign ==
During his reign, relations between Champa and China was restored. Chinese historians begin referring Champa by Chang-cheng or the city of Cham in its Sanskrit form. He founded a new capital, Indrapura in modern-day Quang Nam Province.

Indravarman claimed himself to be a master that had been enlightened after many years of meditating, not a member of any noble house or previous dynasties.

He authorized the construction of Lakshmindralokeçvara temple, a Mahayana Buddhist monastery located in Dong Duong (Indrapura), southeast of Mỹ Sơn. A royal cult consecrating to Avalokiteśvara was highly promoted by the Cham elites. In 889, Khmer ruler Yasovarman I led an invasion of Champa, but was repelled by Indravarman II.

== Bibliography ==
- Hall, Daniel George Edward (1981), History of South East Asia, Macmillan Education, Limited, ISBN 978-1-349-16521-6
- Maspero, Georges (2002), The Champa Kingdom, White Lotus Co., Ltd, ISBN 978-9-74753-499-3

Preceded by Vikrantavarman III 817–?	King of Champa ?–893	Succeeded by Jaya Simhavarman I 897–904
