= Indrani of Sambhupura =

Indrani

Queen of Sambhupura
- Reign: c. 1st-quarter of the 8th-century
- Successor: Nṛpatendradevī

Queen consort of Lower Chenla (Water Chenla)
- Tenure: c. 8th-century
- Spouse: Pushkaraksha
- Issue: Shambhuvarman; Nṛpatendradevī

Indrani (8th-century), was a queen regnant of Sambhupura in Chenla in Cambodian history. She was also the queen of Pushkaraksha, the king of Lower Chenla.

Sambhupura, the chief principality in the middle Mekong portion of Cambodia at this time, had its own dynasty in its 8th-century. Indrani was the heiress of the Sambhupura polity in Cambodia. She married Pushkaraksha (also known as Indraloka), who was possibly the successor and son of queen Jayadevi.

Pushkaraksha, the ruler of Lower Chenla, is said to have married the reigning queen of Sambhupura. Pushkaraksha, Indrani's spouse, became King consort of Sambhupura when they married, but it is clear that she was a queen regnant and monarch by her own right.

She had a son, prince Shambhuvarman (Rudravarman), and a daughter, princess Nṛpatendradevī. Her son married princess Narendradevi (II) of Chenla, the daughter of his father's sister Narendradevi I, and her daughter Nṛpatendradevī succeeded her on the throne and married her brothers' son.

Queen Indrani was acknowledged and honored as a ruler and monarch in her own right for centuries after her death. An inscription dated 860, commissioned during the reign of Jayavarman III, mentions ‘the land of vrah kamraten an Indrani’. Her great-grandchild king Indravarman I (r. 877–889) erected a statue of ‘the queen of Indraloka, Indrani’, at the Bakong monument before 881.
