= Satyavarman =

- raja-di-raja

King of Champa
- Reign: 770–787
- Coronation: 770
- Predecessor: Prithindravarman
- Successor: Indravarman I
- Born: Kauthara, Champa
- Died: 787; Kauthara
Names
- Śrī Satyavarman
Posthumous name
- Isvaraloka
- House: Fifth dynasty
- Religion: Hinduism, Buddhism

Jaya Satyavarman (died 787 AD), was the second king of the Fifth dynasty of Champa, modern-day Central Vietnam, reigned from 770 to 787. He was the nephew (sister's son) of king Prithindravarman, founder of a dynasty that centralized around the southern part of Champa.

In 774 and 787, Javanese raiders assaulted Champa, plundered the Po Nagar temple, vandalized and looted the temple's treasures and burned the statue of Siva. Inscription C. 216 describes the "darkness" of invaders' skin complexion. Satyavarman quickly repulsed the invaders and rebuilt the temple.

An stele erected on 16 May 783, commemorating his reconstruction of the linga for Śiva in Phước Thiện, Ninh Thuận Province (French: Cette installation du linga du Dieu Primordial, exécutée par lui Satyavarman...), previously was looted by the Javanese.

Satyavarman died in 787 and was succeeded by his brother Indravarman I, who had his own domain in Ninh Thuận.

== Bibliography ==
- Golzio, Karl-Heinz (2004), Inscriptions of Campā based on the editions and translations of Abel Bergaigne, Étienne Aymonier, Louis Finot, Édouard Huber and other French scholars and of the work of R. C. Majumdar. Newly presented, with minor corrections of texts and translations, together with calculations of given dates, Shaker Verlag

Preceded by Prithindravarman 758–770	King of Champa; 770–787	Succeeded by Indravarman I 787–801
