= Indrajayavarman =

- King of the Khmer Empire
- Reign: 1308 – 1327
- Predecessor: Indravarman III
- Successor: Jayavarman Paramesvara
- Religion: Hinduism (Shaivism)

Indrajayavarman or Indravarman IV (Khmer: ឥន្រ្ទវរ្ម័នទី៤) and also known as Srindrajayavarman (Khmer: ស្រីន្រ្ទជ័យវរ្ម័ន) was the ruler of Khmer Empire from 1308-1327, and was succeeded by Jayavarmadiparamesvara. Charles Higham states this is the last Sanskrit record of Angkor.

== History ==
Information about Indrajayavarman was obtained from four inscriptions and the meager statements in Chinese dynastic history:

The inscription of Vat Kok Khpos, dated 1309, says the reign of Indravarman came to an end in 1308. This inscription speaks of the capital under the name of Yasodharapura. A re-reading, by Coedes, of the inscription of the Bayon, dated after 1327, revealed that the reign of Indrajayavarman lasted until 1327. Yuan-Shih, quoted by Pelliot, says a Chinese mission came to Cambodia to buy elephants in 1320.
