= Nṛpatendradevī =

Queen of Sambhupura
- Reign: c. 8th-century
- Predecessor: Indrani
- Successor: Jayendrabhā

Queen consort of Lower Chenla (Water Chenla)
- Tenure: c. 8th-century
- Spouse: Rajendravarman I
- Issue: Mahipativarman; Jayendrabhā
- Father: Pushkaraksha
- Mother: Indrani

Nrpendradevi or Nṛpatendradevī (8th-century), was a queen regnant of Sambhupura in Chenla in Cambodian history. She was also the queen of Rajendravarman I, the king of Lower Chenla.

She was the daughter of Queen Indrani of Sambhupura and King Pushkaraksha (also known as Indraloka). She inherited the throne from her mother instead of her brother, prince Shambhuvarman (Rudravarman), who instead married their cousin, princess Narendradevi of Chenla.

Queen Nrpendradevi married her cousin and nephew, her brother's son prince Rajendravarman I of Chenla, and became the mother of queen Jayendrabhā, who succeeded her on the throne. Also, Mahipativarman was the son of Rajendravarman I and her. Rajendravarman I, the ruler of Lower Chenla, became King consort of Sambhupura by marrying her.
