= Jayavirahvarman =

Jayaviravarman is a king who reigned over the Khmer Empire from 1002 to 1011 AD.

The origin of this prince is uncertain: According to Achilles Dauphin-Meunier, he was the rightful successor and brother of Udayadityavarman I, who lives climbing the pretensions of a usurper, Suryavarman I, but managed to stay in Yaçodhapura. George Coedès, who considers him a usurper, believes that Jayaviravarman was the prince of the city of Tambralinga (Nakhon Si Thammarat in Thailand), and that he takes power and reigns in Angkor. MJ Boisselier awards him Ta Keo. In any case, Jayaviravarman disappears after a nine-year civil war.

== Sources ==
- George Cœdès, Les États hindouisés d'Indochine et d'Indonésie, Paris, 1964.
- Achille Dauphin-Meunier, Histoire du Cambodge, Que sais-je ? nº 916, P.U.F, 1968.

Regnal titles
Preceded by Udayadityavarman I	Emperor of Angkor; 1002–1006	Succeeded by Suryavarman I
