= Po Nagar =

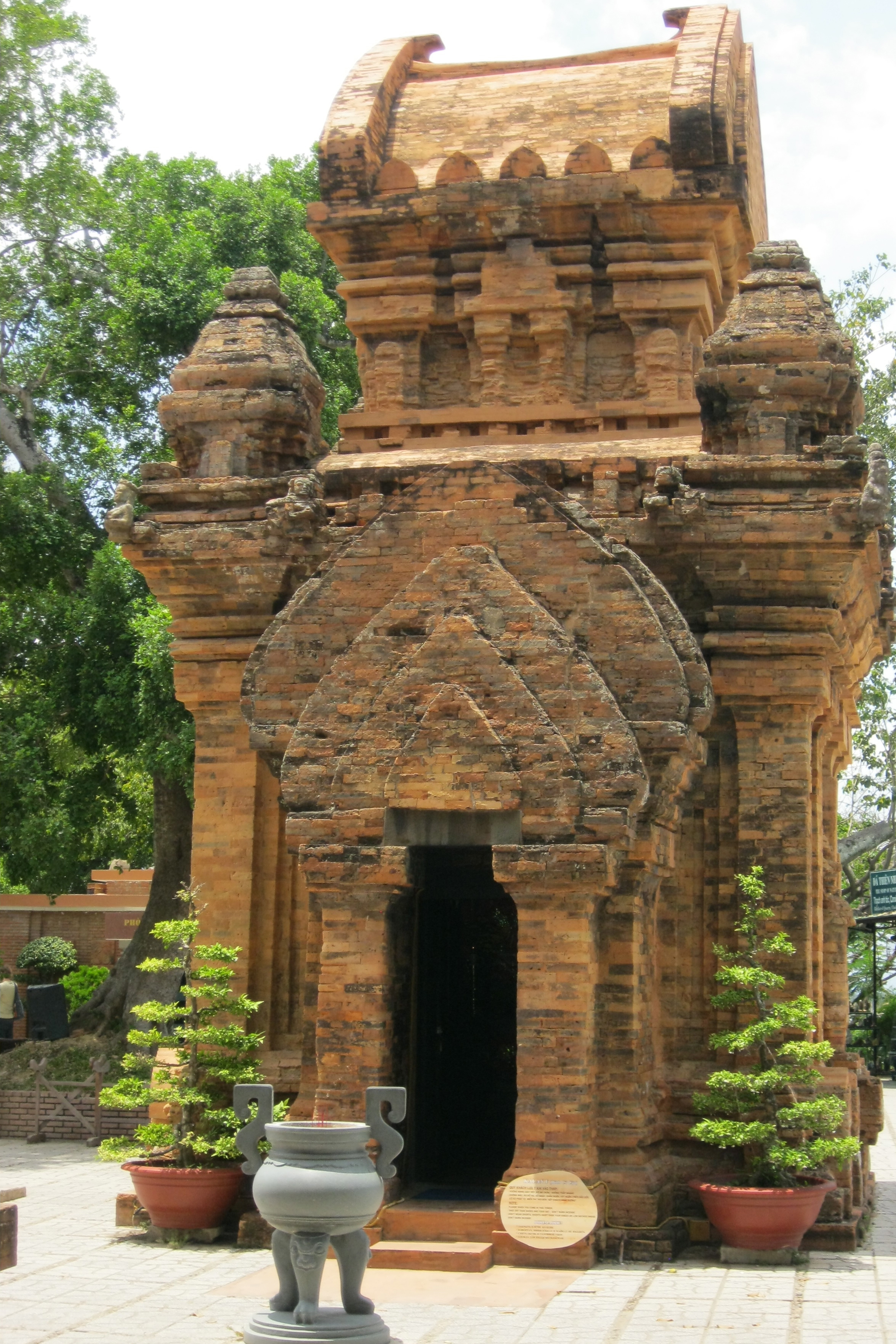
- Ganesh Temple in Po Nagar

- Location in Vietnam

Religion
- Affiliation: Hinduism
- Province: Khanh Hoa
- Deity: Yan Po Nagar

Location
- Location: Nha Trang
- Country: Vietnam
- Interactive map of Po Nagar
- Coordinates: 12°15′55″N 109°11′44″E

Architecture
- Type: Champa
- Completed: mid-10th to 13th century

Po Nagar is a Cham temple tower founded sometime before 781 and located in the medieval principality of Kauthara, near modern Nha Trang in Vietnam. It is dedicated to Yan Po Nagar, the goddess of the country, who came to be identified with the Hindu goddesses Bhagavati and Hariti, and who in Vietnamese is called Thiên Y Thánh Mẫu.

== History ==
A stele dated 781 indicates that the Cham King Satyavarman regained power in the area of "Ha-Ra Bridge", and that he restored the devastated temple. From this inscription can be deduced that the area previously had come under temporary foreign dominion, and that foreign vandals had damaged the already existing temple. Other steles indicate that the temple had contained a mukhalinga decorated with jewelry and resembling an angel's head. Foreign robbers, perhaps from Java, "men living on food more horrible than cadavers, frightful, completely black and gaunt, dreadful and evil as death" had arrived in ships, had stolen the jewelry and had broken the linga. Though the king had chased the robbers out to sea, the treasure had been lost forever. The steles also indicate that the king restored the linga in 784.

The Cham military leader Senapati Par, under the reign of Harivarman I, made endowments in 817. Senapati made attacks on the Khmers under Jayavarman II. Harivarman I was succeeded by his son, Vikrantavarman III, who also made endowments.

A stele dated 918 by the Cham King Indravarman III states an order to build a golden statue to the goddess Bhagavati. Later steles report that the original gold statue was stolen by the Khmer's Rajendravarman II in 950, and that in 965, the king Jaya Indravarman I replaced the lost statue with a new stone one. A stele dated 1050 says that offerings of land, slaves, jewelry, and precious metals were made to the statue by Jaya Paramesvaravarman I. Paramabhodisattva made "rich offerings" in 1084 after reuniting the country. Jaya Indravarman III gave the temple a Shivalinga and a Shrishana Vishnu in 1141 and another donation in 1143. In 1160, Jaya Harivarman I "offered rich gifts". An inscription states Jayavarman VII of the Khmer Empire, "took the capital of Champa and carried of all the lingas." Later steles indicate the celebration of a cult in honor of the goddess Yan Po Nagar, as well as the presence of statues dedicated to the principal deities of Buddhism.

In the 17th century, the Vietnamese occupied Champa and took over the temple, calling it Thiên Y Thánh Mẫu Tower. A number of Vietnamese legends regarding the goddess and the tower have come into being.

== Site ==
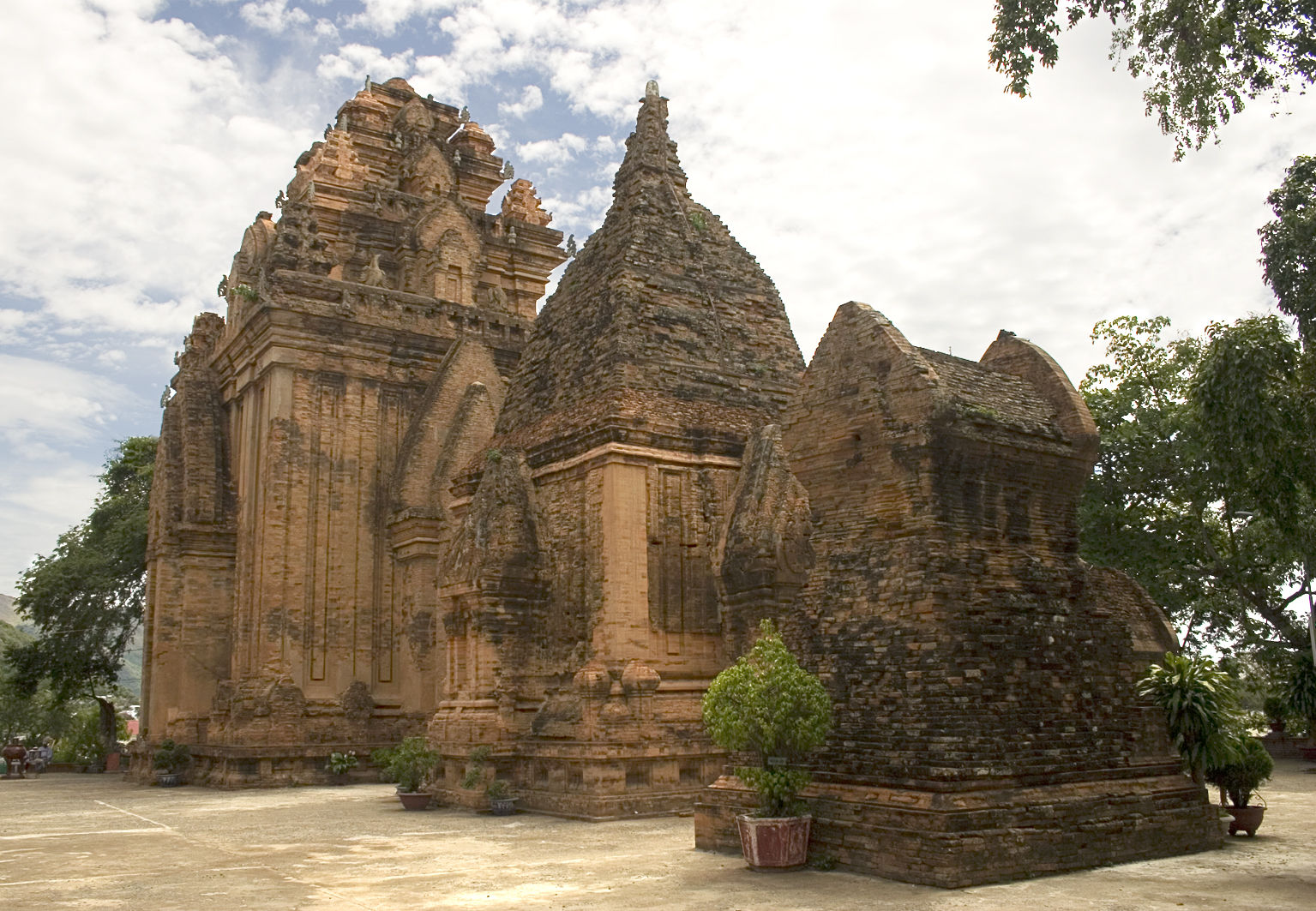
The towers of Po Nagar are located on a hill.

The Po Nagar complex is situated on Cù Lao Mountain. It consists of three levels, the highest of which encompasses two rows of towers. The main tower is about 25 m high.

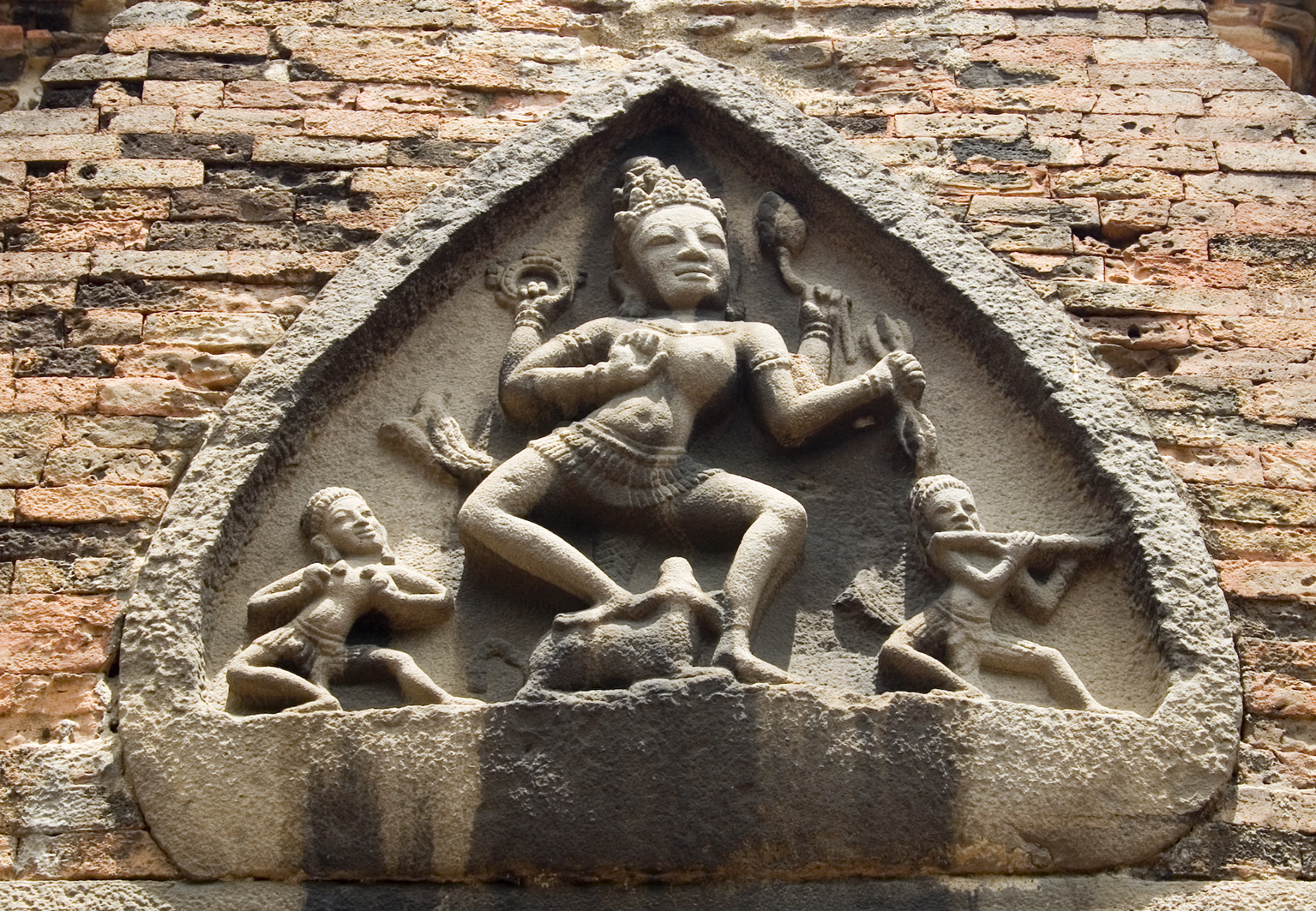
Durga, the slayer of the buffalo-demon, is represented on the pediment above the entrance to the temple.

The temple's central image is a 1.2m tall stone statue of the goddess Yan Po Nagar sitting cross-legged, dressed only in a skirt, with ten hands holding various symbolic items. According to Vietnamese scholar Ngô Vǎn Doanh, these attributes show that Yan Po Nagar was identified also with the Hindu goddess Mahishasuramardini or Durga, the slayer of the buffalo-demon. Another sculpture of the goddess Mahishasuramardini may be found in the pediment above the entrance to the temple: it depicts the four-armed goddess holding a hatchet, a lotus and a club, and standing on a buffalo. This sculpture belongs to the Tra Kieu style of Cham art from the end of the 10th century or the beginning of the 11th century.

== See also ==
- Art of Champa
- Phosop
