= Jayavarman V =

Jayavarman V ជ័យវរ្ម័នទី៥ V
- King
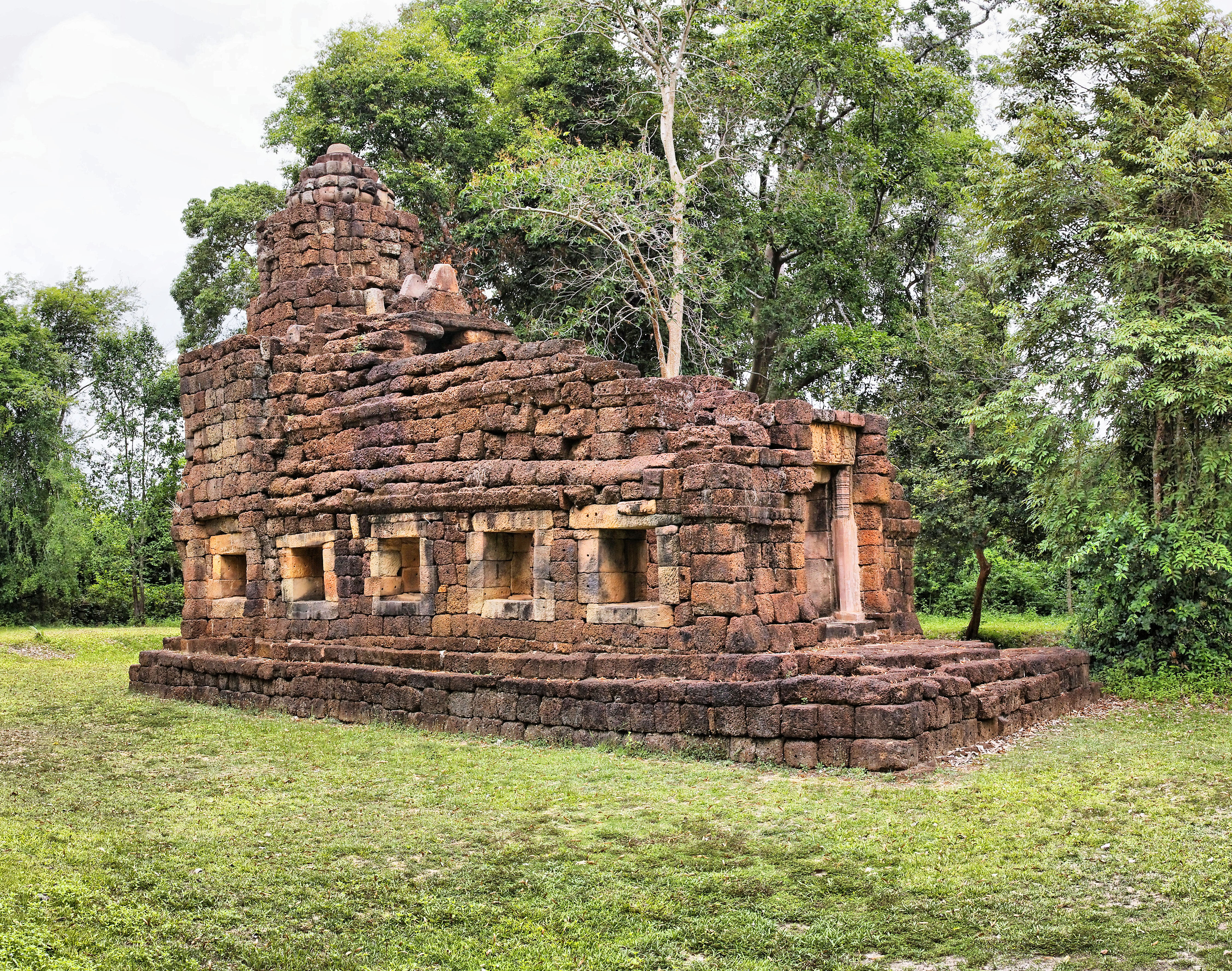
- Reign: 968–1001
- Predecessor: Rajendravarman
- Successor: Suryavarman I
- Born: c. 958
- Died: 1001 (aged 42–43)
Posthumous name
- Paramaviraloka
- Religion: Shaivist Hinduism

Jayavarman V (Khmer: ជ័យវរ្ម័នទី៥) was a ruler of the Khmer Empire from his state temple, Jayendranagari, at Jayendrapura. During his reign, the Khmer Empire had 20 cities or pura.

== Early years ==
Jayavarman V succeeded his father, Rajendravarman, when he was only ten years old. During his early years, the court officials dominated the royal politics. He studied under a very knowledgeable teacher Yajnavaraha, a grandson of King Harshavarman I. Yajnavaraha was a distinguished scholar as he was "first in the knowledge of the doctrines of the Buddha, medicine and astronomy," and in 967 Yajnavaraha constructed Banteay Srei, considered the jewel of Khmer art for its very beautiful display of bas-reliefs. When Jayavarman turned seventeen years old, he began the construction of his own state shrine, Ta Keo. However, an unfortunate event occurred as the edifice was hit by a thunder bolt during its construction. This was taken as an evil omen and the priests of the court performed a ritual to dispel the demons; afterward, stones and elephants were brought in to finish the job, but without success. The construction was left unfinished.

== Ruling elites ==
The aristocratic families dominated Jayavarman V's court. Briggs write, "There is probably no reign in the history of ancient Khmers in which more distinguished ministers, scholars, and dignitaries are mentioned in the inscriptions." Atmashiva, who served under the two previous kings, was his purohita, chaplain. And Narayana, who had also served under King Rajendravarman, was his hotar, high priest. However, the most influential and powerful ruling family of all was the house of Saptadevakula who dominated most of the royal affairs. This clan also helped King Suryavarman I come to power in 1002.

== Rise of Mahayana Buddhism and women power ==
Even though Jayavarman V was a Shaivite, he was very tolerant of Buddhism. And under his reign Buddhism flourished. Kirtipandita, his Buddhist minister, brought ancient texts from foreign lands to Cambodia, though none survived. He even suggested that priests used Buddhist prayers as well as Hindu during a ritual.

Buddha teaches tolerance toward all beings, and the rise of Buddhism during Jayavarman V's reign also ushered women in many high positions. Jahavi, younger sister of Yajnavaraha the guru, helped raise money for the construction of Banteay Srei as this temple was not funded by the king. Prana of the Saptadevakula family was the king's trusted advisor. "Chinese writers praise the women of Cambodia for their knowledge of astrology and government and say the women of the royal family sometimes held high political posts, including that of judge."

His sister, Indralakshmi, married the Indian Brahman Divakarabhatta.

== Jayavarman's achievements ==
During Jayavarman's reign he built the Takeo temple in Angkor. He was a decent-ruling king in the Khmer Empire. Though Jayavarman isn't a warrior-king like his great ancestors Rajendravarman, Yasovarman, or Jayavarman II, he maintained peace and stability to the empire, keeping peace for over 30 years.

== The Power Vacuum ==
But Jayavarman died without a heir to his throne. Onward from 1001 to 1011 A.D, the nobles and officials of Jayavarman's court fought for the throne. One noble dominated the power and installed Jayavarman's nephew Udayadityavarman I as the puppet king. But another noble seized power shortly after, killed the puppet king in 1002 and made himself king, taking the throne name of Jayavirahvarman (1002 A.D to 1011 A.D). But in the 9th reign of Jayavirahvarman, another of Jayavarman's nephew, Suryavarman I had so much support that he took control. Suryavarman I marched on to Angkor and besieged Jayavirahvarman. Jayavirahvarman surrenders and Suryavarman exiled him. Suryavarman was made king of Angkor, the Varman Dynasty survives, and he would bring up the first Khmer golden age in its history.

== Posthumous name ==
Jayavarman V's reign lasted for about 30 years and his kingdom was peaceful and prosperous. He died in 1001 and received the posthumous name of Paramaviraloka.

== Notes ==
Preceded by Rajendravarman I	Emperor of Angkor; 968–1001	Succeeded by Udayadityavarman I
