= Udayadityavarman I =

King of Angkor from 1001-1002 CE

Udayadityavarman I was the king of Angkor who reigned from 1001 to 1002 AD.

Maternal nephew of his predecessor Jayavarman V (968 – 1001), he reigned only for a few months. His death triggered a nine-year civil war. His successor in Yaśodharapura is a prince of the royal family named Jayavirahvarman (1002 – 1010).

== Sources ==
- George Cades, The Hindu States of Indochina and Indonesia, Paris, 1964.

Regnal titles
Preceded by Jayavarman V	Emperor of Angkor; 1002	Succeeded by Jayavirahvarman
