= Tosatto =

Tosatto is a surname. Notable people with the surname include:

- Guy Tosatto (born 1958), French art historian, museum curator and museum director
- Matteo Tosatto (born 1974), Italian cyclist

== See also ==
- Tosatti
