= Interior with Aubergines =

Painting by Henri Matisse

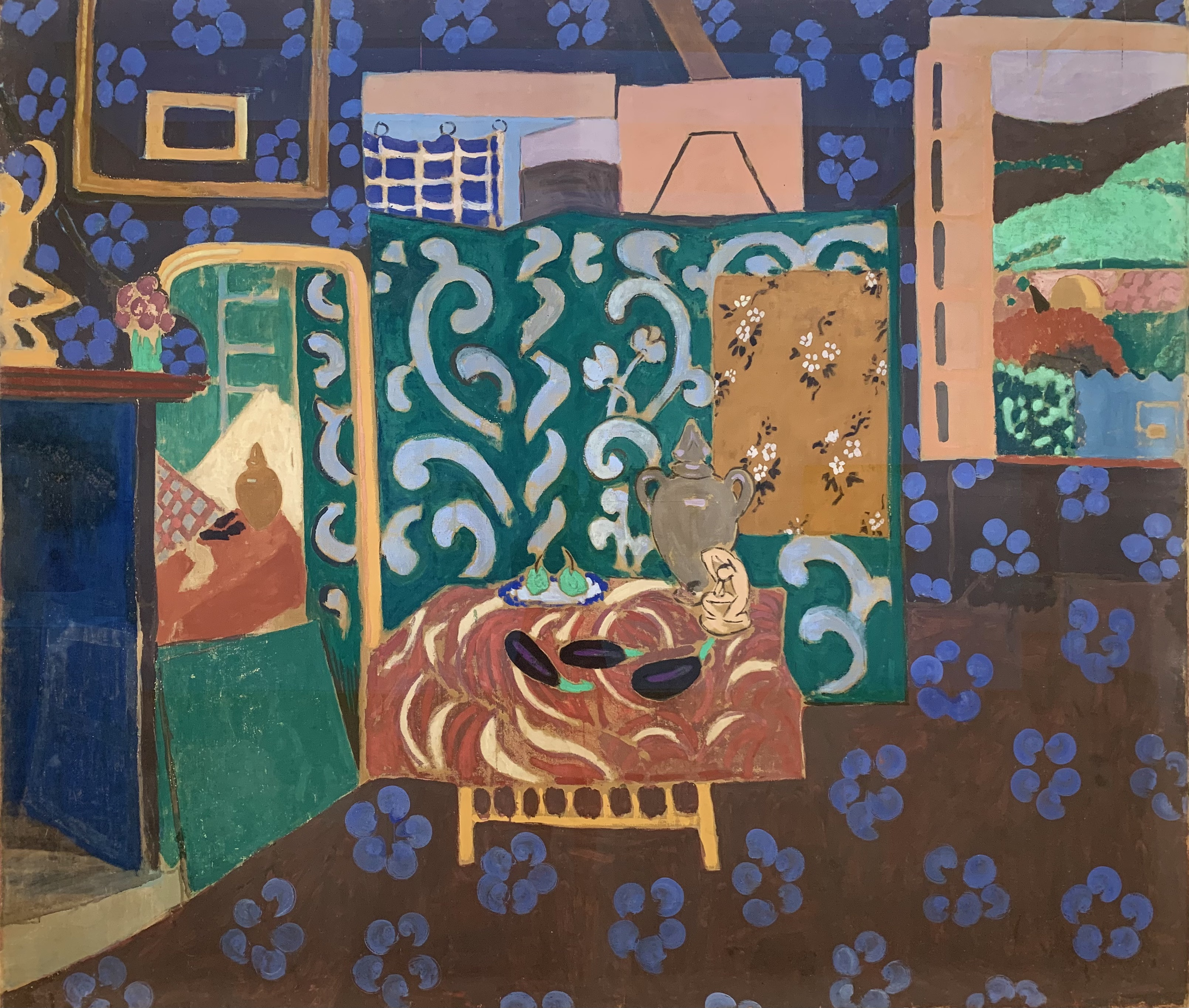

Interior with Aubergines (French - Intérieur aux aubergines) is a 1911 oil on canvas painting by Henri Matisse, produced in his studio in Collioure. It is part of his set of four Symphonic Interiors (the others being The Pink Studio in the Pushkin Museum, The Painter's Family in the Hermitage Museum and The Red Studio in the Museum of Modern Art).

== See also ==
- List of works by Henri Matisse

== External links (in French) ==
- Henri Matisse. Intérieur aux aubergines, 1911, sur le site connaissancedesarts.com
- Intérieur aux aubergines, sur le site cineclubdecaen.com
- Intérieur aux aubergines, sur le site ac-grenoble.fr
- analyse de oeuvre

== Bibliography (in French) ==
- Dominique Fourcade, Rêver à trois aubergines, Paris, Minuit, revue "Critique", n° 324, May 1974. Réédition (livre), Paris, Editions du Centre Pompidou, 2012; 2° édition, 2020.
- Ouvrage collectif, Serge Lemoine (ed.) L'art du XXe siècle, la collection du musée de Grenoble, Avignon, 1994 ISBN 2711829499
- Martine Viet, Agir en artiste avec Matisse, Laon, CDDP de l'Aisne, 2000, collection "Agir en artiste", p. 107
- Guy Tosatto (ed.), Matisse au musée de Grenoble (21 juin-21 septembre 2003)
- Ouvrage collectif, G. Tosatto (ed.) Les Collections du musée de Grenoble, s. l.,2004 ISBN 2854952197 pp. 107-111
- Cécile Debray, Henri Matisse (1869-1954), Monographies du centre Pompidou, 2011 ISBN 9782844265418
- Fondation P. Gianadda Martigny Suisse, Matisse en son temps, exhibition at the centre Pompidou (20 June to 22 November 2015)
