= Wat Athvea =

Buddhist temple in Cambodia

- ប្រាសាទវត្តអធ្វារ
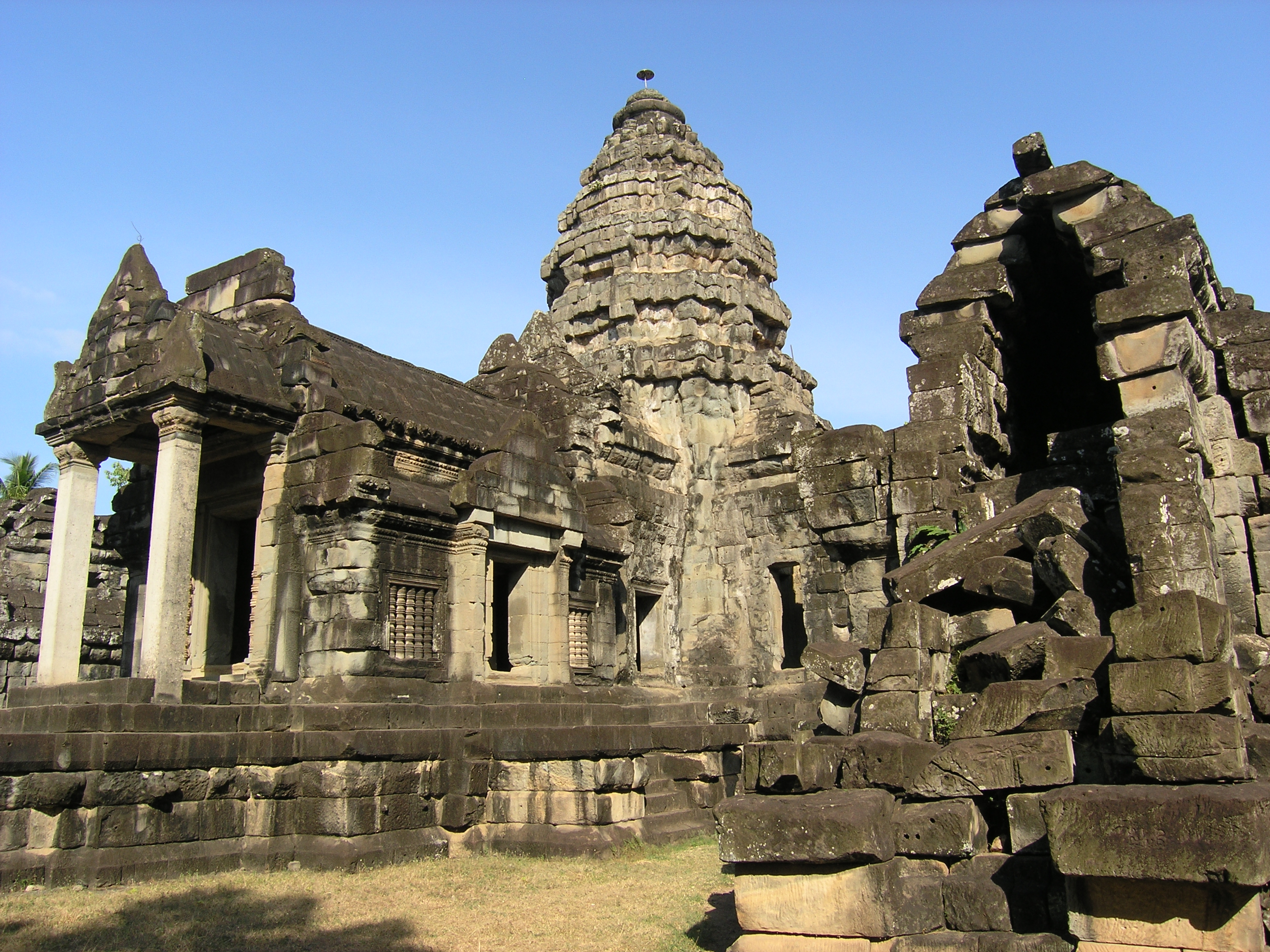
- Main tower of Wat Athvea

- Location in Cambodia

Religion
- Affiliation: Buddhism
- Region: Southeast Asia

Location
- Coordinates: 13°19′25″N 103°50′28″E

Wat Althea, also called Prasat Vat Althea, is a 12th-century Buddhist temple at Angkor, Cambodia with Theravada temple and cemetery adjacent to the walled ancient structure.

== Location ==
It is 6 km south of Siem Reap, just west of the road leading to the Tonle Sap, on the right bank of the Siem Reap River.

Wat Athvea to the south and Wat Preah Enkosey to the north correspond to the limits of the ancient and principal north–south axis of Siemreap, whereas the city has extended east and west along the National Highway 6.

== Etymology ==
Prasat Wat Athvea has the double name of Wat and Prasat because next to the old Vishnuite temple is built a modern Buddhist pagoda.

Athvea is a significant name of Angkorian temples, and it means the way, route or pass.

== History ==
The temple's design and the distinctive style of its devata (sacred female images) indicate that it was built during the reign of King Suryavarman II (circa 1115-1150 AD), who also built Angkor Wat. In fact, The themes of Wat Athvea, similar to of Angkor Wat and Thommanon are predominantly Vaishnava, although Shaivite scenes also are represented—which illustrates the liberal Khmer attitudes about religious beliefs.

The change of orientation from East to West has brought some, as David Snellgrove, to think that Wat Athvea was probably built as a Buddhist temple in the early 13th century, at a date indicated by the foundation stele, at a time when Buddhism and Vedic religions overlapped in Cambodia.

The first archeologists, like Jean Garnier, who wanted to explore Angkor Wat would sail up the Mekong and the Tonle Sap and make a first step at the landmark hill of Phnom Krom and then stop at Wat Athvea as they rowed their boats up the Siem Reap River if the water was sufficient, or they rode on the back of elephants to Siemreap.

To this day, the pagoda built next to the prasat maintains rites which date to pre-Buddhist times, as neak ta ceremonies inside the main hall of Prasat Wat Athvea. Anthropologist Ang Choulean demonstrated direct descent from Angkorian tradition is evident in the cut-out paper appliqué placed on an altar during the Wat Athvea funerary celebration.

== Architecture ==
Archeologists such as Henri Marchal, consider that the architecture of Wat Athvea and Angkor Wat are "extremely similar": "same firmness in profiles, same purity of lines and same classic aspect in the general outline".

While Etienne Lunet de Lajonquière mistakenly believed it was oriented eastwards like other temples, Wat Athvea actually faces west like Angkor Wat, which is a remarkable exception, noted for the first time by French captain Ernest Doudart de Lagrée, who suggested that it might have been the sign of the arrival of a new cult from the West.

Library-like buildings are located at the rear of the central shrine.

Wat Athvea has five Khmer inscriptions, all of a later date:

- Inscription 261 A (site: Vat Athvea, area: Siem Reap, Saka year: 1561)
- Inscription 261 B (site: Vat Athvea, area: Siem Reap, Saka year: 1561)
- Inscription 261 C (site: Vat Athvea, area: Siem Reap, Saka year: 1561)
- Inscription 261 D (site: Vat Athvea, area: Siem Reap, Saka year: 1561)
- Inscription 261 E (site: Vat Athvea, area: Siem Reap, Saka year: 1561)

The nearby pagoda is similar in style to that of Wat Damnak, especially with its wooden carved shutters with scenes of the Reamker.

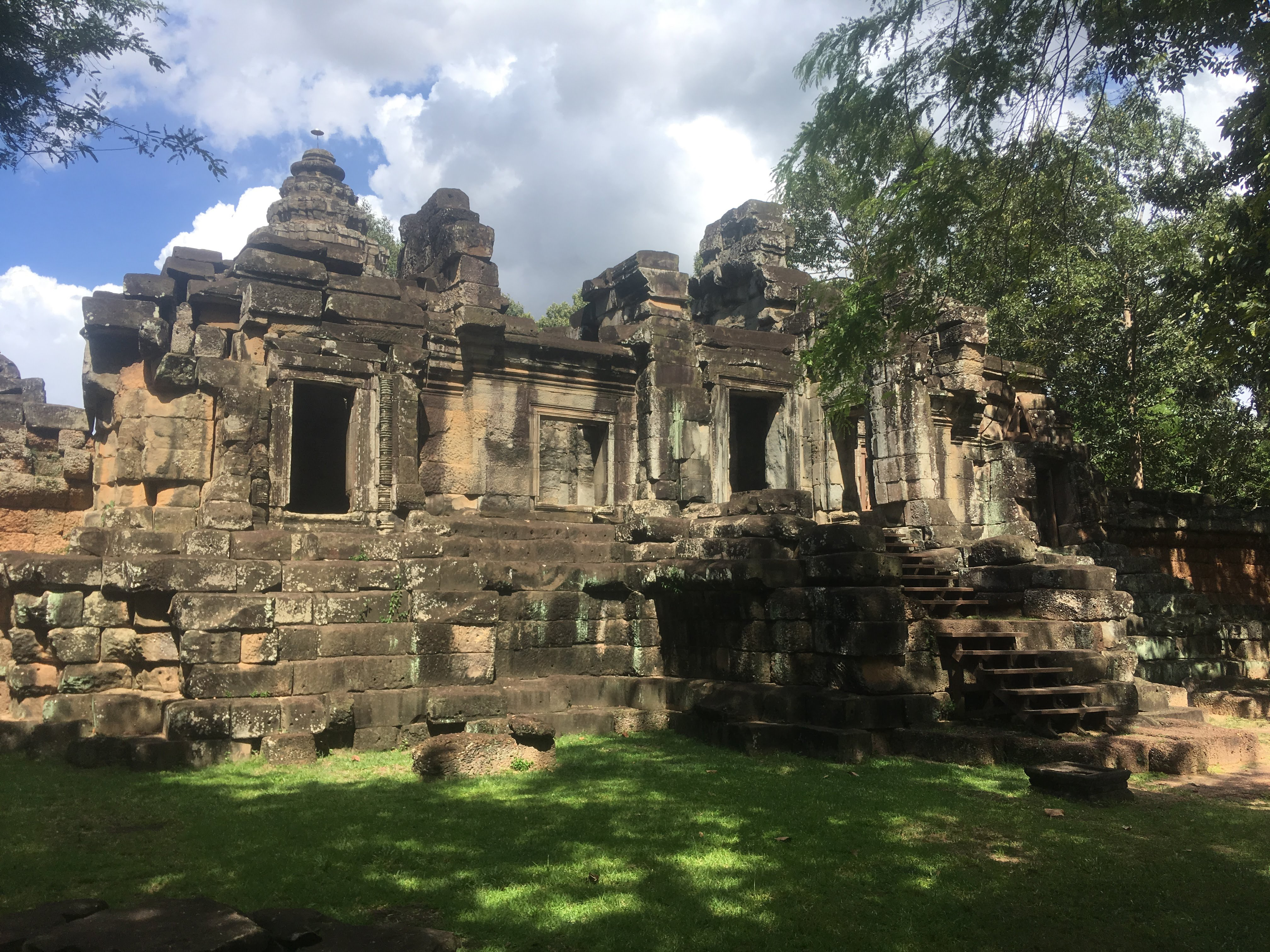

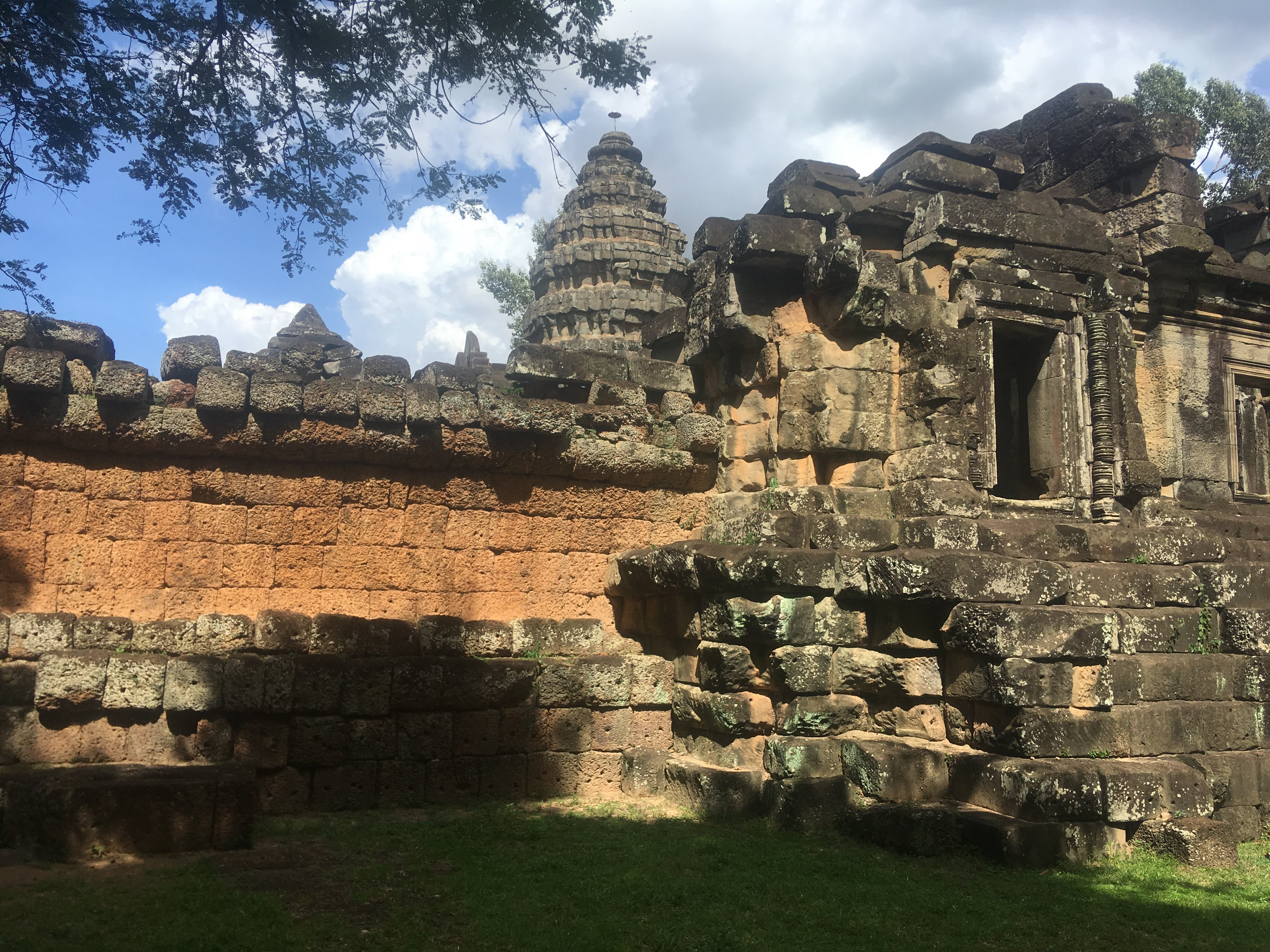

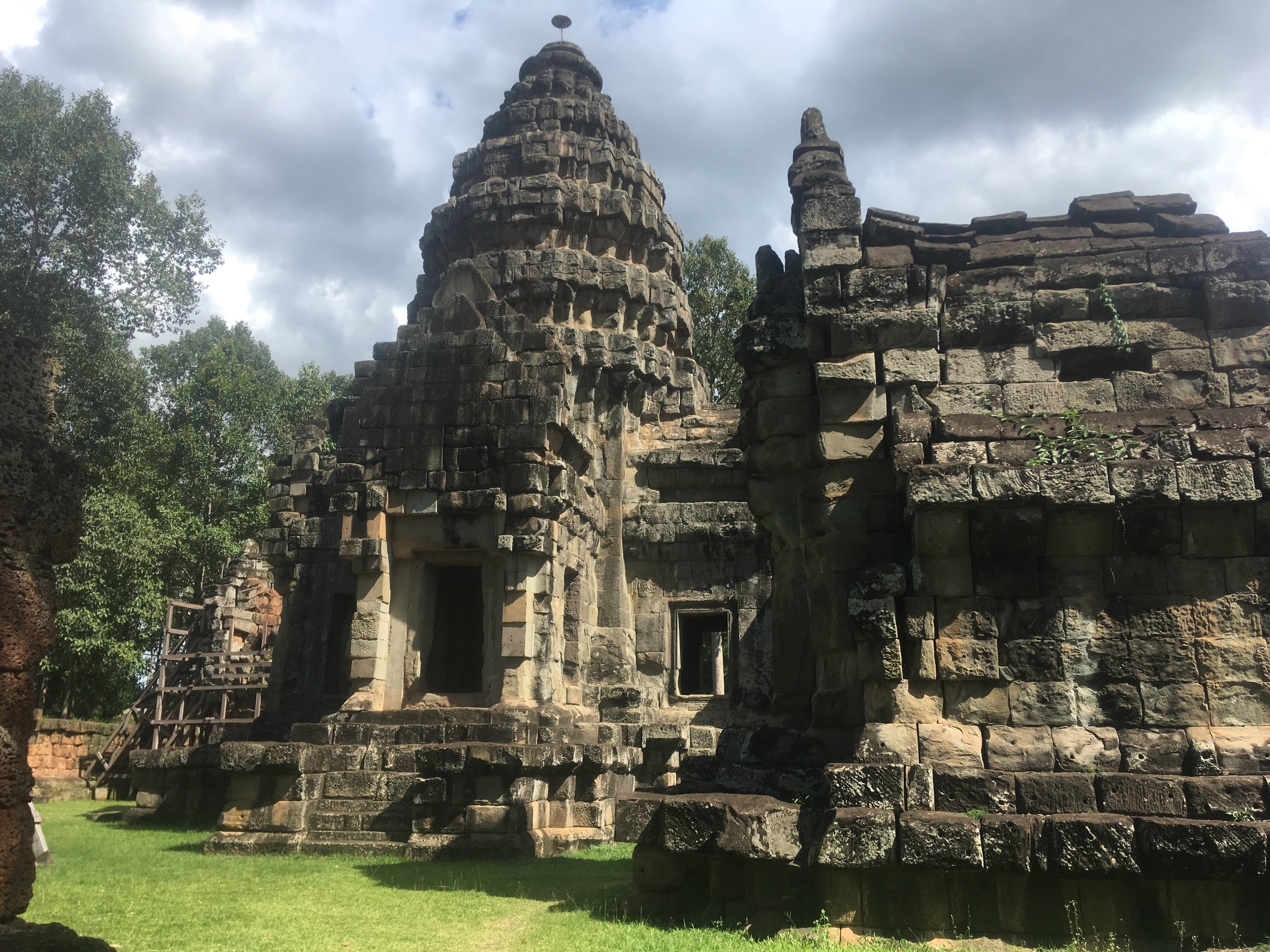

== See also ==
- Angkor Wat
- Beng Mealea
- Devata
- Thommanon

== Bibliography ==
- S. Pou, VI. Inscriptions en Khmer Moyen de Vat Athvea (K. 261). Bulletin de l’École française d’Extrême-Orient 64, 151–166 (1977).
- Greater Angkor Project, “Greater Angkor Project 2011–2015 Preliminary Report Series: Wat Athvea West June 2013,” Greater Angkor Project, Siem Reap, 2013.
