= Annunciation (Zurbarán) =

Painting by Francisco de Zurbarán

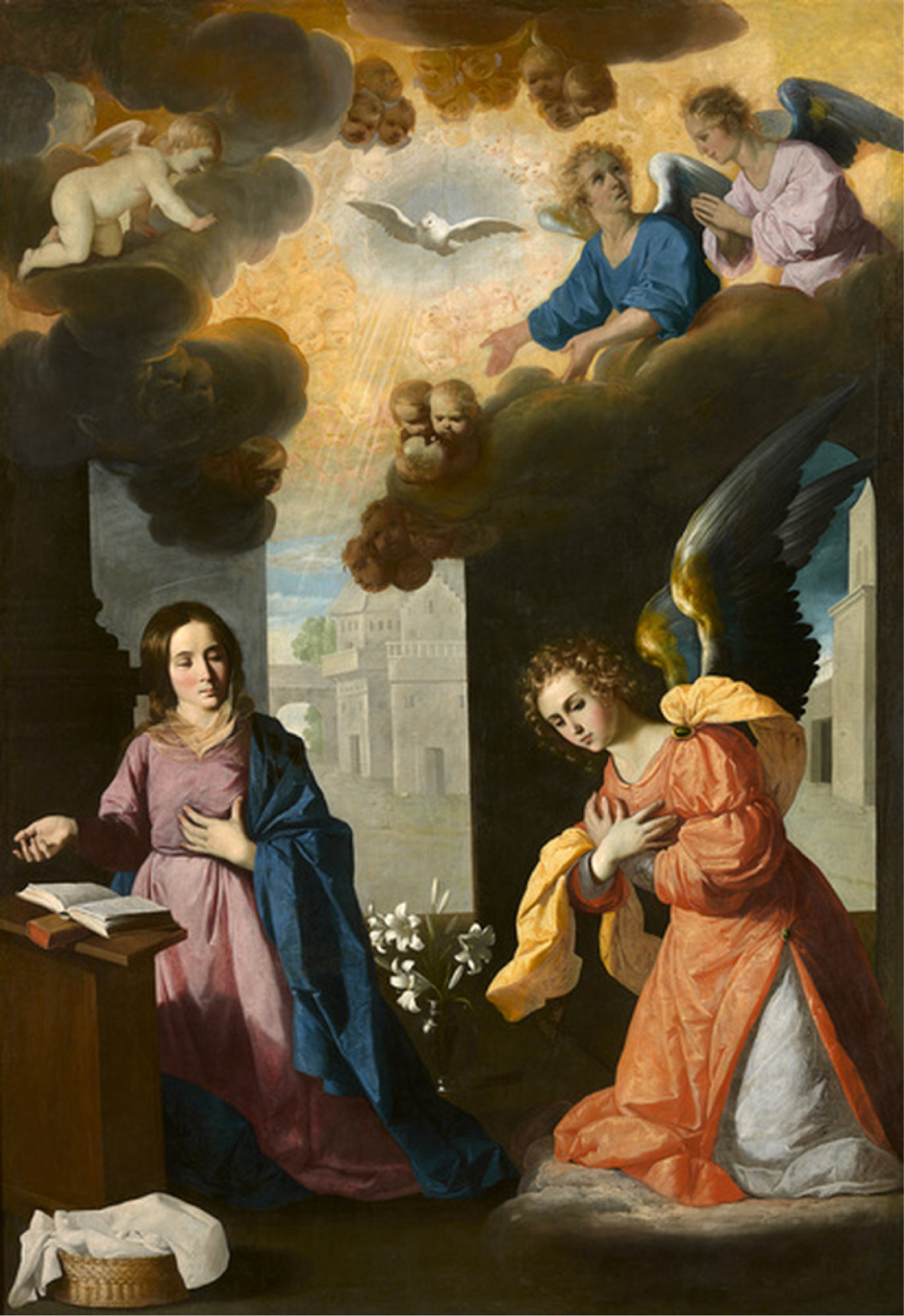

Annunciation is a 1638–1639 oil on canvas painting by Francisco de Zurbarán, now in the Museum of Grenoble, to which it was given by Léon de Beylié in 1901.

It was part of twelve canvases commissioned for the high altar of the Jerez de la Frontera Charterhouse. The altarpiece was dismantled in 1810, and the paintings then travelled and were traded around Europe. Several were acquired by Léon de Beylié and gifted to the Museum of Grenoble in 1901.
