= Robert Calle =

French physiologist and patron of the arts (1920–2015)

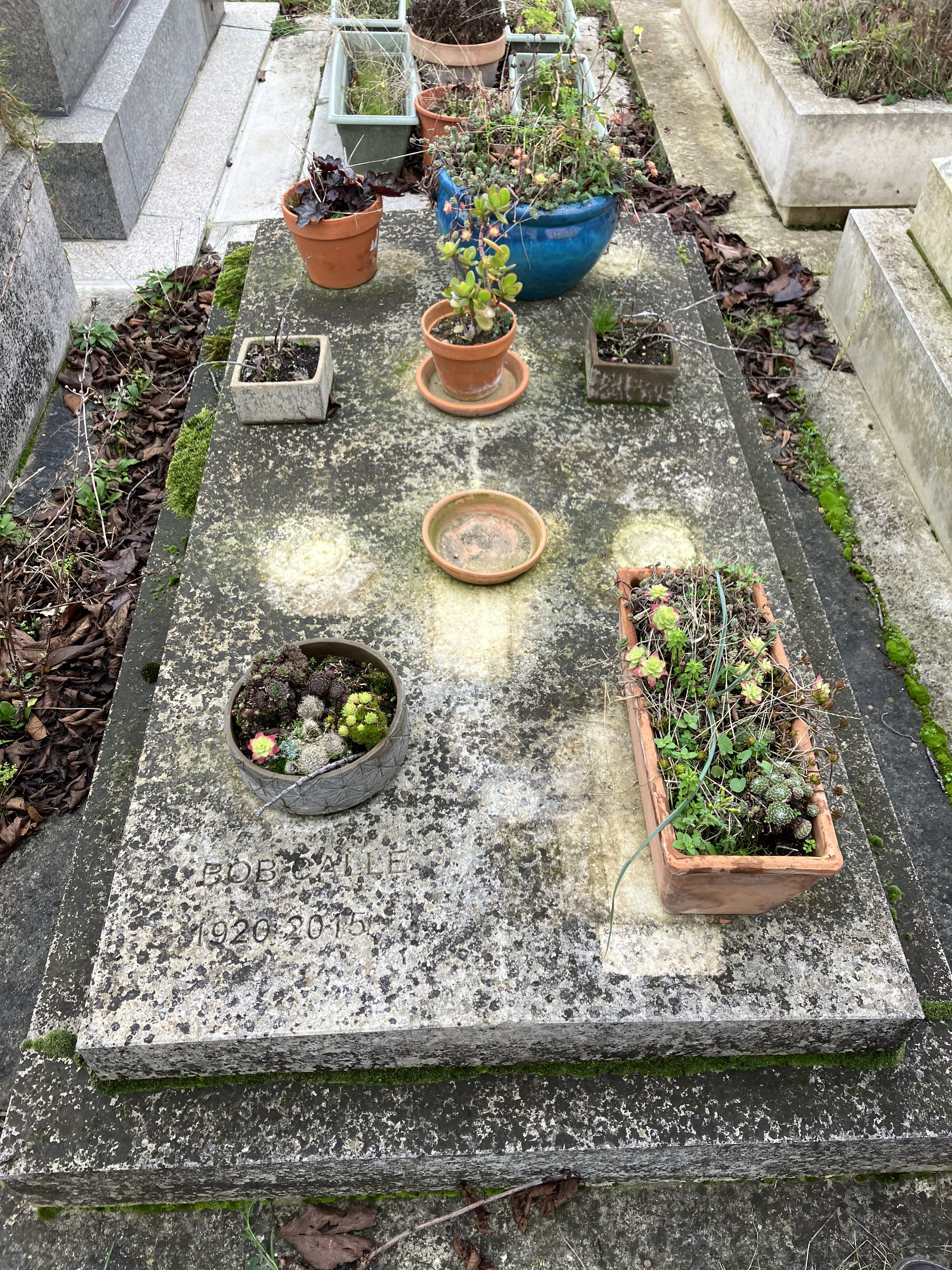
Tomb of Robert Calle.

Robert or Bob Calle (1 October 1920 – 6 April 2015) was a French oncologist, contemporary art collector and museum director. The prix Bob Calle du livre d'artiste, founded in 2017, is named after him.

== Life ==
Born in Aigues-Vives, he arrived in Paris in 1948 as a trainee oncologist and radiologist at the Fondation Curie-Institut du Radium. A pupil of Dr François Baclesse, he promoted a conservative treatment for breast cancer through radiotherapy. From 1973 to 1985 he was director of the medical-hospital section of that foundation, which was renamed the Institut Curie in 1978.

He was friends with several contemporary artists such as César, Arman, Mimmo Rotella, Bernard Quentin, Martial Raysse, Christian Boltanski, Daniel Pommereulle and Annette Messager and his daughter Sophie Calle also developed a taste for contemporary art through meeting them. After retiring from the Institut Curie, in 1985 he was put in charge of planning and developing the Carré d'art's permanent collection by Nîmes' mayor Jean Bousquet. and was that gallery's sole director from 1986 to October 1991 and co-director with Guy Tosatto from then until June 1993.

In the 2000s he began work on a catalogue raisonné of Christian Boltanski's work, whose first volume (covering 1969–1974) was published in 2009. He died in the 14th arrondissement of Paris in 2015 and is buried at Montparnasse Cemetery in the city.

== Publications ==
- Jean-Charles Blais, œuvres 1985–1987, éditions Musée national d'art moderne, 1987 ISBN 2-85850-385-0
- Richard Baquié, with Olivier Kaeppelin and Jean-Marc Ferrari, éditions Carré d'art, 1990 ISBN 290765005X
- Nicola De Maria, Testa Orfica, éditions Carré d'art, 1990
- Christian Boltanski - livre d'artiste , éditions 591, 2008 ISBN 978-2-918074-00-7
- Archives, Christian Boltanski 01 (catalogue raisonné de l'œuvre - tome I), éditions 591, 2009
