= Sophie Calle =

French writer, photographer, installation artist, and conceptual artist

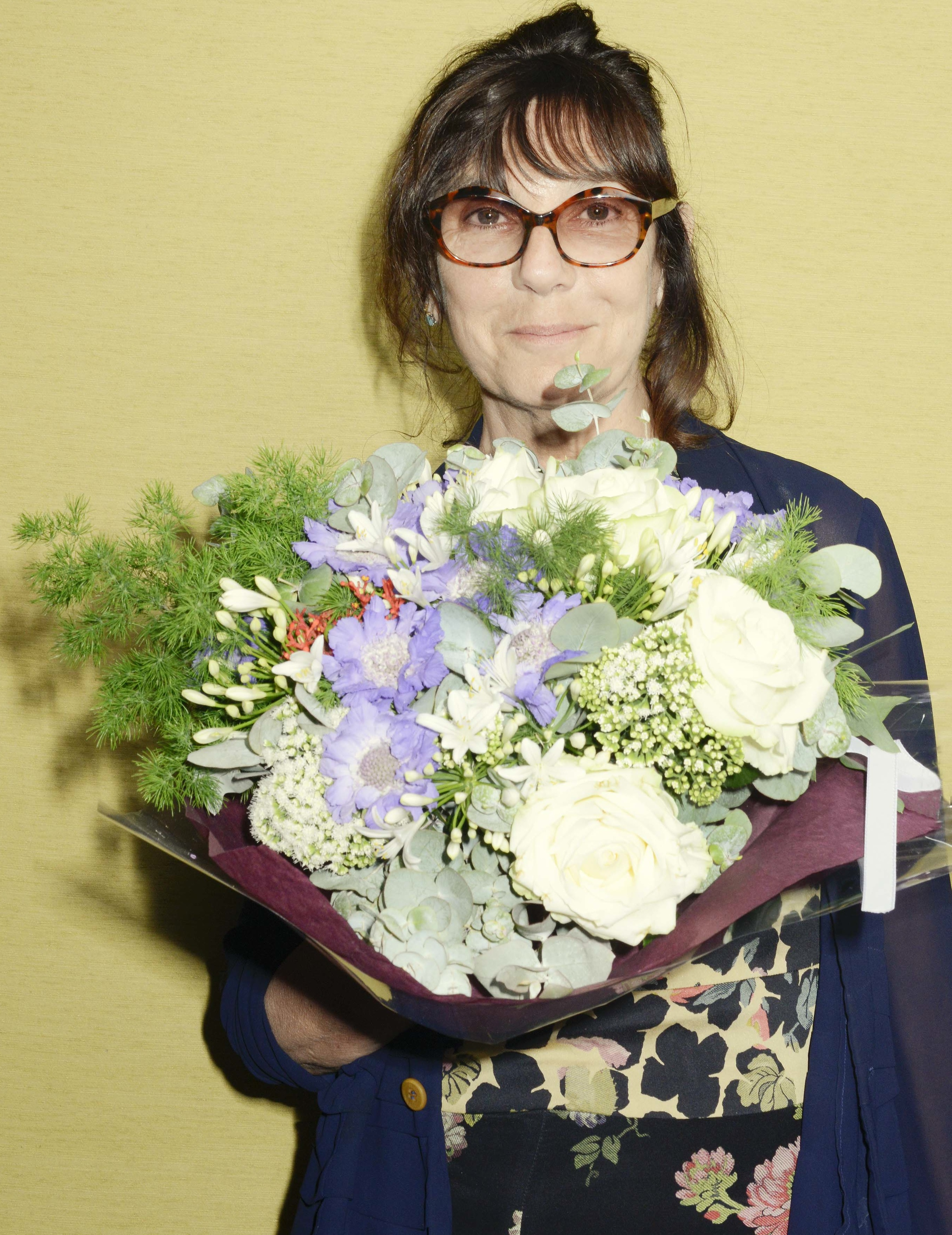
- Calle in 2015
- Born: 9 October 1953 (age 72); Paris, France
- Known for: Conceptual art, installation art

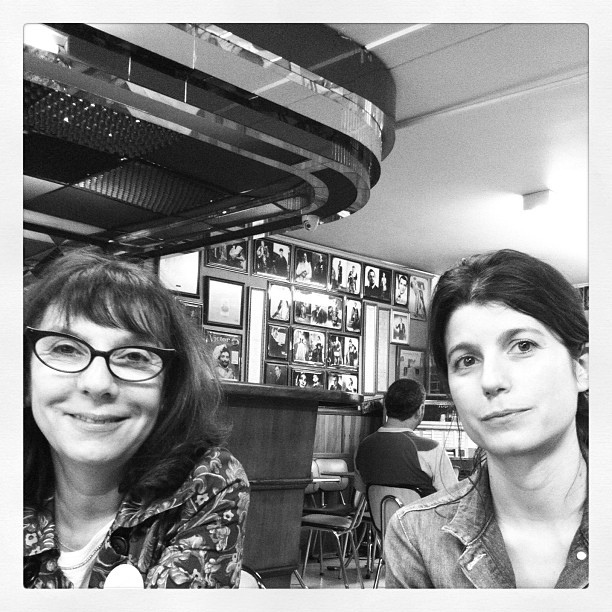
Sophie Calle (left) and Alexandra Cohen

Sophie Calle (French pronunciation: [sɔfi kal]; born 9 October 1953) is a French writer, photographer, installation artist, and conceptual artist. Daughter of the contemporary art collector Robert Calle, Calle's work is distinguished by its use of arbitrary sets of constraints, and evokes the French literary movement known as Oulipo. Her work frequently depicts human vulnerability, and examines identity and intimacy. She is recognized for her detective-like tendency to follow strangers and investigate their private lives. Her photographic work often includes panels of text of her own writing.

Since 2005, Calle has taught as a professor of film and photography at European Graduate School in Saas-Fee, Switzerland. She has lectured at the University of California, San Diego in the Visual Arts Department. She has also taught at Mills College in Oakland, California.

Exhibitions of Calle's work took place at the Centre Georges Pompidou, Paris; Hermitage Museum, St. Petersburg, Russia; Musée d'Art et d'Histoire du Judaïsme, Paris; Paula Cooper Gallery, New York; Palais des Beaux-Arts, Brussels, Belgium; Videobrasil, SESC Pompeia, São Paulo, Brazil; Museum of Modern Art of Bahia, Salvador, Brazil; Whitechapel Gallery, London;, the De Pont Museum of Contemporary Art, Tilburg, Netherlands; the Walker Art Center, Minneapolis, Minnesota, USA; and the Golden Thread Gallery, Belfast.

She represented France at the Venice Biennale in 2007.

In 2017 she was shortlisted for the Deutsche Börse Photography Prize for her publication My All (Actes Sud, 2016). In 2019 she was the recipient of the Royal Photographic Society's Centenary Medal and Honorary Fellowship.

== Works ==
=== 1979–1981 ===
In Suite Venitienne (1979), Calle followed a man she met at a party in Paris to Venice, where she disguised herself and followed him around the city, photographing him. Calle's surveillance of the man, who she identifies only as Henri B., includes black and white photographs accompanied by text.

Calle's first artistic work was The Sleepers (Les Dormeurs), a project in which she invited passers-by to occupy her bed. Some were friends, or friends of friends, and some were strangers to her. She served them food and photographed them every hour.

In order to execute her project The Hotel (1981), she was hired as a chambermaid at a hotel in Venice where she was able to explore the writings and objects of the hotel guests. Insight into her process and its resulting aesthetic can be gained through her account of this project: "I spent one year to find the hotel, I spent three months going through the text and writing it, I spent three months going through the photographs, and I spent one day deciding it would be this size and this frame...it's the last thought in the process."

=== Mid- and late 1980s ===
One of Calle's first projects to generate public controversy was Address Book (1983). The French daily newspaper Libération invited her to publish a series of 28 articles. Having recently found an address book on the street (which she photocopied and returned to its owner), she decided to call some of the telephone numbers in the book and speak with the people about its owner. To the transcripts of these conversations, Calle added photographs of the man's favorite activities, creating a portrait of a man she never met, by way of his acquaintances. The articles were published, but upon discovering them, the owner of the address book, a documentary filmmaker named Pierre Baudry, threatened to sue the artist for invasion of privacy. As Calle reports, the owner discovered a nude photograph of her, and demanded the newspaper publish it, in retaliation for what he perceived to be an unwelcome intrusion into his private life.

Another of Calle's noteworthy projects is titled The Blind (1986), for which she interviewed blind people, and asked them to define beauty. Their responses were accompanied by her photographic interpretation of their ideas of beauty, and portraits of the interviewees.

Calle has created elaborate display cases of birthday presents given to her throughout her life; this process was detailed by Grégoire Bouillier in his memoir The Mystery Guest: An Account (2006). According to Bouillier, the premise of his story was that "A woman who has left a man without saying why calls him years later and asks him to be the 'mystery guest' at a birthday party thrown by the artist Sophie Calle. And by the end of this fashionable—and utterly humiliating—party, the narrator figures out the secret of their breakup."

=== 1990s ===
In 1996, Calle asked Israelis and Palestinians from Jerusalem to take her to public places that became part of their private sphere, exploring how one's personal story can create an intimacy with a place. Inspired by the eruv, the Jewish law that permits to turn a public space into a private area by surrounding it with wires, making it possible to carry objects during the Sabbath, the Erouv de Jérusalem is exhibited at Paris's Musée d'Art et d'Histoire du Judaïsme.

The same year, Calle released a film titled No Sex Last Night which she created in collaboration with American photographer Gregory Shephard. The film documents their road trip across America, which ends in a wedding chapel in Las Vegas. Rather than following the genre conventions of a road trip or a romance, the film is designed to document the result of a man and woman who barely knew each other, embarking on an intimate journey together.

Calle asked writer and filmmaker Paul Auster to "invent a fictive character which I would attempt to resemble" and served as the model for the character Maria in Auster's 1992 novel Leviathan. This mingling of fact and fiction so intrigued Calle that she created the works of art created by the fictional character, which included a series of color-coordinated meals. These works are documented in her publication Double Game (1999).

Auster later challenged Calle to create and maintain a public amenity in New York City. The artist's response was to augment a telephone booth on the corner of Greenwich and Harrison Streets in Manhattan with a note pad, a bottle of water, a pack of cigarettes, flowers, cash, and sundry other items. Every day, Calle cleaned the booth and restocked the items, until the telephone company removed and discarded them. This project is documented in The Gotham Handbook (1998).

In 1999 Calle exhibited the installation "Appointment" especially conceived for the Freud Museum in London, working with the ideas of her private desires. In Room with a View (2002), Calle spent the night in a bed installed at the top of the Eiffel Tower. She invited people to come to her and read her bedtime stories in order to keep her awake through the night. The same year, Calle had her first one-woman show, a retrospective, at the Musée National d'Art Moderne at Centre Georges Pompidou in Paris.

=== 2000s ===
"Douleur Exquise" (exquisite pain) was commissioned in 2003. She reluctantly chose to spend three months in Japan, deciding to make the journey take a month by taking the train through Moscow and through Siberia, then through Beijing, then to Hong Kong. She was supposed to meet her lover in New Delhi, but he didn't turn up, instead sending her a telegram which said he was in an accident and couldn't come. She found out that he only had an infected finger, a felon, and that he had actually found another woman. She took a photograph every day until the day they were supposed to meet in New Delhi, and wrote about how much she looked forward to meeting him. The second half of the book was all about the pain of the heartbreak. She would write about the horrible memory of the conversation where she realized he was breaking up with her on one page, and ask people to tell her their worst memory, which was placed on the right. Over the days, her story became shorter and shorter as her pain dissipated over the time. The juxtaposition of everyone's terrible memories also played down the pain of a simple breakup.

Calle's text Exquisite Pain was adapted into a performance in 2004 by Forced Entertainment, a theatrical company based in Sheffield, England.

At the 2007 Venice Biennale, Calle showed her piece Take Care of Yourself, named after the last line of the email her ex sent her. Calle asked friends, acquaintances, and recommended women of all ages—including a parrot and a hand puppet—to interpret the break-up e-mail and presented the results in the French pavilion. Calle explains the piece as follows: "I received an email telling me it was over. I didn't know how to respond. It was almost as if it hadn't been meant for me. It ended with the words, 'take care of yourself.' And so I did. I asked 107 women, chosen for their profession or skills, to interpret this letter. To analyze it, comment on it, dance it, sing it. Exhaust it. Understand it for me. Answer for me. It was a way of taking the time to break up. A way of taking care of myself." Jessica Lott, winner of the Frieze Writer's Prize for her review of the piece, described it thus: "Take Care of Yourself is a break-up letter (Calle's) then-boyfriend (Grégoire Bouillier, dubbed ‘X’) sent her via e-mail. Calle took the e-mail, and the paralyzing confusion that accompanies the mind's failure to comprehend heartbreak, and distributed it to 107 women of various professions, skills and talents to help her understand it – to interpret, analyze, examine and perform it to gain perspective on her perplexing situation. Calle insists that she did not need the other women's sentiments for herself, but to ensure that the piece was well-rounded. The result of this seemingly obsessive, schoolyard exercise is paradoxically one of the most expansive and telling pieces of art on women and contemporary feminism to pass through (the major art centres) in recent years". At her gallery shows, Calle frequently supplies suggestion forms on which visitors are encouraged to furnish ideas for her art, while she sits beside them with an uninterested expression.

In 2009/2010, a major retrospective exhibition of her work, including Take Care of Yourself, The Sleepers, Address Book and others, was held opened at the Whitechapel Gallery in London. In 2010 another major exhibition opened in Denmark at the Louisiana Museum of Modern Art.

=== 2010s ===
In 2011 her work True Stories was installed at the historic 1850 House at the Pontalba Building at Jackson Square in the French Quarter of New Orleans, Louisiana as part of the Prospect 2 Contemporary Art Festival. The house, an historic museum that is managed as part of the Louisiana State Museum, is furnished with historic furniture as it was in the mid-19th century. The artist inserted her own, personal historical objects and ephemera, with short, narrative explanatory text, into the scenes, affecting the notion that she had occupied the house shortly before the viewers' arrival. Also in 2011, Calle developed For the Last and First Time with the Sakıp Sabancı Museum for the Istanbul Biennial, pairing The Last Image, based on the final visual memories of people who had lost their sight, with Voir la mer, filmed with Istanbul residents seeing the sea for the first time; after its Istanbul presentation from 17 September to 31 December 2011, the project travelled to the Hara Museum of Contemporary Art in Tokyo in 2013, the Toyota Municipal Museum of Art in 2015 and the Nagasaki Prefectural Art Museum in 2016.

In 2012, Calle's The Address Book was published for the first time in its entirety. In 2015, Suite Vénitienne was redesigned and republished.

In 2014, Calle's work Rachel, Monique was displayed at the Episcopal Church of Heavenly Rest in New York City. It involved video Calle took of her mother, Monique Sindler, on her deathbed, as well as excerpts of her diary, read by actress Kim Cattrall. Calle took her mother's portrait and jewelry and buried them at the North Pole. Portraits of her doing so were also on exhibition. In 2017, Calle was commissioned to create a public artwork for Green-Wood Cemetery in Brooklyn, Here Lie the Secrets of the Visitors of Green-Wood Cemetery. The piece will remain in the cemetery for 25 years. In 2017–2018, Calle had a public art installation at Musée de la Chasse et de la Nature (the Museum of Hunting and Nature) in Paris.

=== 2020s ===
Calle's work was featured in a site-specific installation occupying four floors in the Musée Picasso in 2023. Another retrospective, called "Sophie Calle: Overshare", opened in 2024 at the Walker Art Center in Minneapolis with plans to travel to the Orange County Museum of Art. The Minneapolis exhibit debuted Calle’s project “On the Hunt”, which quotes dating ads from a French hunting magazine from 1895 to 2019, during which the men’s concerns shifted from the virginity of their prospective partners to their physical appearance. Alongside these quotes are images of hunted animals and hunting towers.

== Critical analysis ==
Christine Macel described Calle's work as a rejection of the Poststructuralist notion of the "death of the author" by working as a "first-person artist" who incorporates her life into her works and, in a way, redefines the idea of the author.

Angelique Chrisafis, writing in The Guardian, called her "the Marcel Duchamp of emotional dirty laundry". She was among the names in Blake Gopnik's 2011 list "The 10 Most Important Artists of Today", with Gopnik arguing, "It is the unartiness of Calle's work—its refusal to fit any of the standard pigeonholes, or over anyone's sofa—that makes it deserve space in museums."

In 2024, curator Henriette Huldisch noted that Calle's work devised scenarios relevant to how people "perform themselves in our current social media landscape", asking rhetorically, "Is she the original oversharer?"

== Publications ==
=== Books ===
Significant contributions by other authors are noted.

- Suite Vénitienne. Paris: Editions de l'Etoile, 1983. ISBN 978-2-86642-005-5.
  - Suite Vénitienne [English translation]. Seattle: Bay Press, 1988. ISBN 978-0-941920-09-4.
  - Suite Vénitienne [English translation]. Los Angeles: Siglio, 2015 ISBN 978-1-938221-09-5.
- L'Hôtel. Paris: Editions de l'Etoile, 1984. ISBN 978-2-86642-015-4.
- La Fille du Docteur. New York: Thea Westreich, 1991. OCLC 24809451.
- Des Histoires Vraies. Arles, France: Actes Sud, 1994. ISBN 978-2-7427-0342-5.
  - True Stories [English translation and revision, 1st edition]. Arles, France: Actes Sud, 2013. ISBN 978-2-330-02341-6.
- Die Entfernung. Dresden: Verl. der Kunst, 1996. OCLC 248791020.
  - The Detachment [English translation]. G+B Arts International and Arndt & Partner Gallery, 1996. OCLC 38067246.
- L'Erouv de Jérusalem. Arles, France: Actes Sud, 1996. ISBN 978-2-7427-0964-9.
- Doubles-Jeux. Arles, France: Actes Sud, 1998. Seven volumes:
  - I. De l'Obéissance. ISBN 978-2-7427-1864-1.
  - II. Le Rituel d'Anniversaire. ISBN 978-2-7427-1865-8.
  - III. Les Panoplies: La Garde-Robe; Le Strip-Tease. ISBN 978-2-7427-1863-4.
  - IV. À Suivre: Préambule; Suite Vénitienne; La Filature. ISBN 978-2-7427-1867-2.
  - V. L'Hôtel. ISBN 978-2-7427-1868-9.
  - VI. Le Carnet d'Adresses. ISBN 978-2-7427-1869-6.
  - VII. Gotham Handbook: New York Mode d'Emploi (with Paul Auster). ISBN 978-2-7427-1870-2.
- Double Game [English translation and revision of Doubles-Jeux]. With Paul Auster. London: Violette, 1999. ISBN 978-1-900828-06-2.
  - Double Game, second edition. London: Violette, 2007. ISBN 978-1-900828-28-4.
- Souvenirs de Berlin-Est. Arles, France: Actes Sud, 1999. ISBN 978-2-7427-2602-8.
- Disparitions. Arles, France: Actes Sud, 2000. ISBN 978-2-7427-2803-9.
  - Detachment [English translation]. Arles, France: Actes Sud, 2013. ISBN 978-2-330-01980-8.
- Les Dormeurs. Arles, France: Actes Sud, 2000. ISBN 978-2-7427-3038-4.
- Fantômes. Arles, France: Actes Sud, 2000. ISBN 978-2-7427-2802-2.
  - Ghosts [English translation]. Arles, France: Actes Sud, 2013. ISBN 978-2-330-02014-9.
- L'Absence [set with Souvenirs de Berlin-Est, Disparitions, and Fantômes]. Arles, France: Actes Sud, 2000. ISBN 978-2-7427-2801-5.
- M'as-Tu Vue. Paris: Centre Georges Pompidou and Xavier Barral, 2003. ISBN 978-2-84426-220-2.
  - Did You See Me? [English translation]. Munich and London: Prestel, 2004. ISBN 978-3-7913-3035-8.
- Douleur Exquise. Arles, France: Actes Sud, 2003. ISBN 978-2-7427-4513-5.
  - Exquisite Pain [English translation]. London: Thames & Hudson, 2004. ISBN 978-0-500-51198-5.
- Appointment with Sigmund Freud. London: Thames & Hudson; London: Violette, 2005. ISBN 978-0-500-51199-2.
- En Finir. Arles, France: Actes Sud, 2005. With Fabio Balducci. ISBN 978-2-7427-5177-8.
- Take Care of Yourself = Prenez Soin de Vous. Arles, France: Actes Sud, 2007. ISBN 978-2-7427-6835-6.
- True Stories: Hasselblad Award 2010. Göttingen, Germany: Steidl, 2010. ISBN 978-3-86930-156-3.
- Blind. Arles, France: Actes Sud, 2011. ISBN 978-2-330-00058-5.
- The Address Book. Los Angeles: Siglio, 2012. ISBN 978-0-9799562-9-4.
- Rachel, Monique... Paris: Xavier Barral, 2012. ISBN 978-2-915173-78-9.
- Voir la Mer. Arles, France: Actes Sud, 2013. ISBN 978-2-330-01616-6.
- My All. Arles, France: Actes Sud, 2016. ISBN 978-2-330-05369-7.
- Ainsi de Suite. Paris: Xavier Barral, 2016. ISBN 978-2-36511-046-4.
  - And So Forth [English translation]. Munich: Prestel, 2016. ISBN 978-3-7913-8204-3.
- Parce Que. Paris: Xavier Barral, 2018. ISBN 978-2-36511-207-9.
- Que Faites-Vous de Vos Morts? Arles, France: Actes Sud, 2019. ISBN 978-2-330-11364-3.
- The Hotel Catskill, NY: Siglio, 2021. ISBN 978-1-938221-29-3.

=== Audio releases ===
- Samba de Monalisa. Tetine vs Sophie Calle. (CD, Sulfur Records, 2002)
- Souris Calle (Triple LP, 2018). Produced for an exhibition at Galerie Perrotin. 38 tracks by different artist about Calle's cat of 18 years. Artists include Laurie Anderson, Bono, Michael Stipe, Jean-Michel Jarre, Pharrell Williams, Jarvis Cocker.

== Awards ==
- 2010: Hasselblad Award
- 2017: Shortlisted for the Deutsche Börse Photography Prize for My All (Actes Sud, 2016).
- 2019: Centenary Medal, Royal Photographic Society
- 2024 Praemium Imperiale

== Gallery ==
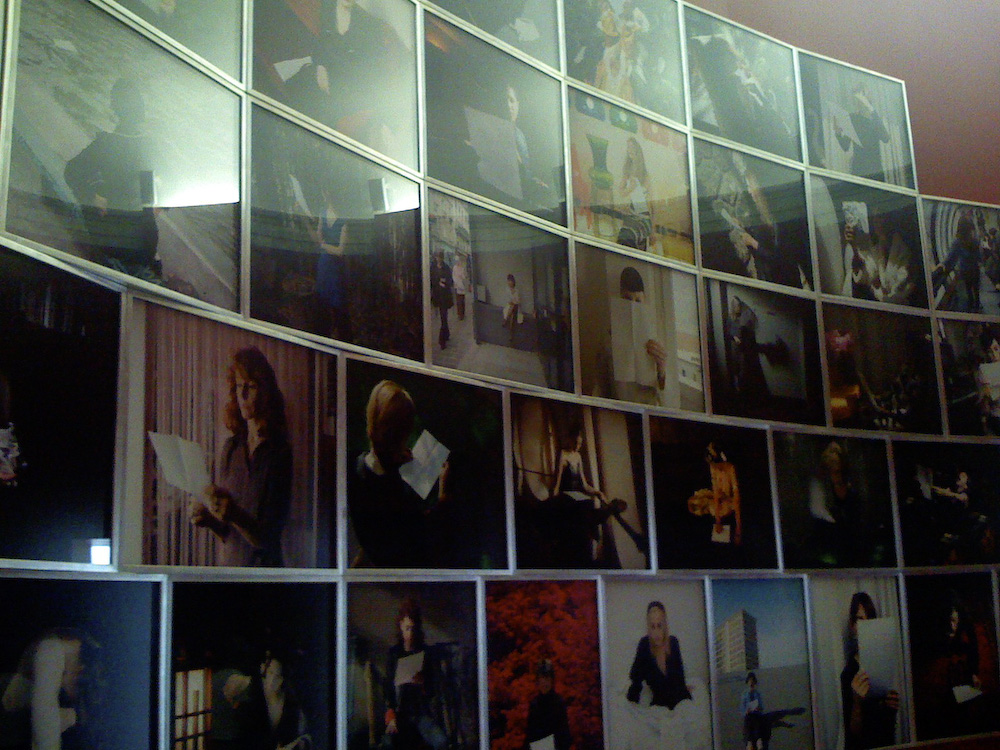

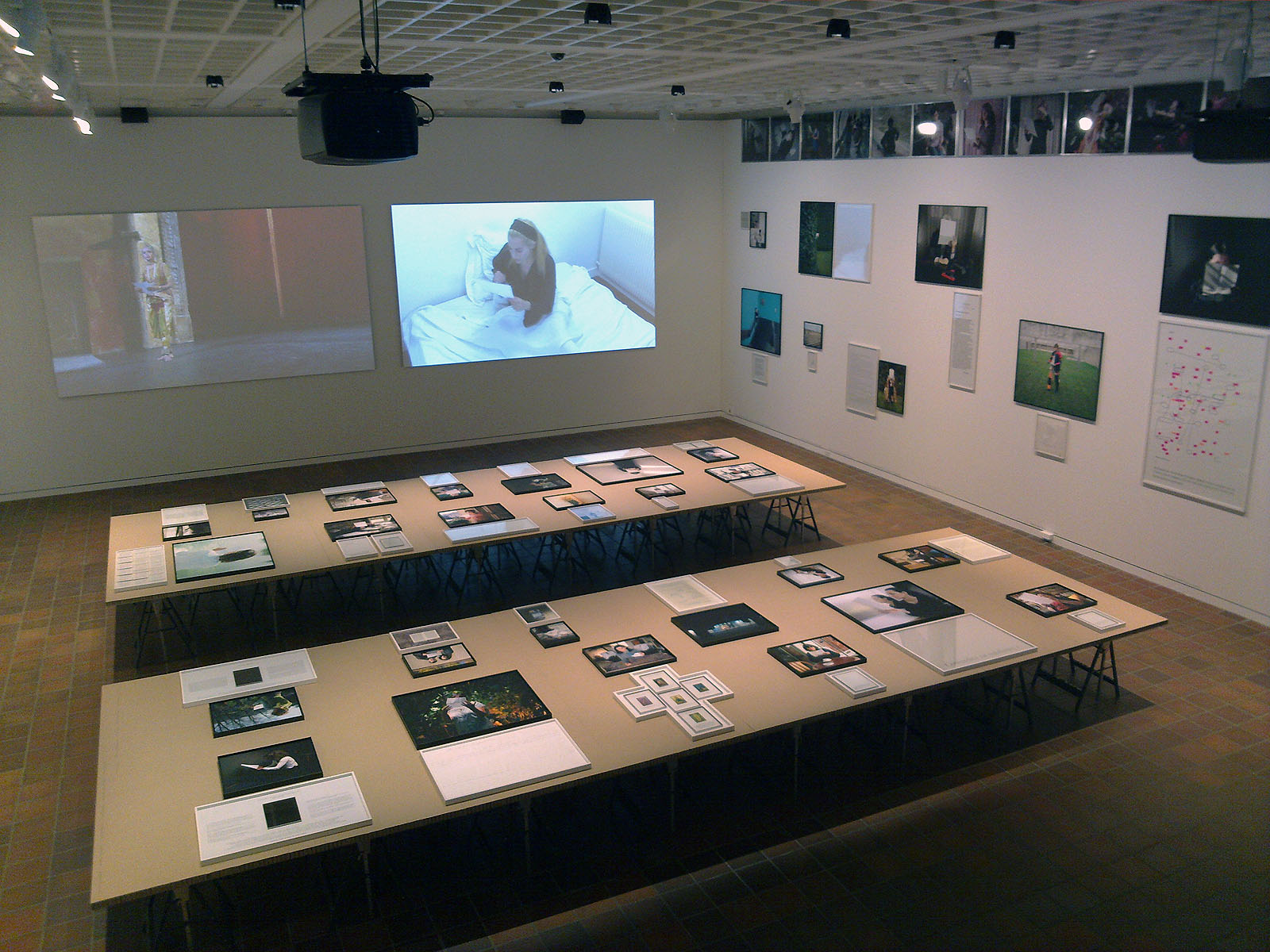

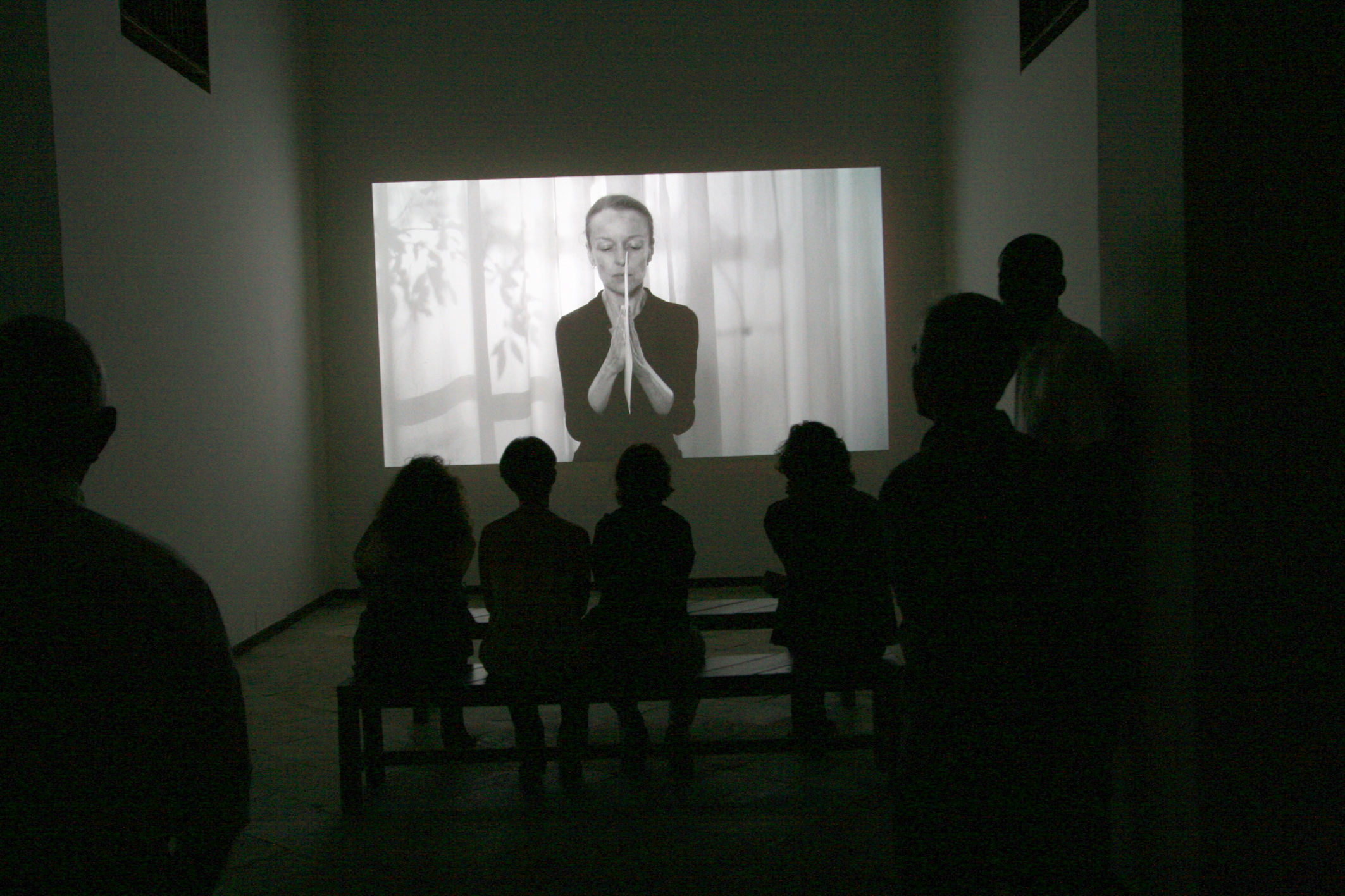

== Sources ==
- Greenough, Sarah; Nelson, Andrea; Kennel, Sarah; Waggoner, Diane; Ureña, Leslie (2015). The Memory of Time: Contemporary Photographs at the National Gallery of Art. National Gallery of Art. ISBN 978-0-500-54449-5.
- Dallow, Jessica, "CALLE, Sophie: French photographer and installation artist," Contemporary Women Artists. St. James Press, 1999.
- Fabian Stech, J'ai parlé avec Lavier, Annette Messager, Sylvie Fleury, Hirschhorn, Pierre Huyghe, Delvoye, D.F.-G. Hou Hanru, Sophie Calle, Yan Pei-Ming, Sans et Bourriaud. Presses du réel Dijon, 2007.
- Gabrielle Moser, 'Working-through' public and private labour: Sophie Calle's Prenez soin de vous' n.paradoxa:international feminist art journal vol.27 January 2011 pp. 5–13.
