= Battle of Ba Dau 1128 =

Battle in Southeast Asia

Battle of Ba Dau
- Part of Đại Việt–Khmer War
Date	January–February 1128
Location	Ba Dau (today is location at Nghệ An province, Vietnam)
Result	Đại Việt victory

Belligerents
Đại Việt	Khmer Empire; Champa; Sukhothai (vassal state)

Commanders and leaders
Lý Công Bình	None

Strength
Unknown	20,000 troops

Casualties and losses
200 dead	169 soldiers captured

Battle of Ba Dau (Vietnamese language: trận Ba Đầu or trận bến Ba Đầu) was in year 1128 between Đại Việt under the Ly dynasty and Khmer Empire at Nghệ An, the south of Đại Việt. Result of battle is the victory of the Ly dynasty. This is the very first conflict between the two countries which later escalated into the Đại Việt–Khmer War that lasted until 1150.

== Course ==
Since the beginning of the Lý dynasty, Đại Việt and Khmer empire had many diplomatic exchanges. In this relationship, Khmer was in the position of a vassal state, obliged to pay tribute to Đại Việt, with the first tribute taking place in 1012, under emperor Lý Thái Tổ. After being enthroned in 1113, Suryavarman II of the Khmer empire soon launched multiple campaign to expand its territory. With Đại Việt, Suryavarman II paid tribute once, in 1120.

In January 1128, Lý Dương Hoán became the emperor with the era name of Thiên Thuận. In that same month, more than 20,000 Khmer troops (known as Chenla to the Vietnamese at this time) raided the Ba Đầu port in Nghệ An province. The emperor issued an imperial edict assigning general Lý Công Bình to lead the army in Nghệ An to counter the attack from the Khmer. In February 1128, Lý Công Bình defeated the Đại Việt forces stuffing 200 dead, Khmer troops and captured their chief commander along with the remnant forces. Upon receiving news of the victory, the emperor performed several rituals in Thái Thanh and Cảnh Linh palaces, as well as in several pagodas inside the capital, to thank Heaven and Buddha for blessing the triumph. That act was criticized by historian Lê Văn Hưu for showing insufficient respect to the general and soldiers who fought in the war.

Later in March 1128, Lý Công Bình led his troops back to the capital and presented 169 captives to the imperial court. That marked the end of this battle as the first conflict between two countries.

== Aftermath ==
There are no historical records of the casualties on either side. The two countries refused to make peace after the conflict, as another raid by the Khmer Empire against Đại Việt broke out in August of the same year. The Khmer empire ceased paying tribute to Đại Việt after this conflict, since several subsequent clashes broke out between the two countries, later known as the Đại Việt–Khmer War.

In The Ancient Khmer Empire (1951), Lawrence Palmer Briggs claimed that Suryavarman II personally led the battle of Ba Đầu, whereas no Vietnamese historical record such as Đại Việt sử ký toàn thư mentions the presence of the Khmer emperor in that battle. Since Vietnamese historical record states that the chief commander was captured in the battle, Suryavarman II was likely not present, or he may have successfully fled when his troops were defeated.

In August 1128, 700 Khmer ships raided the town of Hương Gia in Nghệ An but were defeated by the Đại Việt's army. The people of Nghệ An province then submitted a petition to the emperor, requesting an envoy be sent to the Khmer Empire to make peace, but the emperor gave no reply. Tensions continued between the two countries.
