= Beng Mealea =

- ប្រាសាទបឹងមាលា
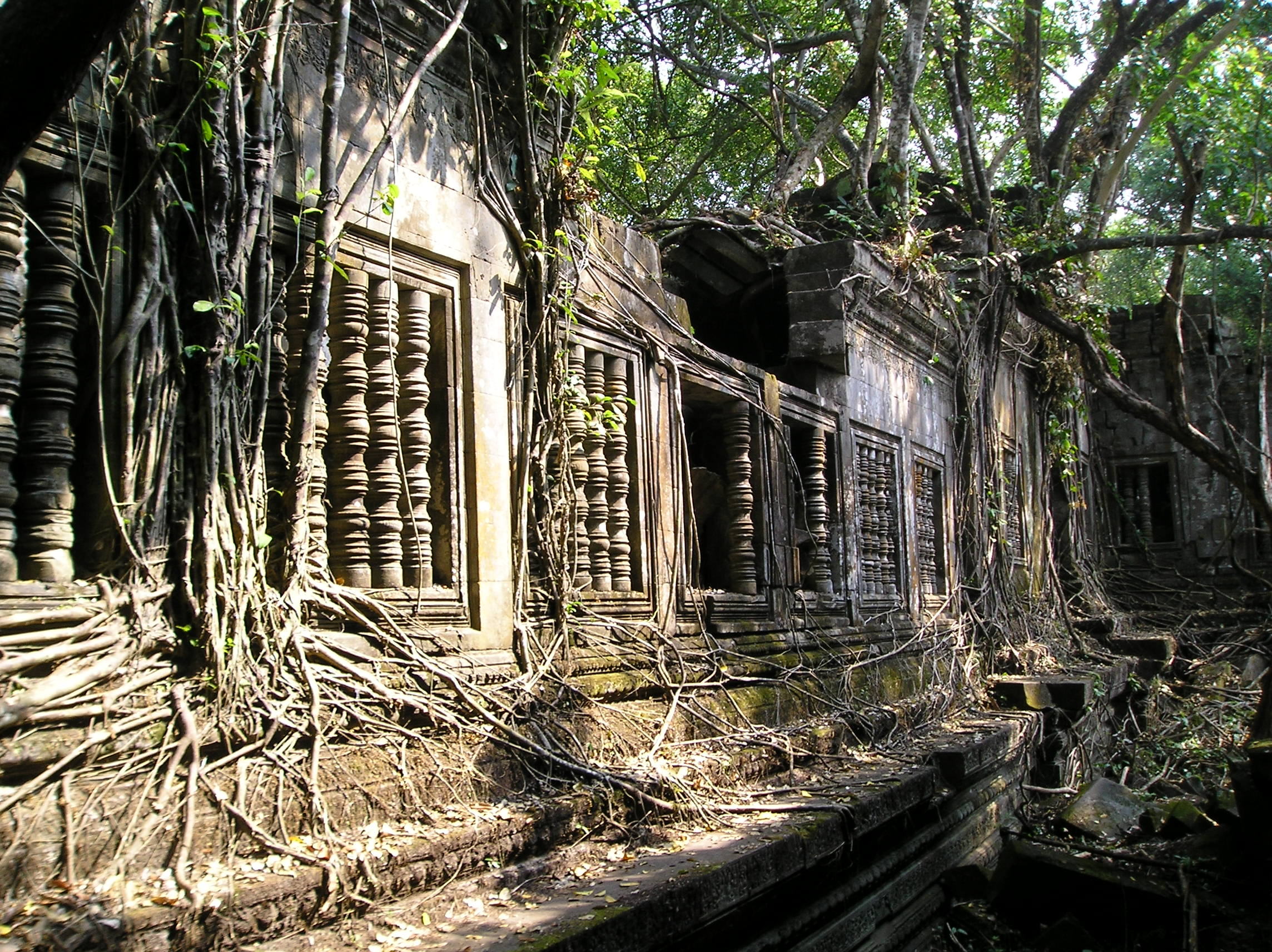
- Walls and windows at Beng Mealea

- Location in Cambodia

Religion
- Affiliation: Hinduism
- Province: Siem Reap
- Deity: Vishnu

Location
- Location: 40 km (25 mi) east of the main group of temples at Angkor
- Country: Cambodia
- Coordinates: 13°28′35″N 104°14′18″E

Architecture
- Type: Khmer
- Creator: Suryavarman II
- Completed: early 12th century

Beng Mealea (Khmer: បឹងមាលា, UNGEGN: Bœ̆ng Méaléa, ALA-LC: Pẏng Mālā [ɓəŋ miəliə], "Lotus Pond"), or Boeng Mealea, is a temple from the Angkor Wat period located 40 km (25 mi) east of the main group of temples at Angkor, Cambodia, on the ancient royal highway to Preah Khan Kompong Svay.

== The temple ==
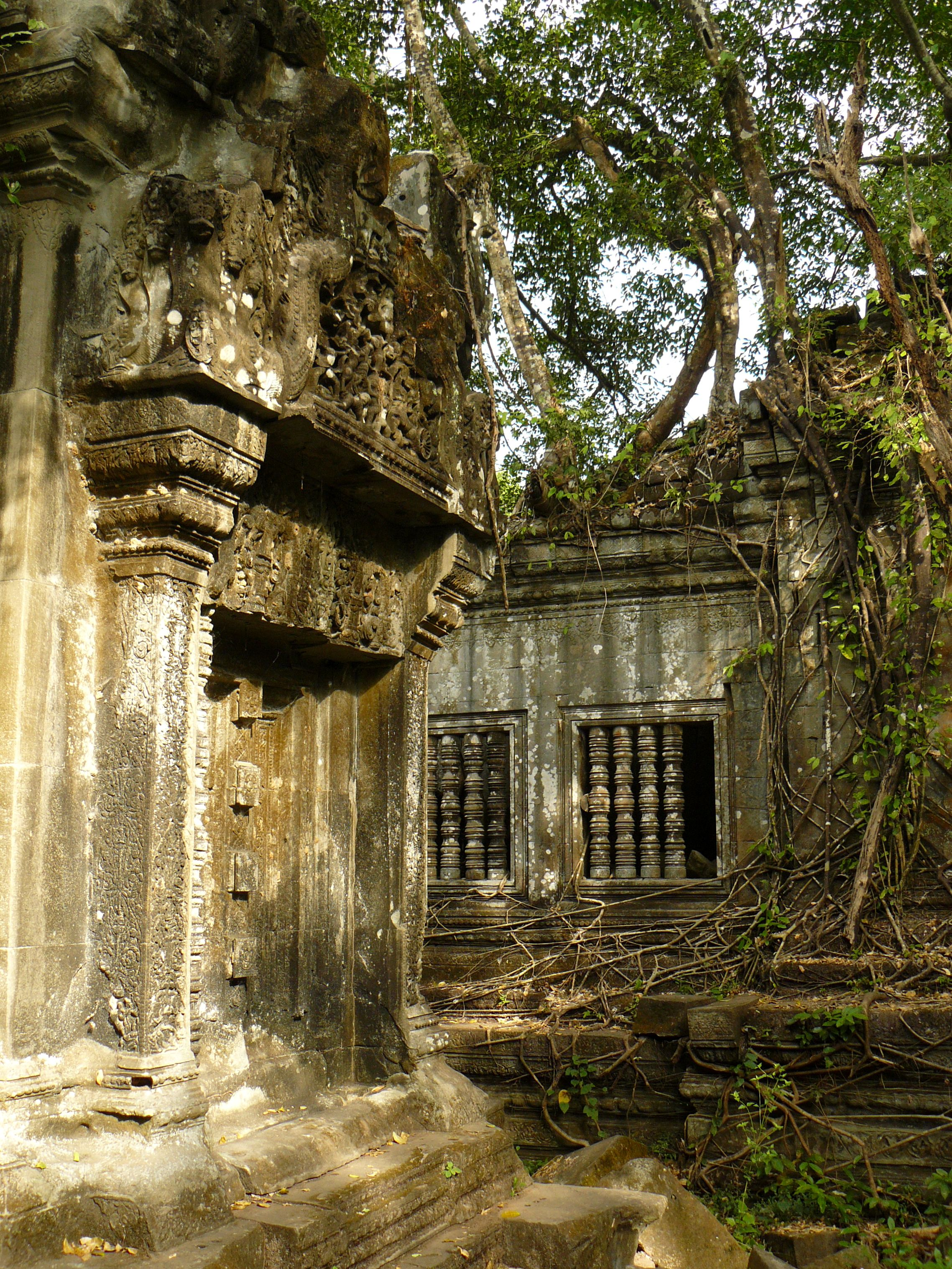
The ruins of Beng Mealea

Beng Mealea was built as a Hindu temple, but some carvings depict Buddhist motifs. Its primary material is sandstone and it is largely unrestored, with trees and thick brush thriving amidst its towers and courtyards and many of its stones lying in great heaps. For years it was difficult to reach, but a road recently built to the temple complex of Koh Ker passes Beng Mealea and more visitors are coming to the site.

The history of the temple is unknown and it can be dated only by its architectural style, identical to Angkor Wat, so scholars assumed it was built during the reign of king Suryavarman II in the early 12th century. Smaller in size than Angkor Wat, the king's main monument, Beng Mealea nonetheless ranks among the Khmer Empire's larger temples: the gallery which forms the outer enclosure of the temple is 181 m by 152 m. It was the center of a town, surrounded by a moat 1025 m by 875 m large and 45 m wide.

Beng Mealea is oriented toward the east, but has entranceways from the other three cardinal directions. The basic layout is three enclosing galleries around a central sanctuary, collapsed at present. The enclosures are tied with "cruciform cloisters", like Angkor Wat. Structures known as libraries lie to the right and left of the avenue that leads in from the east. There is extensive carving of scenes from Hindu mythology, including the Churning of the Sea of Milk and Vishnu being borne by the bird god Garuda. Causeways have long balustrades formed by bodies of the seven-headed Naga serpent.

It was built mostly of sandstone: Beng Mealea is only 7 km far from the angkorian sandstone quarries of Phnom Kulen, as the crow flies. Presumably sandstone blocks used for Angkor were transported along artificial water canals and passed from here. Despite lack of information, the quality of architecture and decorations has drawn the attention of French scholars just from its discovery.

== Restoration ==
Between 2024 and 2025 the APSARA National Authority excavated and restored the temple's eastern causeway, in a project funded by the Lancang–Mekong Cooperation Special Fund. Archaeological excavation began in June 2024 and found that the floor of the causeway had collapsed and its foundations had separated.

The restored section is approximately 100 m long and 13 m wide and includes twelve pillars and thirteen drainage channels; the naga balustrades, beams and pillars were returned to their original positions. The authority reported the causeway fully restored in July 2025, and it was inaugurated on 31 July 2025, at which point a second phase of work covering the wider temple complex was announced. The authority also carried out salvage excavation of the western causeway in March 2025.

The wooden walkway used by visitors to cross the collapsed centre of the temple is 250 m long. Repair of the first 189 m began in October 2025 and was carried out from south to north, towards the temple's main entrance; the earlier walkway had decayed with age and exposure. The rebuilt section reopened in early April 2026, widened from 1.30 m to 1.70 m, after approximately seven months of work.

== World Heritage Status ==
This site was added to the UNESCO World Heritage Tentative List on March 27, 2020 (originally proclaimed December 1, 1992) in the Cultural category .

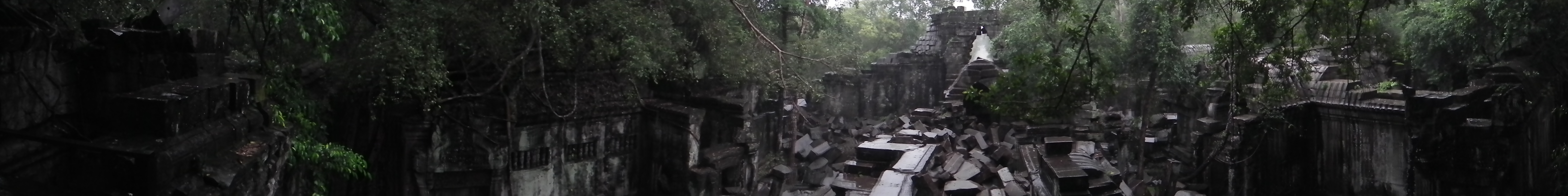
Beng Mealea which has some dilapidation.

== Gallery ==
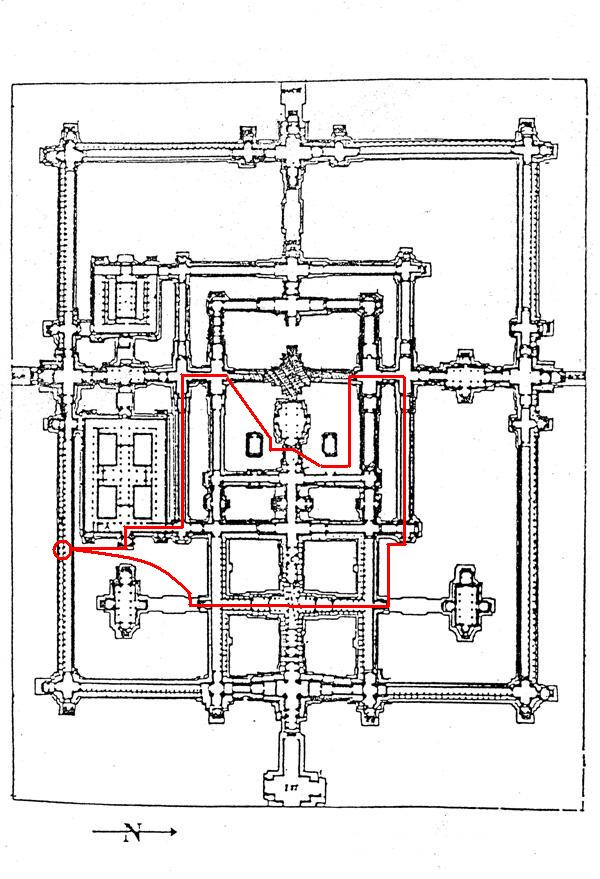
Map of Beng Mealea, from a drawing by Léon de Beylié (1849-1910). In red the partially equipped path used to visit the temple.

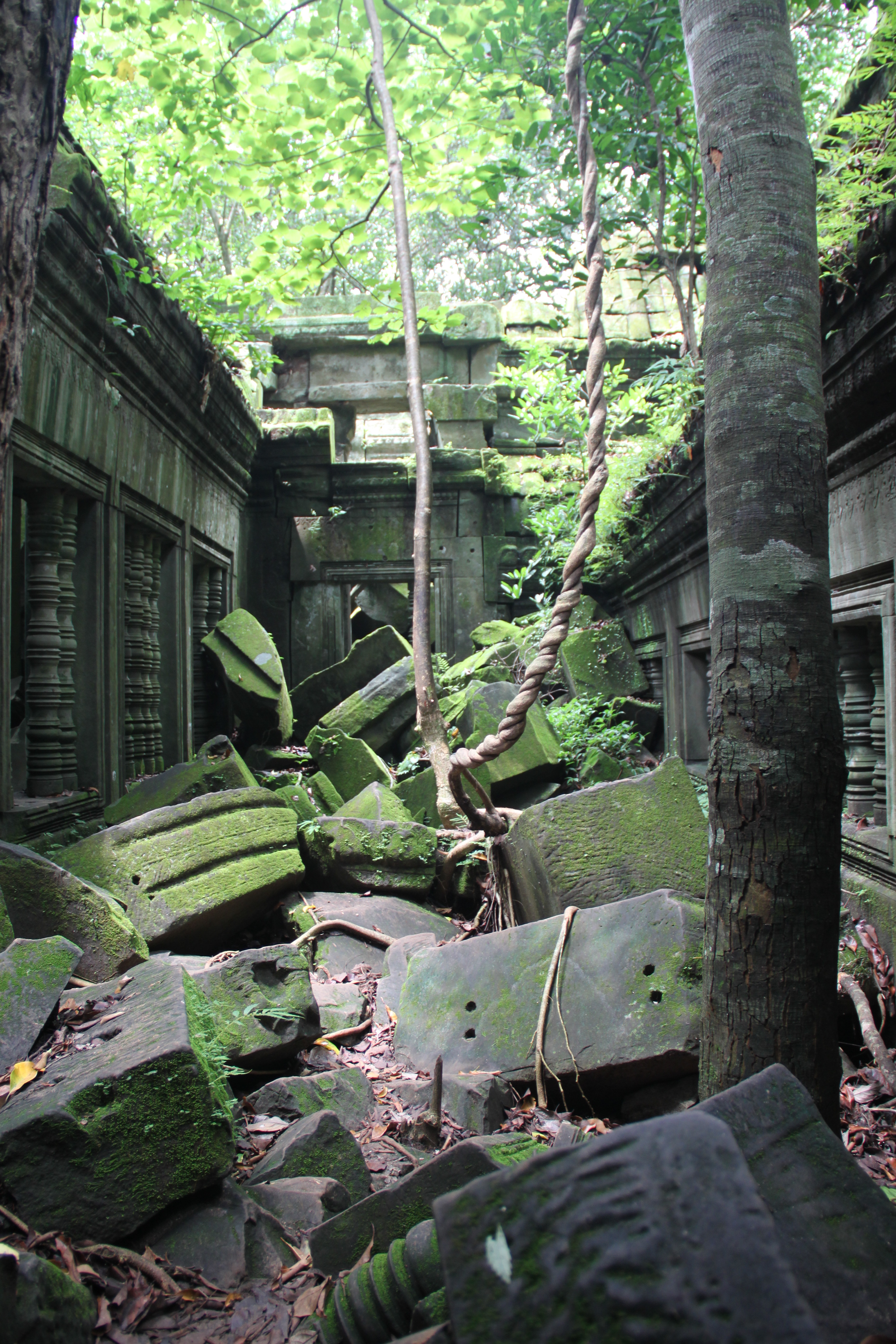
Collapse stone inside the temple complex.

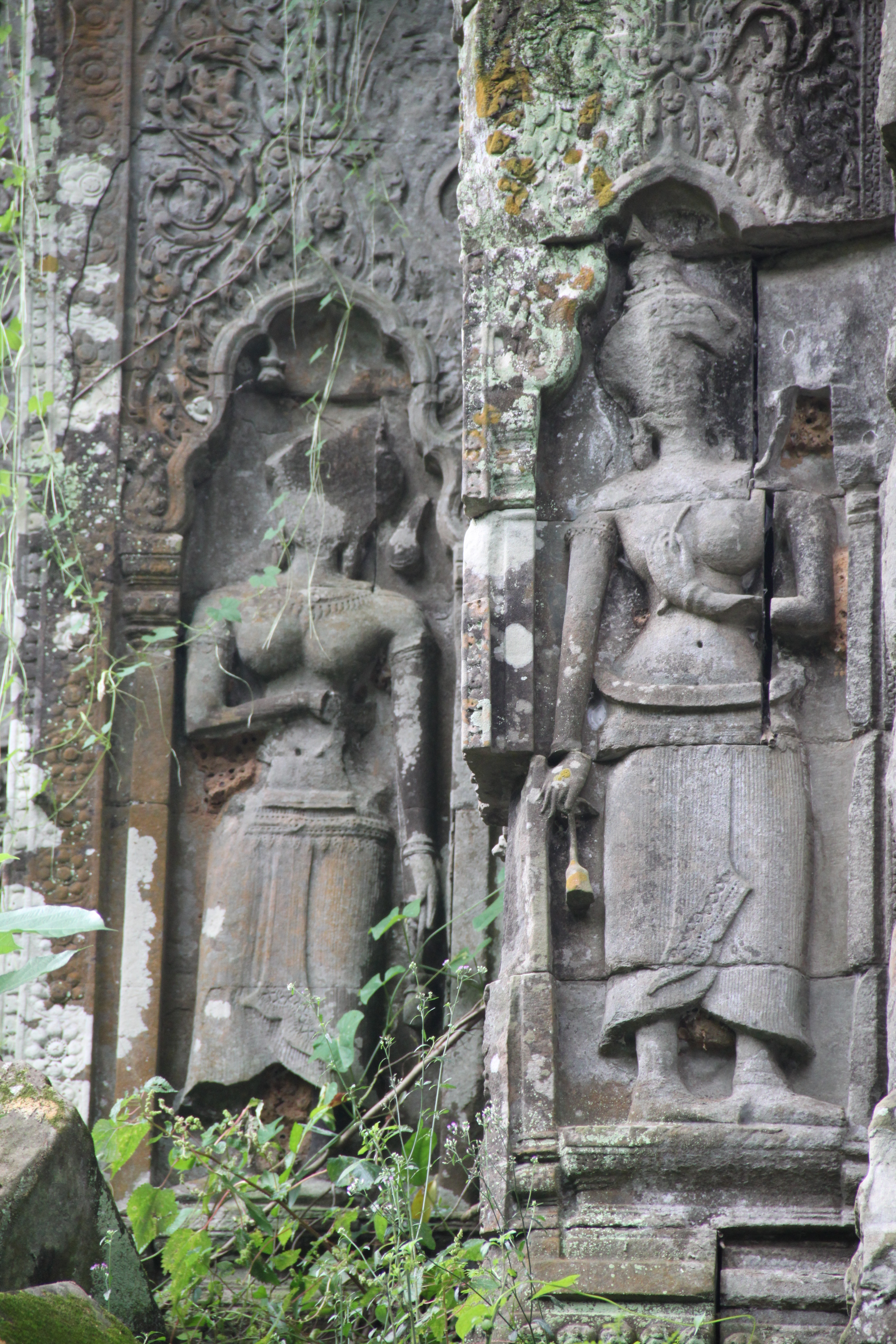
Carvings of female deities.

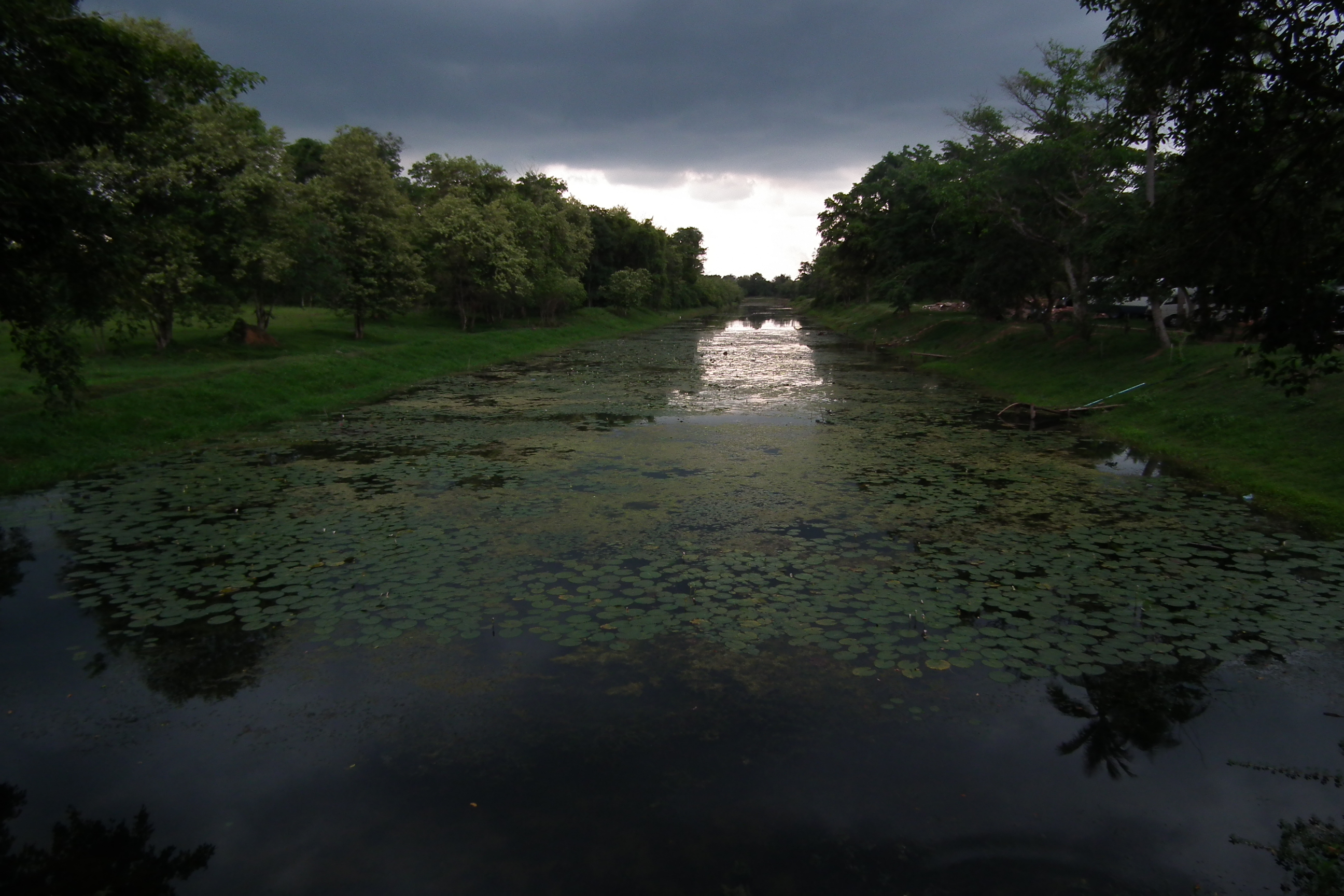
Circular moat of Beng Mealea.

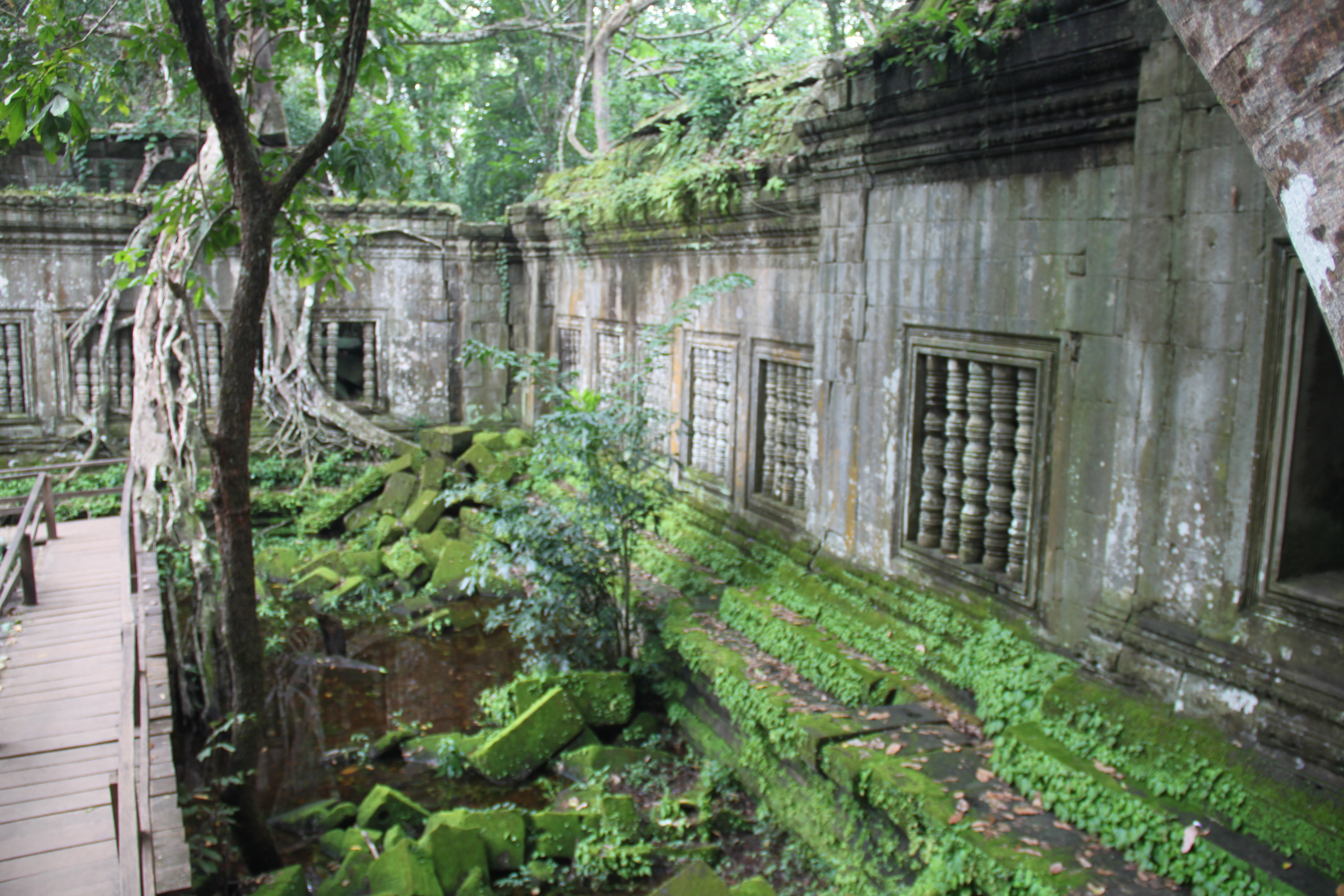

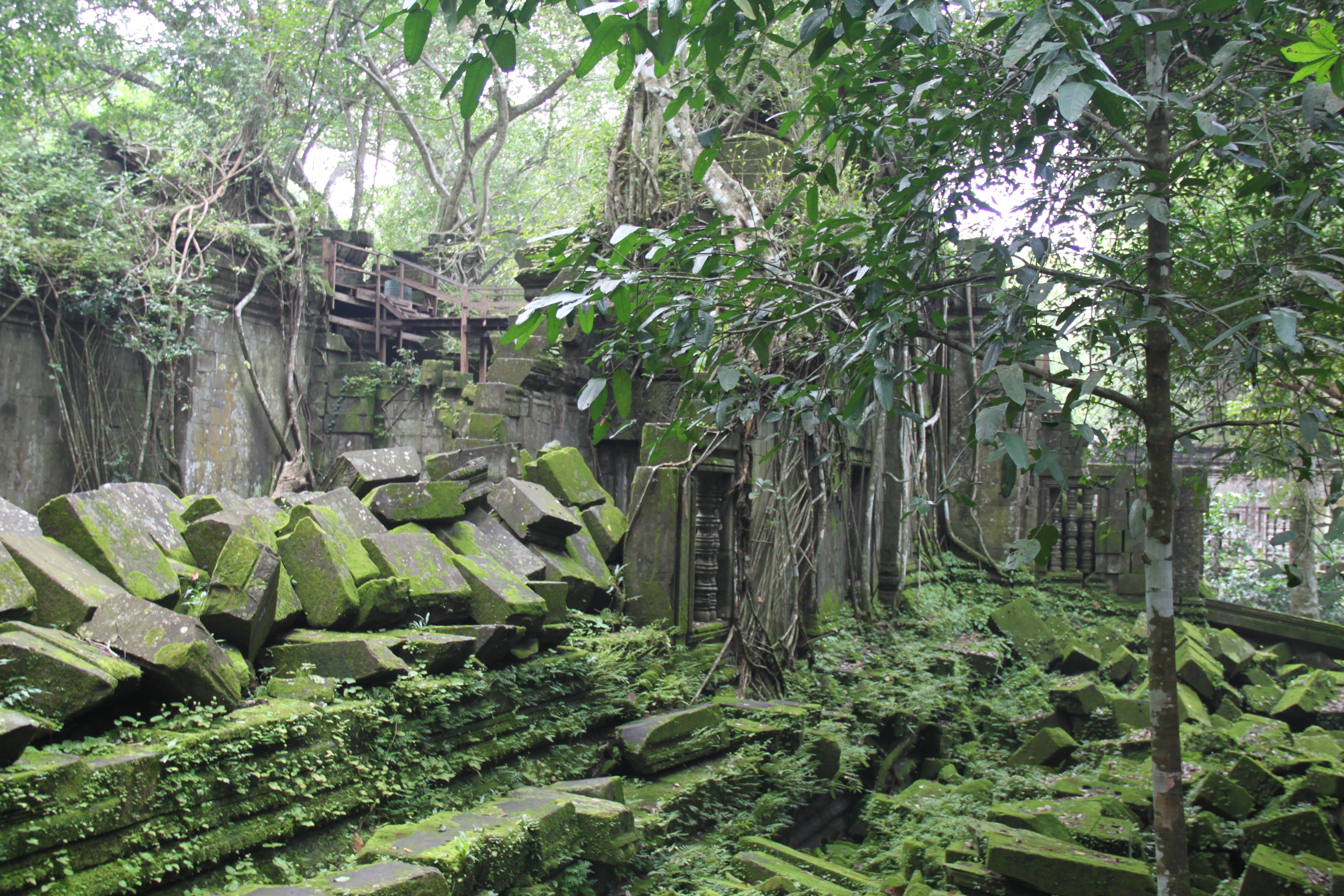

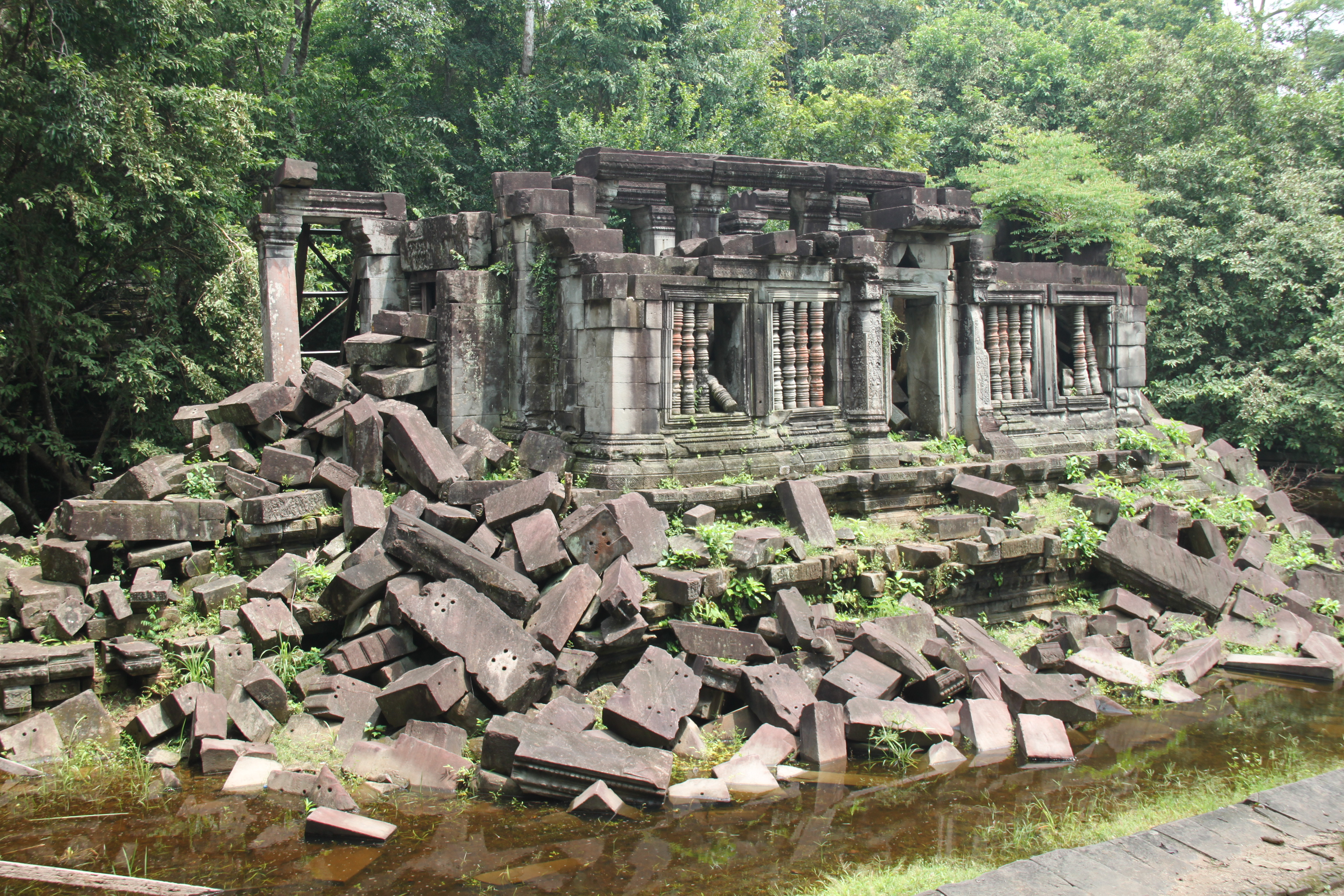
One of the raised libraries of the outer enclosure.

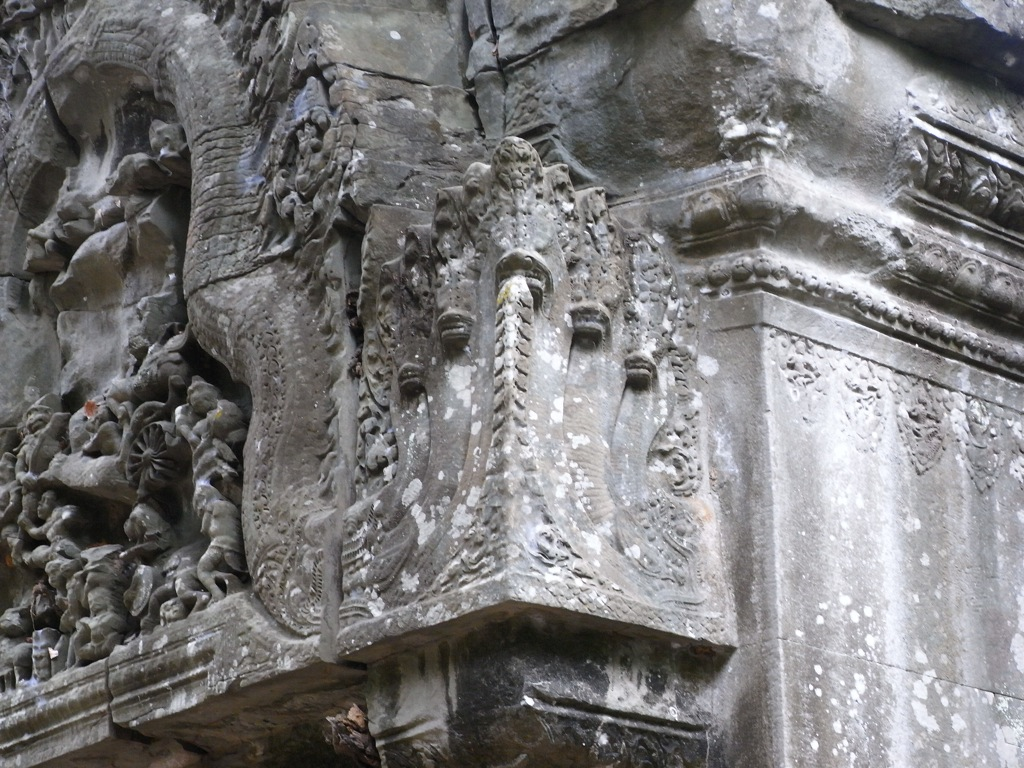
The fine carvings on the pediments.

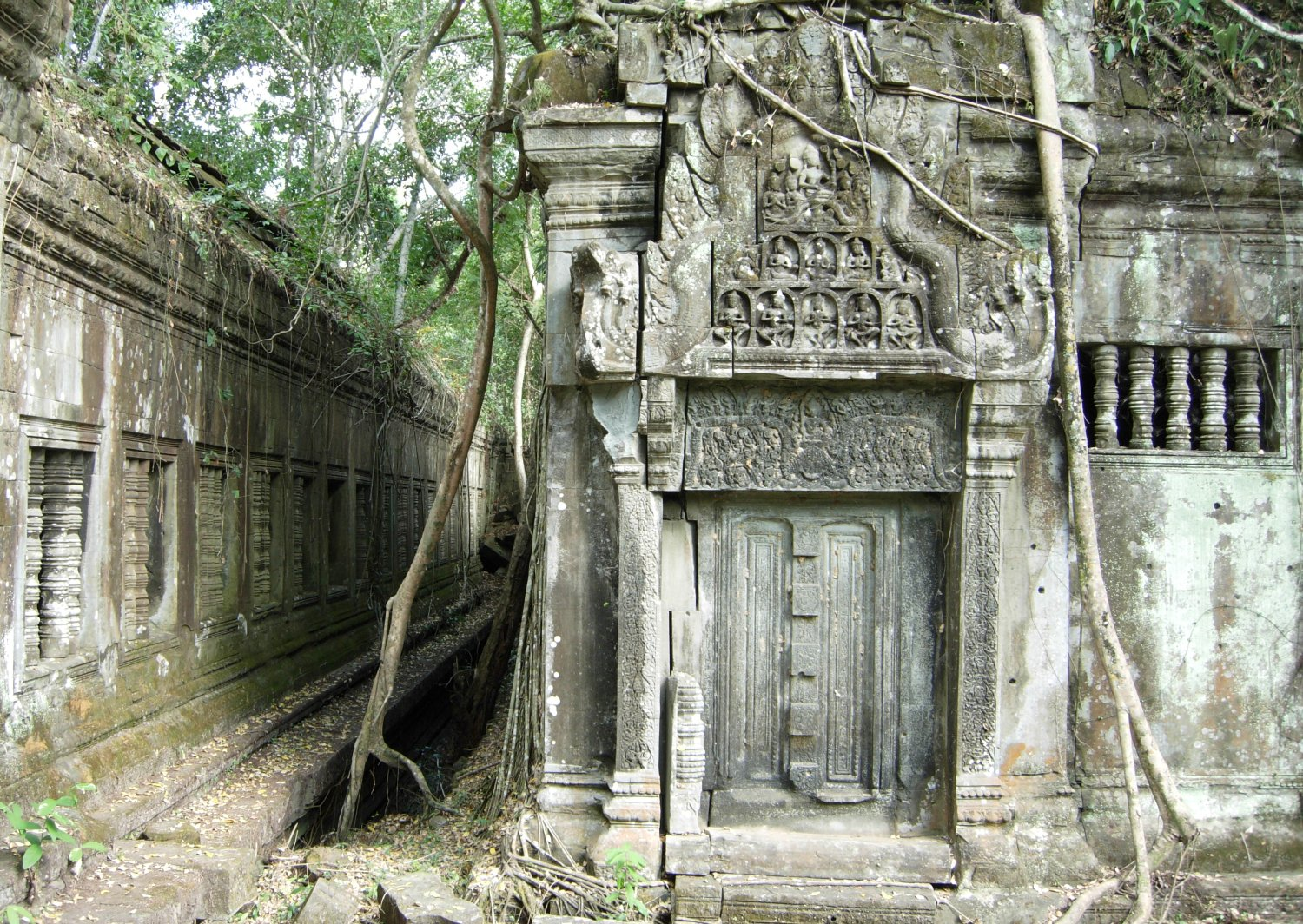
Blind door, lintel and pediment in Angkor Wat style.

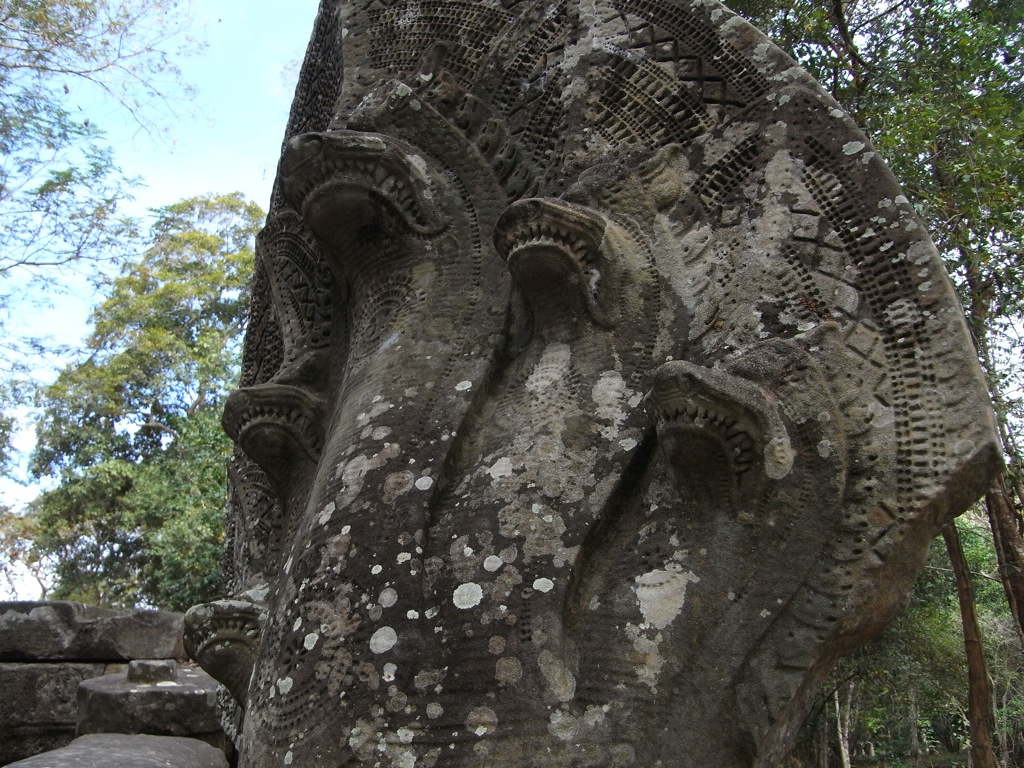
The magnificent five-headed nagas of the cruciform terraces.

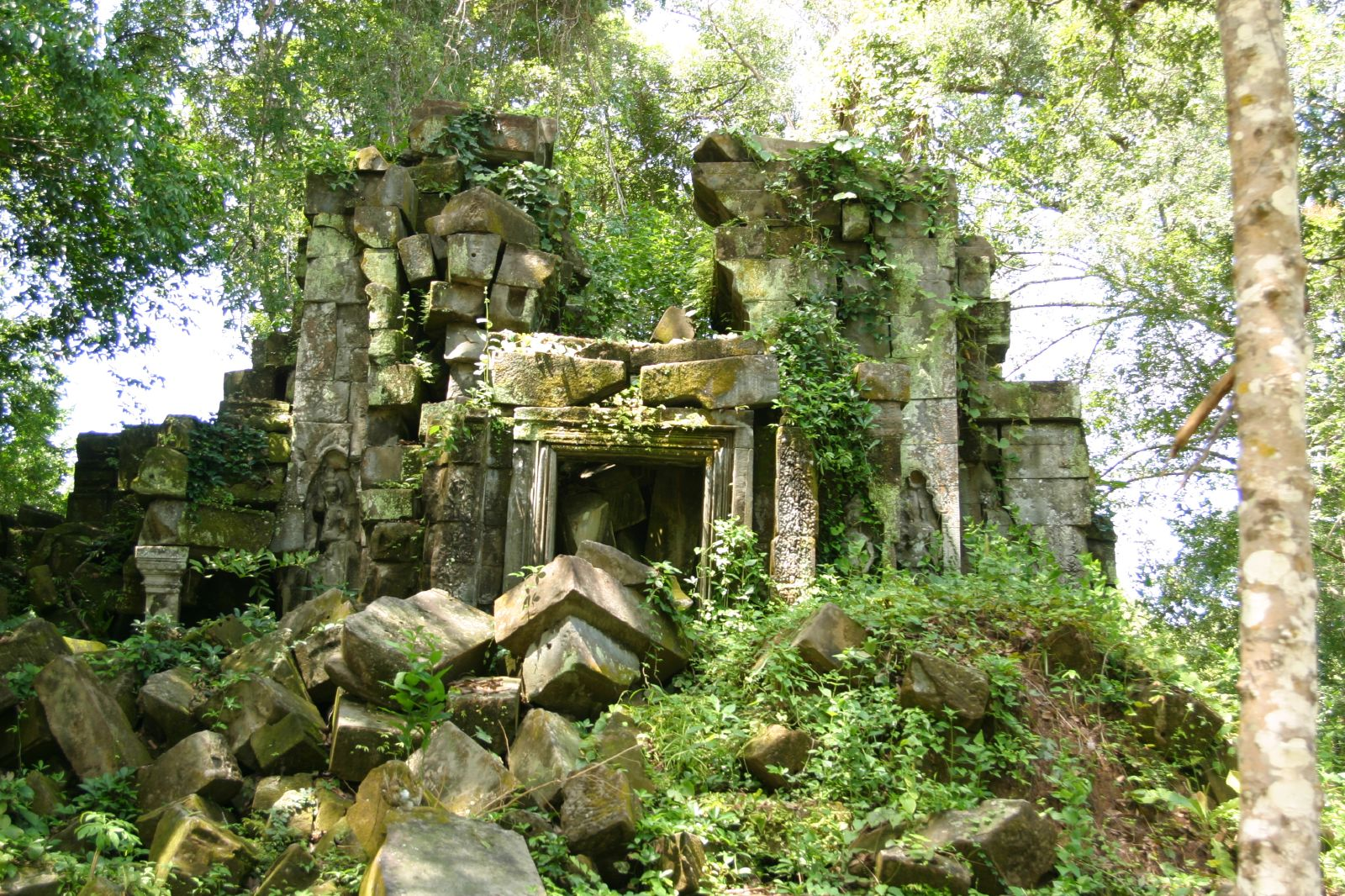
Vegetations taking over the temple.

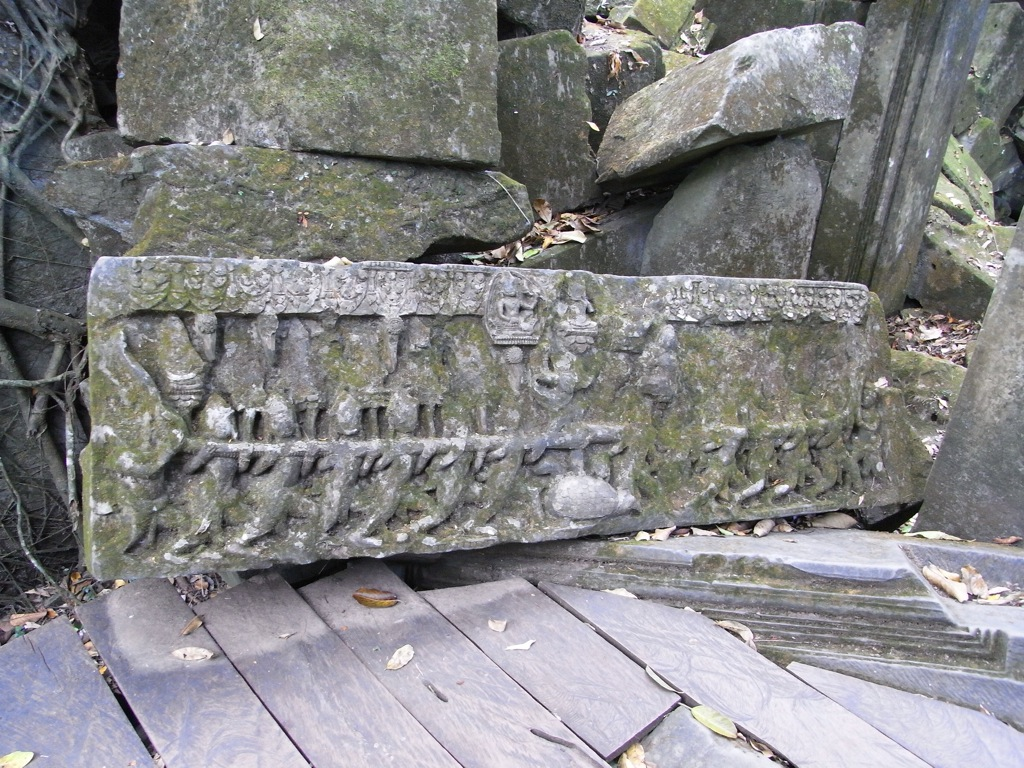
Fallen lintel showing the Churning of the Sea of Milk.

== Bibliography ==
- Freeman, Michael; Jacques, Claude (2006). Ancient Angkor. River Books. ISBN 974-8225-27-5.
- Rooney, Dawn F. (2005). Angkor: Cambodia's wondrous khmer temples (5th ed.). Odissey. ISBN 978-962-217-727-7.
