= Guy Tosatto =

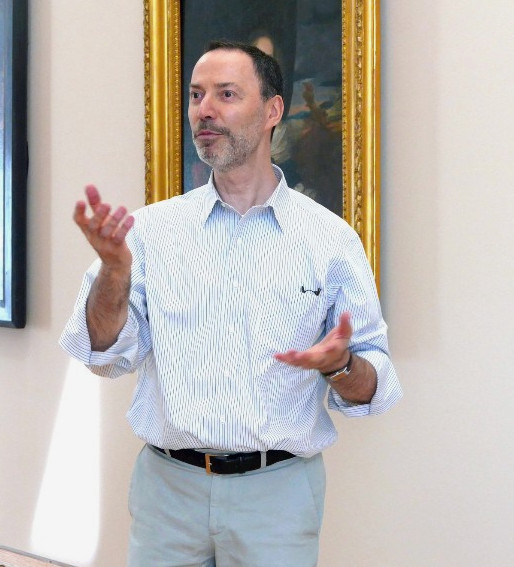
Tosatto at the musée de Grenoble in 2018.

Guy Tosatto (born 22 October 1958) is a French art historian, museum curator and museum director. Previously heading museums in Nîmes and Nantes, he was director of the musée de Grenoble from September 2002 until his retirement in 2023.

== Life ==
=== Early life ===
Born in La Tronche, he studied art history at the University of Grenoble and in Paris. He worked alongside Marie-Claude Beaud at the Fondation Cartier in Paris before in 1985 becoming the first director of the musée départemental d'Art contemporain de Rochechouart in Haute-Vienne.

=== 1990s to 2000s ===
In October 1991 he and Robert Calle became co-directors of Carré d'art in Nîmes, before Tosatto became sole director from 1993 to 2000. He also became director of musée des Beaux-Arts de Nîmes in 1997, before leaving to become director of the musée d'Arts de Nantes in January 2001.

A longtime friend of the German painte Sigmar Polke, in 1001 he and Alain Chevalier curated the exhibition « Sigmar Polke et la Révolution française » at the musée de la Révolution française in Vizille (Grenoble-Alpes Métropole). He only stayed a year in Nantes before becoming director of the musée de Grenoble.

=== Grenoble ===
He worked to open up, share and democratise the museum's collections by organising the first night-opening for students in 2004 and by finding some works in the district libraries. He also formed a friends and patrons club to raise money to buy additional works, such as one of Pablo Picasso's thirteen cubist collages in 2012 for 750,000 Euros.

Some exhibitions he organised broke visitor-number records for the museum, such as the 143,230 who came to 'Chagall et l'avant garde russe' in 2011. In late 2013 he organised another Polke exhibition, three years after that artist's death, by agreement with his widow. In November 2017 he was made a Knight of the ordre national de la Légion d'honneur, presented by Catherine Tasca, former minister of culture In October 2018, after four years' work, he opened the exhibition 'Servir les dieux d'Égypte' in order to show off the Musée de Grenoble's ancient Egyptian collection, in collaboration with the Louvre, the Bibliothèque nationale de France, the British Museum, the Champollion Museum, the Château-musée de Boulogne-sur-Mer, the Kunsthistorisches Museum, the Museum August Kestner and the Egyptian Museum of Berlin.

== Exhibitions ==
- 1986 : « Raoul Hausmann : 1886-1971 » : musée départemental d'Art contemporain de Rochechouart
- 1996 : Jean-Pierre Bertrand, Carré d'art de Nimes
- 1997 : Alan Charlton, Carré d'art de Nîmes
- 2001 : « Picasso, la peinture seule, 1961-1972 », musée d'Arts de Nantes
- 2002 : Helmut Federle, musée d'Arts de Nantes
- 2003 : Thomas Schütte, musée de Grenoble
- 2005 : « Jean Achard, Laurent Guétal, Charles Bertier: trois maîtres du paysage dauphinois au XIX siecle »
- 2006 : « Braque, Paul Klee, Léger »
- 2007 : « L'Impressionnisme de France et d'Amérique »
- 2008 : « Collection d'art africain, un patrimoine dévoilé »
- 2008 : « Wolfgang Laib Without place, Without Time, Without Body »
- 2009 : Henriette Deloras, Marc Pessin - « Un siècle d'art à Berlin : la collection de la Berlinische Galerie »
- 2009 : Patrick Faigenbaum, Richter en France, Alex Katz, Gregory Forstner, Duncan Wylie, Gaston Chaissac
- 2010 : « De chair et d'esprit, les dessins italiens du XV au XVIII siecles » - « Lire l'Impressionnisme, six tableaux six maîtres » - « Le Général de Beylié, collectionneur et mécène » - « Stephan Balkenhol »
- 2011 : « Chagall et l'avant garde russe » - « Alain Kirili »
- 2012 : « L'idée et la ligne, les dessins français du musée de Grenoble XVI au XVIII siecles » - « La rivière blanche » - « Die Brücke » - « Philippe Cognée »
- 2013 : « Alberto Giacometti »
- 2013 : « Sigmar Polke »
- 2014 : « La pointe et l'ombre, les dessins nordiques du musée de Grenoble du XVI au XVIII siecle) »
- 2014 : « Giuseppe Penone »
- 2015 : « De Picasso à Warhol, une décennie d’enrichissement des collections du musée de Grenoble »
- 2015 : « Georgia O'Keeffe et ses amis photographes »
- 2016 : « Cristina Iglesias »
- 2016 : « Kandinsky - Les années parisiennes (1933-1944) »
- 2017 : « Henri Fantin-Latour - À fleur de peau »
- 2017 : « Daniel Dezeuze - une rétrospective »
- 2018 : « De Delacroix à Gauguin, chefs-d’œuvre dessinés du XIX siecle du musée de Grenoble »
- 2018 : « Servir les dieux d'Égypte »
- 2019 : « Souvenirs de voyage. La collection d'Antoine de Galbert »
- 2019 : « Hommage au conservateur Andry-Farcy »
- 2019 : « Picasso. Au cœur des ténèbres (1939-1945) »
- 2020 : « Grenoble et ses artistes au XIX siecle »
- 2021 : « Giorgio Morandi. La collection Magnani-Rocca » - « Italia moderna, œuvres d'artistes italiens du XXe siecle du musée »

== Publications ==
- Thomas Schütte - requiem. Nimes: Carré d'art-Musée d'art contemporain. 1994. ISBN 2-907650-17-3.
- Wolfgang Laib : La chambre des certitudes (The room of certitudes). Carré d'art, musée d'art contemporain. 2001. ISBN 3-7757-9095-0.

=== Collaborations ===
- (in French) Alain Chevalier; Marcel Destot; Aleth Jourdan; Guy Tosatto (2000). Musée des beaux-arts de Nîmes. Paris: Réunion des musées nationaux. ISBN 2-7118-4096-4.
- (in French) Anne Bertrand; Isabelle Marcadé; Guy Tosatto (2001). Guide des collections : Carré d'Art musée d'art contemporain de Nîmes (in French). Paris: RMN - Carré d'Art. ISBN 2-7118-4095-6.
- (in French) Guy Tosatto (ed.), Bal Danielle (coord.) (2004). Musée de Grenoble, collections (in French). Versailles Grenoble: Artlys Musée de Grenoble. ISBN 2-85495-219-7.
- (in French) Guy Tosatto; Laurence Huault-Nesme; Hélène Vincent; Claire Moiroud (2005). Trois maîtres du paysage dauphinois au XIX siecle : Jean Achard, Laurent Guétal, Charles Bertier. Versailles: Artlys. ISBN 978-2-85495-270-4.
