= Tosatti =

Tosatti is a surname. Notable people with the surname include:

- Erio Tosatti (born 1943), Italian theoretical physicist
- Valentino Tosatti (born c. 1981), Italian mathematician
- Vieri Tosatti (1920-1999), Italian composer
