= Carré d'Art =

Carré d'art
- Established: 1993
- Location: Place de la Maison Carrée, Nîmes, Gard, France
- Coordinates: 43.838071°N 4.355414°E
- Type: Art museum, Mediathque
- Website: carreartmusee.com

The Carré d'art at Nîmes in southern France houses a museum of contemporary art and the city's municipal library. Constructed of glass, concrete and steel, it faces the Maison carrée, a perfectly preserved Roman temple that dates from the very beginning of the 1st century AD. In 1984, twelve architects, including Frank Gehry, Jean Nouvel and César Pelli, were invited to submit proposals for the museum. A design by the British architect Norman Foster was selected, and the building was opened in May 1993.

The building was constructed as part of a project to refurbish the square in which the Maison carrée stands, and provides a new setting for the ancient temple. The building is a nine-storey structure, half of which is sunk deep into the ground, keeping the building's profile low in sympathy with the scale of the surrounding buildings. The lower levels house archival storage and a cinema.

== Gallery ==
Exterior view of Carré d'Art

Interior view of Carré d'Art

== See also ==
- List of libraries in France
