= Léon de Beylié =

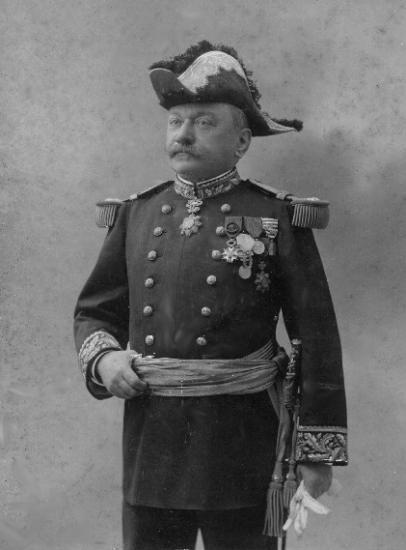
Léon de Beylié in 1902, anonymous photographer, musée de Grenoble.

Léon Marie Eugène de Beylié (26 November 1849 – 15 July 1910) was a French général de brigade, archaeologist and patron of the arts.

His military career was mainly in French Indochina, where he was accidentally killed in a shipwreck during his sixth military campaign. He is also notable for the paintings and objets d'art he gave and bequeathed to the musée de Grenoble.

== Life ==
=== Parentage ===
His father Joseph came from an old Dauphinois family which included the famous doctors Jean (1671–1727), army surgeon, and Jacques (1696–1764), physician in ordinary to the king at Grenoble. It was ennobled in 1788 thanks to Léon's great-grandfather Philibert-Augustin de Beylié (1730–1797), who had a military career in France's colonies before being elected the representative of Pondichery and the East Indies in the 1789 Constituent Assembly. His brother Claude was also a general.

Joseph entered the école de Saint-Cyr in 1832 then the cavalry school in Saumur in 1835. A lieutenant in a dragoon regiment, he resigned in 1842 after his marriage in Alsace to Aimée du Moulin, daughter of general Charles du Moulin, comte d'Empire and governor of Strasbourg, and of the Bavarian countess Catherine-Eugénie von Eckart. Passionate about art history, he was also an amateur painter and sculptor.

=== Youth ===
Born in Strasbourg, Léon spent his early years in his maternal grandmother's castle in Bavaria and in Alsace. In 1856 his family then settled in Paris, where Léon went to primary school at the Jesuit college of the Immaculate Conception, before moving to Dauphiné. The young boy studied in Villefranche-sur-Saône at the Jesuit lycée of Notre-Dame de Mongré. He graduated as a bachelor of letters in 1867, he spent the following year on a baccalauréat in elementary mathematics at Grenoble's lycée impérial. Educated in Grenoble, amid an aristocratic milieu, his father introduced him to the arts at the musée de Grenoble, then still in the former Jesuit college, and his pianist mother to music and literature.

On 16 October 1869, aged 19, he entered the military school of Saint-Cyr, but nine months later the Franco-Prussian War, in which he fought from 14 August as a sous-lieutenant in the 4th Line Infantry Regiment and was badly wounded in August at the battle of Montmédy. His father Joseph also volunteered for the fighting, and one of his two brothers, Charles, died in the conflict. Léon was decorated and mon 3 November 1870 made a knight of the Légion d'honneur before returning to Saint-Cyr to complete his training. He graduated with a diploma and was classed forty-seventh out of 176 students in his class.

On 3 March 1873 he was made lieutenant in the 42nd Line Infantry Regiment, serving as ordnance officer to Joseph Faron, and his senior officers stated him to be small (1.6 m tall), robust and good at campaigning. In 1876 he was sent to Paris to study at the staff college, which he graduated as a brevet état-major thirtieth out of 68 students. On returning to his regiment at Belfort, he was seconded to the divisional staff at Besançon to complete his training. On 16 December he was promoted to captain and posted to the 124th Line Infantry Regiment at Dreux. He left the 13th Army Corps on 24 December 1880 for 15th Army Corps at Clermont-Ferrand, a year after his father's death aged 67 .

In spring 1882 he took two months' leave staying at several towns in Italy viewing cultural sites and art and buying various objects (often from the Middle and Far East), trinkets often without value. The following year he asked for a transfer to the marines, a more and more coveted posting for officers at that time, but only gained one on 1 July 1884. With the agreement of his senior officers, he began his first major voyage outside of Europe on 1 July 1884. This involved a total of five weeks in several Indian towns and cities, allowing him to publish his first brochure on a country and to collect punch daggers. After a brief stay in Brest he was sent to French Indochina in the 2nd Regiment.

=== First campaign - Tonkin (1884) ===
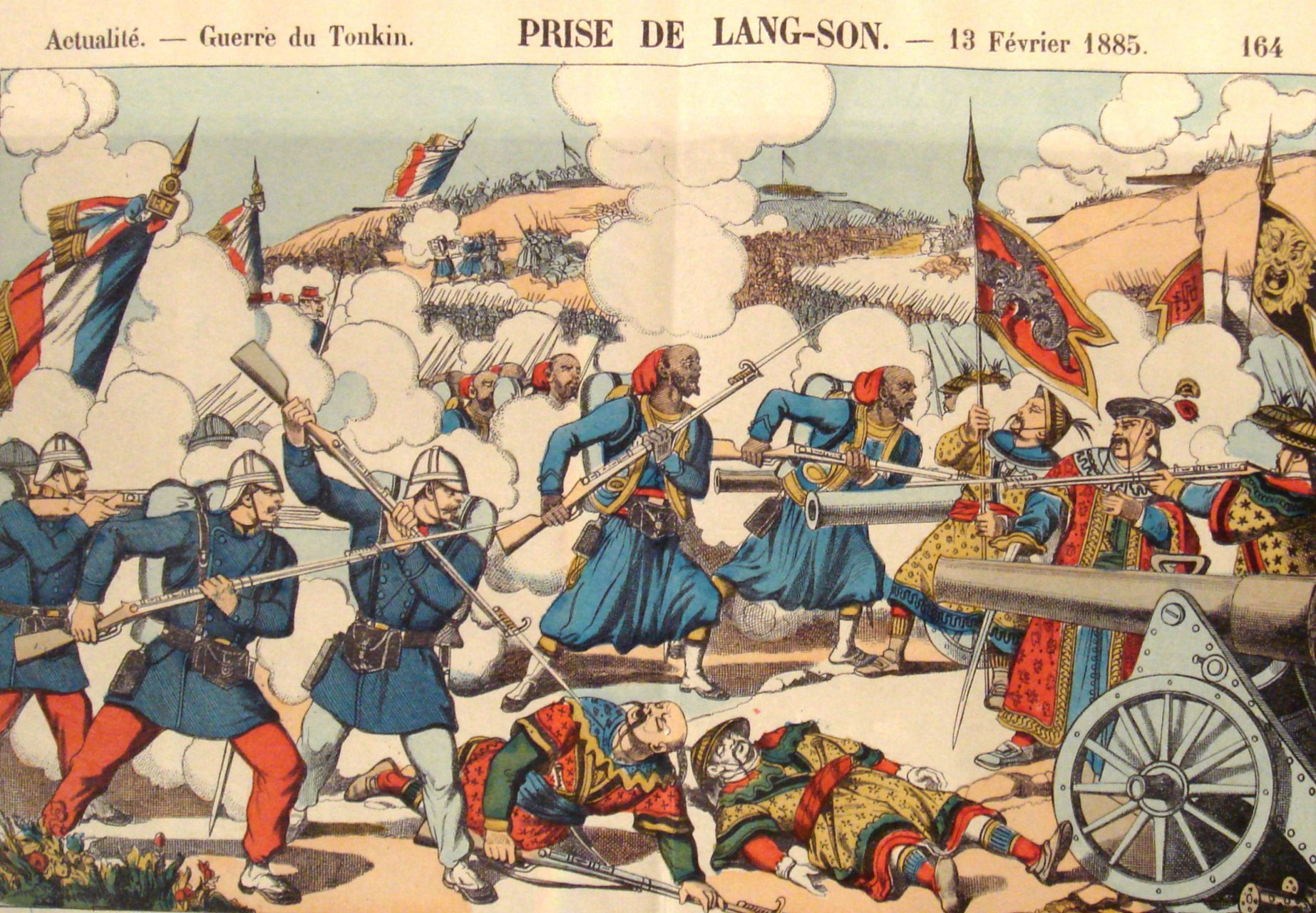
The French capture of Lang Son par les Français in 1885.

=== Second campaign - Tonkin (1890) ===
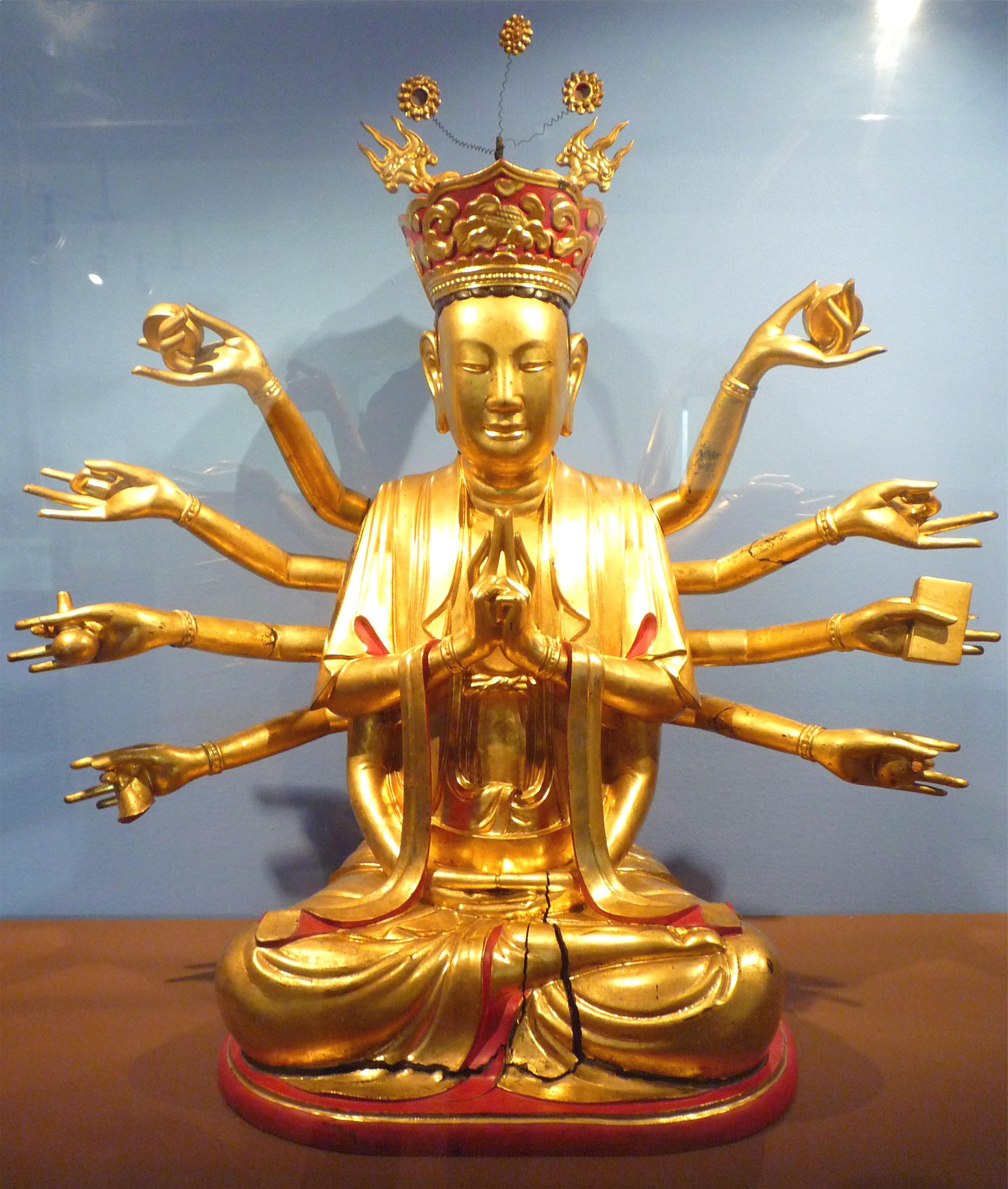
The 12-armed goddess Quan Thé Am, given by him to the musée de Grenoble in 1890.

=== Fourth campaign - Tonkin (1898) ===
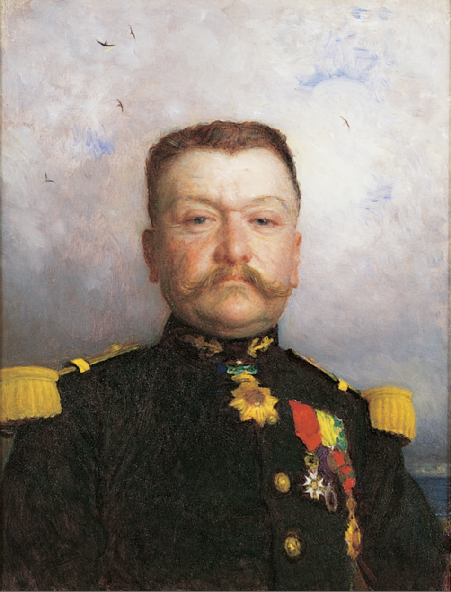
Ernest Hébert, Portrait of colonel Léon de Beylié (1898), musée de Grenoble.

== Travel accounts ==
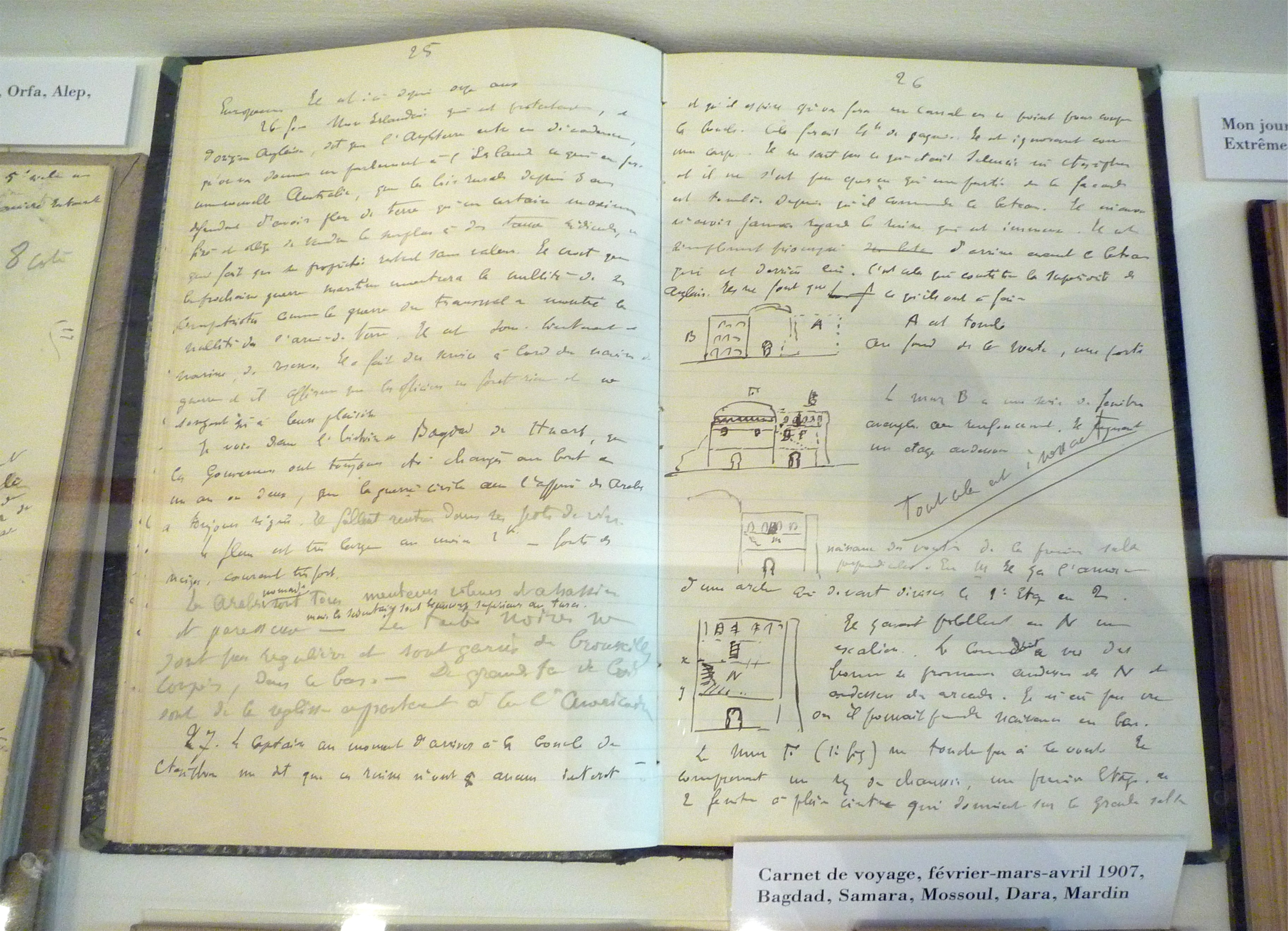
1907 Iraqi manuscripts, Museum of Grenoble.

== Works ==
- Léon de Beylié, Le musée de Grenoble, Paris, Éditeur librairie Renouard, H. Laurens, 1909.

== Legacy ==
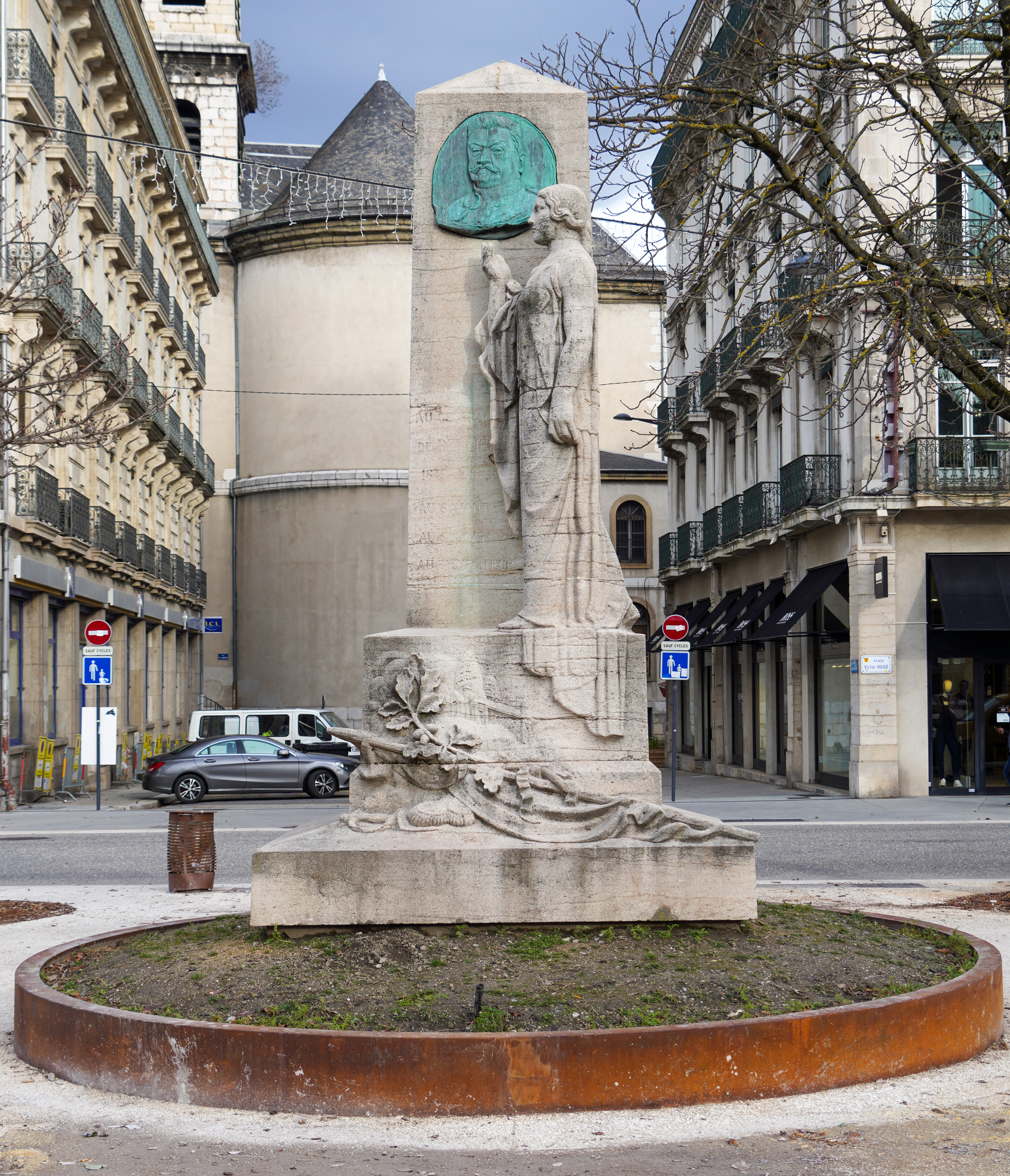
His monument at place Victor-Hugo.

On 2 April 2012, as part of a set of conferences on "The Orient in arts and arms", the musée de l'Armée organised one at the hôtel des Invalides in Paris entitled "The Far East : General de Beylié and the Rediscovery of Angkor", chaired by Jean-François Klein, maître de conférences at the Institut national des langues et civilisations orientales.

== Namesakes ==
- Rue Général-de-Beylié, à Grenoble (Isère).

== Bibliography ==
- (in French) Danielle Bal, Jean-François Klein, Roland Mourer, Caroline Herbelin, Le Général de Beylié 1849-1910. Collectionneur et mécène, Paris, Éditeur Milan 5 Continents ISBN 978-88-7439-563-7.
- (in French) Catherine Chevillot (1995). Peintures et sculptures du 19e siècle. Paris: réunion des musées nationaux. ISBN 9782711829644..
- (in French) H. Falque and Félix Perrin, Une fête au musée de Grenoble, Grenoble, Librairie dauphinoise, 1900.
- (in French) Paul Dreyfus, Les rues de Grenoble, Grenoble, Éditeur Glénat, 1992.
