= Timeline of Champa =

This is a timeline of the history of the Kingdom of Champa and its people–the Cham–an Austronesian-speaking ethnic group in Southeast Asia.

== Neolithic ==
Year	Date	Event
1000 BC		Austronesian Chamic people migrated to Hue, Central Vietnam coast and forged a metal-age culture in Sa Huỳnh.

== Chinese rule ==
Year	Date	Event
111 BC		Han conquest of Nanyue
AD 100		People of Xianglin county revolted against the Chinese Han dynasty and destroyed Han administration buildings.
136		Xianglin inhabitants revolted against the Han dynasty.
144		Xianglin revolt spread to the Red River Delta and was suppressed.
192		Cham leader Khu Liên led a successful revolt against the Chinese Han dynasty. Khu Liên found the kingdom of Lâm Ấp, allegedly the first Cham state.

== From 3rd to 15th centuries ==
=== 3rd century ===
Year	Date	Event
220		Phạm Hùng became King of Lâm Ấp.
248		Lâm Ấp attacked Jiaozhou and provoked a rebellion in Jiuzhen.
270		Phạm Hùng raided Jiaozhou with aid from king of Funan Fan Hsün.
284		Phạm Dật became king of Lâm Ấp and sent the first mission to Imperial China.
286		Kingdom of Quduqian sent an envoy to the Jin dynasty

=== 4th century ===
Year	Date	Event
336		The chief minister of Phạm Dật, Phạm Văn (Fan Wen) became king. Phạm Văn was a Chinese man who was being sold as a slave to Champa when he was a child.
340		Phạm Văn pacified barbarian tribes and sent a mission to Imperial China.
347		Phạm Văn seized part of Rinan south of the Hoành Sơn mountain.
349		Phạm Phật (Fan Fo) succeeds his father Phạm Văn, who died in early that year.
351–359		Phạm Phật launched several incursions on the Chinese province of Jiaozhou.
372		Phạm Phật sent mission to China.
380		Phạm Phật was succeeded by his son Phạm Hồ Đạt (Fan Huda), who was supposedly Bhadravarman I.
399		Fan Huda launched an invasion of Rinan, but was driven back by the Chinese governor Du Yian.

=== 5th century ===
Year	Date	Event
405		Cham raided Rinan.
413		Fan Huda launched another invasion on Rinan, but was defeated and beheaded by Du Xuedu.
413		Gangaraja pilgrimed to the Ganges River, India.
420		The new king of Lâm Ấp, Phạm Dương Mại I attacked the Jin dynasty, but suffered a defeat. Half of Lâm Ấp's population was massacred.
431		Phạm Dương Mại II attacked Jiaozhou but was driven back.
432		Phạm Dương Mại II requested the Liu Song court for the chairman of the Prefect of Jiao.
446	May	Liu Song dynasty invaded Lâm Ấp, besieged the Cham capital of Kandarapura, sacked the city, killed the Cham king, and looted 100,000 pounds of gold.
456		Son of Phạm Dương Mại II, Fan Chen-ch'eng, sent embassy to China.
late 5th century		Lâm Ấp's economy flourished.
~ 480		The throne of Lam Ap was usurped by a man named Fan Dānggēnchún/Jiū Chóuluó with help of rebels. Fan Dānggēnchún received support from the Chinese.
484		King of Funan Jayavarman Kaundinya requested the Chinese Qi empire to launch a punitive expedition against Linyi.

=== 6th century ===
Year	Date	Event
529		Bicuibamo died. A descendant of Gangaraja named Rudravarman became king.
530		Rudravarman sent mission to the Liang dynasty.
541		Rudravarman attacked the Jiǔdé/Cửu Đức province (today Hà Tĩnh).
544		Pham Tu, a general of Ly Bon, defeated Rudravarman.
572		Rudravarman died. Sambhuvarman became king of Lâm Ấp.
595		Sambhuvarman sent an embassy to the emperor of new unified Sui China.

=== 7th century ===
Year	Date	Event
600		Sambhuvarman constructed the Bhadresvara temple of Mỹ Sơn and a new sanctuary called Sambhubhadresvara.
605		Sino–Cham war: Chinese general Liu Fang invaded Lâm Ấp and overcame Sambhuvarman's army; Cham capital Simhapura was sacked; Lâm Ấp was briefly occupied into three Chinese counties; Liu Fang died of disease during withdraw.
623		Sambhuvarman reasserted Cham independence and sent a mission to the new Tang Empire.
629		Sambhuvarman died and was succeeded by his son Kandarpadharma. Since then, Chams have used Champa to refer to their state.
631		Kandarpadharma sent missions to the Tang.
640		Prabhasadharma became king of Champa and sent mission to the Tang.
645		Prabhasadharma was assassinated by his minister.
646		Prince Bhadreśvaravarman fled to Cambodia while the throne was occupied by a minister.
650		A sister of Prabhasadharma, princess (Daughter of Kandarpadharma) became ruler of Champa.
653		Prakasadharma, a son of a Cham prince named Jagaddharma (grandson of Kandarpadharma) and Khmer princess Sarväni (daughter of Isanavarman I of Chenla), ascended the throne of Champa as Vikrantavarman I.
658–669		Cham territories expanded to the south.
667		Cham envoy to Cambodia.
686		Vikrantavarman II became king of Champa.

=== 8th century ===
Year	Date	Event
722		Champa and Chenla assisted Mai Thúc Loan's rebellion against the Tang Empire.
740		The Simhapura dynasty interrupted and vanished with no available explanation.
749		The last Lâm Ấp envoy to the Tang Empire.
757		Prithindravarman became king of Champa.
770		Satyavarman became king of Champa.
774		Javanese raiders pillaged and destroyed the Po Nagar temple in Nha Trang.
784		Satyavarman restored and rebuilt the temple.
787		Satyavarman's younger brother, Indravarman, became king of Champa. Javanese raiders destroyed Bhadrädhipatisvara Temple in Phan Rang.
793		Indravarman sent a mission to China.
799		Indravarman driven off the Javanese and restored the temple of Bhadrädhipatisvara.

=== 9th century ===
Year	Date	Event
802		Harivarman I became king of Champa.
803		Harivarman I attacked the Chinese protectorate of Annan.
804		The Senäpati Par launched incursion on Khmer Empire.
818		Vikrantavarman III succeeded Harivarman I.
875		Indravarman II became the king of kings and relocated the capital to Indrapura. Mahayana Buddhism was evaluated as the state religion; Indravarman built the great Buddhist complex of Lakshmindralokesvara in Đồng Dương.
889		Khmer ruler Yasovarman I led an invasion of Champa, but was repelled by Indravarman II.
890		Indravarman II died and was succeeded by his nephew Jaya Simhavarman I.

=== 10th century ===
Year	Date	Event
904		Saktivarman, son of Simhavarman, became king of Champa.
905		Prince Bhadravarman II became king of Champa.
918		Bhadravarman's son Indravarman III became king of Champa.
950		Khmer–Cham wars: Indravarman III defeated a Khmer invasion of Nha Trang.
958		Indravarman III's envoy Abu'l Hassan brought petrol bombs from Champa to the Chinese Later Zhou court as tribute.
960		Jaya Indravarman I became king of Champa.
965		Jaya Indravarman I restored the temple of Po Nagar which previously plundered by the Khmer.
967		Ngô Nhật Khánh, a Vietnamese prince and grandson of Ngô Quyền, fled to Champa.
971		An Arab named Ali Nur became the deputy king of Champa.
972		Paramesvaravarman I became king of Champa and kept a close relationship with the Song dynasty
979		Paramesvaravarman I and Ngô Nhật Khánh led a fleet to attack Dai Viet after its king Dinh Bo Linh was assassinated. The invasion however was stopped by a typhoon; Ngô Nhật Khánh was drowned and abandoned.
980		The new Viet ruler, Le Hoan, sent embassy to Champa to establish relationship. However, Paramesvaravarman arrested the envoys.
982		Cham–Vietnamese War (982): Le Hoan launched a naval invasion that killed Paramesvaravarman and destroyed much of the capital Indrapura then withdrew.
983		A Viet official in the Cham government name Lưu Kế Tông seized the power in Indrapura and successfully resisted Le Hoan's attempt to remove him.
986		Indravarman IV died. Lưu Kế Tông proclaimed as king of Champa and sent a mission to China to seek international recognition. Thousands of Cham and Muslims fled the country.
988		The Cham populace protested against Lưu Kế Tông by enthroning a Cham native in Vijaya.
989		Lưu Kế Tông died and the Cham leader in Vijaya was known as Harivarman II, the seventh dynasty of Champa began.
999		Harivarman II's reign ended.

=== 11th century ===
Year	Date	Event
1007		Harivarman III became king of Champa
1008		Civil war broke out in Champa, Harivarman III defeated the rebels.
1018		An unknown king ruling the kingdom
1020		Cham army clashed with Vietnamese prince Lý Phật Mã in modern-day northern Quảng Bình Province.
1030		Vikrantavarman IV allegedly became king of Champa
1041		Vikrantavarman IV's son Simhavarman II was enthroned.
1042		Simhavarman II sent a mission to China to request investiture.
1043		Simhavarman II raided the coast of Dai Viet.
1044		Lý Thái Tông led a sea attack on the Cham city of Kandarapura. Simhavarman II resisted the invaders but was slain. The Vietnamese then plundered the Cham capital Vijaya and took away the royal family and national treasures.
1050		The new Cham king Jaya Paramesvaravarman I sent his nephew Mahäsenäpati to suppress a revolt in Pänduranga. To satisfy the southern populace, Paramesvaravarman restored the Po Nagar temple and provided them slaves from Cambodia, China, Burma, and Siam.
1060		Bhadravarman III became king of Champa.
1061		Rudravarman III became king of Champa.
1062		Rudravarman III sent a mission to the Song court.
1068		Rudravarman III sent a mission led by Abu Mahmud to the Song court; Rudravarman III attacked Dai Viet; Lý Thánh Tông responded by launching a new seaborne campaign on Champa.
1069	Spring	Vietnamese raiders led by Lý Thánh Tông besieged Vijaya and ransacked the city; Chế Củ (supposedly Rudravarman) fled to Cambodia.
1069	April	Chế Củ was taken as a prisoner in Cambodian territory. After exchanging for three northern provinces to the Viets, the Cham king was spared.
1069–1074		Civil war exploding in Champa; Rudravarman III was deposed by rebels; more than ten warlords proclaimed themselves king of Champa.
1074		Prince Thäng destroyed all opposite factions, becoming king Harivarman IV and found the Harivarmanid dynasty.
1075		Harivarman IV repulsed a Vietnamese raid.
1077		Harivarman IV made peace with Dai Viet.
1080		Khmer–Cham wars: The Khmers attacked Champa, but was repelled. Harivarman IV restored numerous temples while organizing raids penetrating Cambodia as far as Sambor and the Mekong. Nine-year-old Prince Vak was crowned as Jaya Indravarman II.
1081		Jaya Indravarman II's uncle Pang became Paramabhodhisatva.
1086		Paramabhodhisatva was overthrown by Jaya Indravarman II.

=== 12th century ===
Year	Date	Event
1103		A Vietnamese encouraged Indravarman II to retake three northern provinces. The campaign went successful at first, however, Indravarman II was able to hold them in several months.
1114		Harivarman V became king of Champa.
1132		Khmer–Vietnamese war (1123–1150): Khmer Empire and Champa launched naval attack on Dai Viet, briefly seized Nghe An, pillaged the coastal of Thanh Hoa.
1139		Khmer–Cham wars: An adopted son of Harivarman V became king Jaya Indravarman III. He refused to cooperate with the Khmers.
1145		Khmer–Cham wars: Suryavarman II invaded and annexed Champa. Rudravarman IV from Pänduranga became the puppet monarch of the Khmers, but then fled.
1147		Khmer–Cham wars: Prince Sivänandana, son of Rudravarman IV, returned to Champa and proclaimed king of Champa. He took the reign name Jaya Harivarman I.
1148		Khmer–Cham wars: Jaya Harivarman I inflicted a defeat on Khmer force.
1149		Khmer–Cham wars: Jaya Harivarman I and the Chams retook the capital Vijaya from the Khmer.
1150		Jaya Harivarman I's brother-in-law Vamsaräja rebelled against him. Vamsaräja mobilized 5,000 Vietnamese troops and attacked Harivarman in Quang Nam, but were defeated.
1151		Jaya Harivarman I recaptured Amarävati.
1160		Jaya Harivarman I recaptured Pänduranga from rebels.
1166		Jaya Harivarman II became king of Champa.
1167		Jaya Indravarman IV became king of Champa, and sent a mission to Southern Sung court.
1170		Jaya Indravarman IV made peace with Dai Viet
1177		Khmer–Cham wars: Jaya Indravarman IV led a surprising invasion of Angkor through the Mekong. Cham forces defeated the Khmer forces at Battle of Tonlé Sap and killed Khmer ruler Tribhuvanāditya. Angkor was sacked.
1181		Khmer–Cham wars: Jayavarman VII of Cambodia liberated the country and ousted the Cham invaders.
1190		Khmer–Cham wars: Jayavarman VII invaded Champa and made it a vassal with Vidyanandana as client king.
1191		Khmer–Cham wars: Cham revolted against Khmer rule. The northern king Jaya Indravarman oṅ Vatuv hailed from Quang Binh and drove the Khmer out of Vijaya.
1193		Khmer–Cham wars: Vidyanandana defeated Jaya Indravarman oṅ Vatuv, then declared himself Suryavarman of independent Champa.
1193, 1195, 1198–1199, 1201-1203		Khmer–Cham wars: Jayavarman VII invaded Champa but met fierce resistance from Suryavarman.

=== 13th century ===
Year	Date	Event
1203		Khmer–Cham wars: Jayavarman VII finally defeated the Chams, sent Vidyanandana to exile and turned Champa into a Khmer province.
1220		Khmer rule of Champa ended voluntarily. Jaya Paramesvaravarman II became king of independent Champa.
1252		The new king of Dai Viet, Tran Thai Tong attacked Champa and took Queen Bo-da-la and Cham concubines as prisoners.
1254		Jaya Indravarman VI became king of Champa.
1257		Indravarman VI was assassinated by his nephew Indravarman V, who would become king of Champa.
1278		Indravarman V was asked to be present in the court of Kublai's Yuan Empire, but he refused.
1282	December	Kublai sent Sogetu leading the invasion of Champa.
1283	February	Mongol invasion of Champa: Yuan fleet anchored the coast of Champa.
1283	13 February	Battle of Thị Nại Bay: Yuan army defeated Cham army.
1283	17 February	Mongol invasion of Champa: Yuan forces captured Vijaya; Indravarman V and Prince Harijit withdrew to highlands, the Chams waged guerrilla resistance against the Yuan occupation.
1283	16 March	Mongol invasion of Champa: Cham forces ambushed and inflicted heavy casualties on the Yuan.
1284	March	Mongol invasion of Champa: Yuan reinforcements led by Ataqai and Ariq Qaya arrived Champa to assist Sogetu.
1285	February	Second Mongol invasion of Dai Viet: The Mongols advanced to the north to campaign against the Vietnamese; Champa launched counteroffensives.
1285	24 June	Battle of Chương Dương: Cham–Vietnamese forces defeated the Yuan at Chương Dương port; Sogetu was killed in battle and decapitated; destruction of the Yuan army.
1285	6 October	Indravarman V sent an ambassador to Kublai and then died afterward.
1288		Prince Harijit became king Jaya Simhavarman III of Champa.

=== 14th century ===
Year	Date	Event
1306		Simhavarman III married with Vietnamese queen Paramesvari, king Trần Anh Tông's younger sister as he ceded two provinces O and Ly to Dai Viet. He built Po Klaung Gara temple in Phan Rang and Yang Prong Tower in Dak Lak.
1307	May	Simhavarman III died, but Paramesvari refused to die with him. Jaya Simhavarman IV became king of Champa.
1312		Simhavarman IV set out to recapture the two provinces but failed. Trần Anh Tông sent army and took Simhavarman IV as a prisoner to Tonkin where he died in next year. His brother Chế Năng became Dai Viet vassal king.
1313		Siamese raiders from Sukhothai Kingdom attacked Champa but were fend off by Dai Viet.
1314		Chế Năng rebelled against Trần Anh Tông.
1318		Chế Năng was defeated and then took refuge in Java. The Vietnamese placed a man named Jaya Ananda as client king of Champa.
1326		Ananda regained independence of Champa from the Vietnamese. Odoric of Pordenone visited Champa.
1342		Ananda died and his brother-in-law Maha Sawa became king while legitimate crown prince Che Mo went to Dai Viet to seek help, but failed.
1345		Ibn Battuta visited Champa.
1360		Po Binasuor (Chế Bồng Nga) became king of Champa. He reunited the Chams and strengthened the kingdom.
1368		Cham–Vietnamese War (1367–1390): Cham troops defeated a Vietnamese army in modern-day Quang Nam.
1369		The emperor of China recognised Po Binasuor as king of Champa.
1371		Cham–Vietnamese War (1367–1390): Po Binasuor led a naval invasion that sacked Hanoi.
1377	Spring	Battle of Vijaya: Po Binasuor defeated and killed king Trần Duệ Tông in Vijaya.
1377	Winter	Cham–Vietnamese War (1367–1390): Cham forces sacked Hanoi second time.
1378		Cham–Vietnamese War (1367–1390): Cham forces sacked Hanoi third time.
1383	Summer	Cham–Vietnamese War (1367–1390): Po Binasuor launched a mountain offensive that routed the Vietnamese forces.
1383	Autumn	Cham–Vietnamese War (1367–1390): Cham troops ransacked Hanoi fourth time.
1389		Cham–Vietnamese War (1367–1390): Cham army advanced to the Red River Delta.
1390	February	Cham–Vietnamese War (1367–1390): Po Binasuor and the Cham army were surrounded and defeated on Hải Triều River; ended the Cham–Vietnamese war.
1390		Po Binasuor's general La Khai withdrew the Cham remnant to Vijaya and abandoned most of Po Binasuor's reconquered territories; La Khai became king Simhavarman VI of Champa.
1400		Simhavarman VI died, his son Ngauk Klaung Vijaya became king Virabhadravarman of Champa.

=== 15th century ===
Year	Date	Event
1402		The new king of Dai Viet, Hồ Hán Thương made war with Champa and forced Virabhadravarman to ceded Amaravati to Dai Viet.
1403		Hồ Hán Thương besieged Vijaya (Vietnamese chronicles) /or raided the Cham countryside (Ming Shilu).
1407		Ming Empire conquered Dai Viet. The province of Amaravati was returned to Champa.
1409		Virabhadravarman-Indravarman VI established the city of Samṛddhipurī.
1421		Virabhadravarman-Indravarman VI annexed the eastern half of the Mekong Delta.
1428		Virabhadravarman reestablished peaceful relations with the Vietnamese ruler Le Loi.
1432		Virabhadravarman changed his name to Indravarman VI.
1441		Indravarman VI died; one of his nephews, prince Śrīndra-Viṣṇukīrti Virabhadravarman, ascended the throne; succession troubles led to civil war.
1445	Winter	The regents of Dai Viet attacked Champa and installed prince Maha Kali as a puppet king.
1449		Maha Kali was murdered by his elder brother Maha Kaya.
1458		Maha Saya became king of Champa.
1460		Maha Sajan became king of Champa.
1470	November	Cham–Vietnamese War (1471): Maha Sajan commanded 100,000 troops and attacked Vietnamese garrisons at Huế, former Cham land.
1471	February 18	Cham–Vietnamese War (1471): Vietnamese forces led by king Lê Thánh Tông laid siege of Vijaya.
1471	22 February	Cham–Vietnamese War (1471): Vijaya fell; king Maha Sajan, Cham royal family, a fendedan and 30,000 people were taken as prisoners and deported to the north.
1471	1 March	A Cham general named Jayavarman Mafoungnan fled to Phan Rang; Cham refugees escaped to Cambodia, Malaysia and Indonesia en masse.
1471	7 March	Jayavarman Mafoungnan submitted to Thánh Tông; ending the independent Kingdom of Champa.

== Panduranga–Trấn Thuận Thành ==
=== 16th century ===
Year	Date	Event
1509		Thousands of Cham slaves in Hanoi were massacred by king Lê Uy Mục.
1526		Cham rump state Panduranga stopped paying tribute to Dai Viet court.
1543		The last diplomatic relation between China and Champa.
1578		Panduranga attacked Nguyen Hoang's territories.
1585		Champa became a Muslim nation, according to Spanish report.
1594		Panduranga sent troops to aid Johor Sultanate fight against the Portuguese.

=== 17th century ===
Year	Date	Event
1611		Panduranga attacked the Vietnamese in Phu Yen, but was beaten by lord Nguyen Phuc Nguyen. Kauthara became Vietnamese territories.
1627		Po Rome–the first Cham mountain sovereign. Po Rome opened for trade with the Dutch.
1653		Po Nraup raided Phu Yen. Lord Nguyễn Phúc Tần launched a counterattack and captured Po Nraup.
1692		Lord Nguyễn Phúc Chu invaded Panduranga, created Bình Thuận district within Panduranga made it free land for ethnic Vietnamese.
1693	December	Chams revolted against Vietnamese rule.
1697		Nguyễn Phúc Chu decided to abolish the Bình Thuận district, granting Cham ruler autonomy and set up the so-called Principality of Thuận Thành while encouraging Viet settler colonialism.

=== 18th century ===
Year	Date	Event
1700		Thousands of Cham Muslim refugees took asylum in tolerant Principality of Hà Tiên.
1712		Cham–Nguyen treaty of vassalage signed. Nguyen military outposts were set up in Panduranga.
1728		Cham revolted against the Nguyen.
1746		Cham revolted against the Nguyen.
1750		First Cham settlement in lower Mekong established by lord Nguyễn Phúc Khoát.
1775		Chams joined the Tayson rebellion against Nguyen lord.
1794		Nguyen loyalists recaptured Panduranga; pro-Tayson Cham ruler Po Tisuntiraidapuran was executed and replaced with pro-Nguyen ruler Po Ladhuanpuguh.
1795		Cham anti-Nguyen revolt.
1799		Nguyen Anh installed pro-Nguyen Po Saong Nyung Ceng as ruler of Panduranga.

=== 19th century ===
Year	Date	Event
1822–1823		Cham leader Ja Lidong revolted against Vietnamese rule.
1826		Anti-Viet Nduai Kabait rebellion was brutally suppressed.
1829		Governor Lê Văn Duyệt approved Po Thak The as king of Champa.
1832	August	Minh Mang of Vietnam annexed Panduranga and abolished the Cham monarchy.
1833		Katip Sumat uprising: Cham religious teacher Sumat declared a jihad against Minh Mang. Minh Mang was complete mesmerized and ordered a reign of terror over the Cham and indigenous highlanders in Panduranga.
1834		Ja Thak Wa uprising: Cham revolted against Minh Mang, calling for independence. Both movements were bloody suppressed.
1835		The last king of Champa, Po Phaok The, was executed. The last vestiges of Champa and the Cham civilization were annihilated.

== Bibliography ==
- Aymonier, Etienne (1893). The History of Tchampa (the Cyamba of Marco Polo, Now Annam Or Cochin-China). Oriental University Institute. ISBN 978-1-149-97414-8.
- Coedès, George (1975), Vella, Walter F. (ed.), The Indianized States of Southeast Asia, University of Hawaii Press, ISBN 978-0-824-80368-1
- Hall, Daniel George Edward (1981), History of South East Asia, Macmillan Education, Limited, ISBN 978-1-349-16521-6
- Kiernan, Ben (2019). Việt Nam: a history from earliest time to the present. Oxford University Press. ISBN 978-0-190-05379-6.
- Miksic, John Norman; Yian, Goh Geok (2016). Ancient Southeast Asia. Routledge. ISBN 978-0415735544.
- Po, Dharma (2013). Le Panduranga (Campa). Ses rapports avec le Vietnam (1802-1835). International Office of Champa.
- Vickery, Michael (2009), "A short history of Champa", in Hardy, Andrew David; Cucarzi, Mauro; Zolese, Patrizia (eds.), Champa and the Archaeology of Mỹ Sơn (Vietnam), Hawaii: University of Hawaii Press, pp. 45–61, ISBN 978-9-9716-9451-7
