= Battle of Tonle Sap =

1177 conflict involving the Khmer Empire

Battle of Tonle Sap សមរភូមិទន្លេសាប
- Part of Khmer–Cham wars
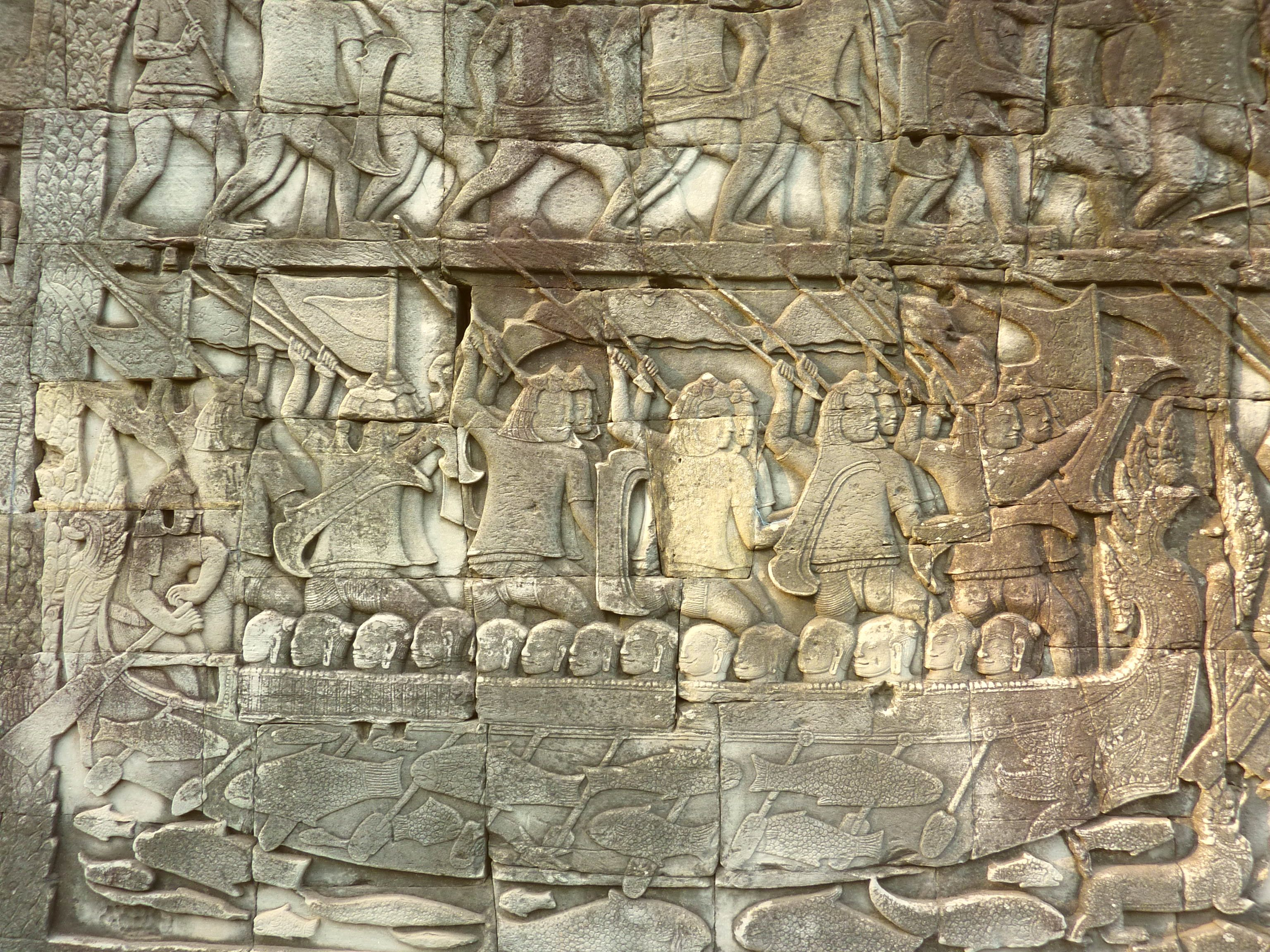
- Relief of Cham forces at Bayon temple
Date	13 June 1177
Location	Tonle Sap, Angkor
Result	Victory of Panduranga; Khmer Empire was colonized for three years.
Territorial changes	Southeastern part of Khmer Empire temporarily became part of Champa.

Belligerents
Khmer Empire	Champa Kingdom; Po Klaung Yăgrai; Montagnard forces

Commanders and leaders
Tribhuvanadityavarman †	Jaya Indravarman IV

The Battle of Tonle Sap (Khmer: សមរភូមិទន្លេសាប, Vietnamese: Thủy chiến Tonlé Sap, French: Bataille de Tonlé Sap) was a conflict between Champa and the Khmer Empire in 1177.

== History ==
The 12th century was a time of conflict and brutal power struggles. Under Suryavarman II (reigned 1113–1150), the Khmer Empire united internally, and the largest temple of Angkor, Angkor Wat, dedicated to the god Vishnu, was built over a period of 37 years. In the east, Suryavarman's campaigns against Champa and An Nam were unsuccessful, though he did sack Vijaya in 1145 and deposed Jaya Indravarman III. The Khmers occupied Vijaya until 1149, when they were driven out by Jaya Harivarman I. Suryavarman II sent a mission to the Chola dynasty of south India and presented a precious stone to the Chola emperor Kulothunga Chola I in 1114.

Another period followed in which kings reigned briefly and were violently overthrown by their successors. Finally in 1177, the capital of Angkor was raided and looted in a naval battle on the Tonle Sap lake by a Cham fleet under Po Klong Garai, king of Panduranga, during which the king of Angkor, Tribhuvanadityavarman, was killed. Po Klong Garai established a new king of Champa, with the title of Jaya Indravarman IV.

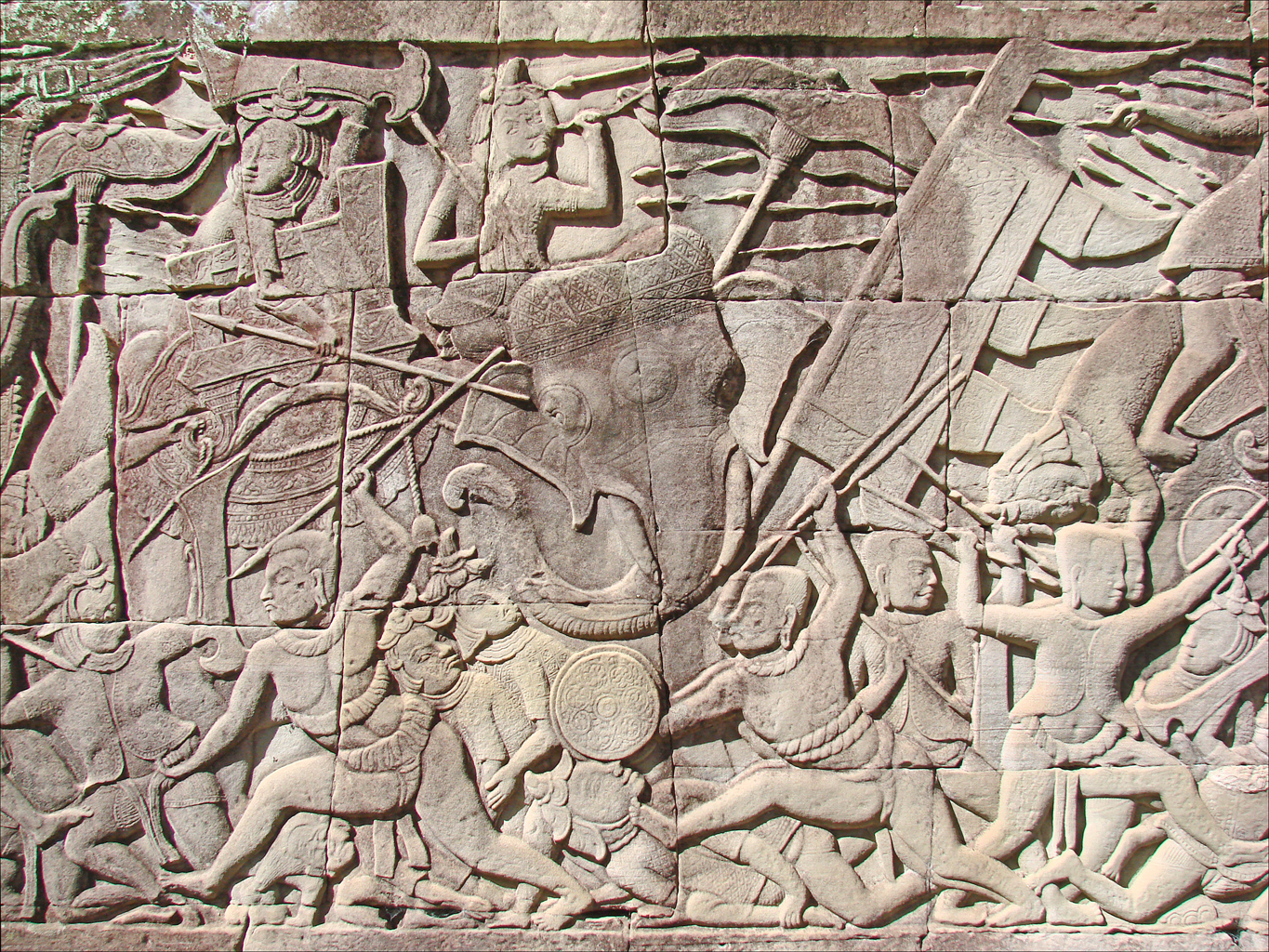
Bas-reliefs du Bayon (Angkor)

Between 1177 and 1181, when he was in his mid 50s, Jayavarman VII came to historical prominence by leading a Khmer army to oust the Cham invaders, which included a naval battle depicted on the walls of Bayon and Banteay Chmar. Returning to the capital, he found it in disorder. He put an end to the disputes between warring factions, and in 1181, he was crowned king.

== Aftermath ==
Mandalas in the 11th–12th centuries

This event marked the peak of the mandala regime in what is now the South Central Coast of modern Vietnam. Soon after, it was disrupted by the expansionist ambitions of the Thăng Long dynasties, followed by the Mongol invasion of Champa. For the Khmer Empire, heavy losses in the central area forced them to abandon the lower Mekong region, leaving it deserted for several centuries until the Nguyễn lords came to reclaim it. The influence of the Khmer Empire then decreased markedly, causing Cham kings to seek marriage with the Javanese royal families for the sake of protection, and at the same time, the Khmer court also began to receive a large number of Muslim settlers, which helped strengthen the very remote lower Mekong region. All of this led to rapid changes in the southern part of the Indochinese peninsula, as Islam became increasingly influential among the aristocracy.

== Legacy ==
The annual Katé festival, held in Ninh Thuận and Lâm Đồng provinces of Vietnam, celebrates the day Po Klong Garai led his army across the Midland Highlands to reach Khmer lands. (Note: Nguyễn Hữu Bài, et al. 2014. Văn hóa dân gian Raglai ở Khánh Hòa. Hồ Chí Minh City: Nhà xuất bản Văn hóa Văn nghệ. ISBN 978-604-68-1078-0)

== See also ==
- Khmer–Cham wars
- Siege of Angkor
- Siege of Longvek

== Bibliography ==
- Aymonier, Etienne (1893). The History of Tchampa (the Cyamba of Marco Polo, Now Annam Or Cochin-China). Oriental University Institute.
- Coedès, George (1968). Vella, Walter F. (ed.). The Indianized States of Southeast Asia. trans.Susan Brown Cowing. University of Hawaii Press. ISBN 978-0-8248-0368-1.
- Golzio, Karl-Heinz (2021). "The rise of the Angkorian Empire in reality and in the imagination of the 11th century: How it became the paramount power". Journal of Global Archaeology: 1–38. doi:10.34780/a11-ef6n.
- Higham, Charles (2004). The Civilization of Angkor. University of California Press. ISBN 978-0-520-24218-0.
- Kulke, Hermann; Rothermund, Dietmar (1998). A History of India. Routledge. ISBN 0-41515-482-0.
- Maspero, Georges (2002). The Champa Kingdom. White Lotus Co., Ltd.
- Prakash, Om; Lombard, Denys (1999). Commerce and Culture in the Bay of Bengal, 1500–1800. Manohar.
- Albanese, Marilia (2006). The Treasures of Angkor (Paperback). Vercelli: White Star Publishers. ISBN 978-88-544-0117-4.
- Briggs, Lawrence Robert (1951, reprinted 1999). The Ancient Khmer Empire. White Lotus. ISBN 974-8434-93-1
- Falser, Michael (2020). Angkor Wat – A Transcultural History of Heritage. Volume 1: Angkor in France. From Plaster Casts to Exhibition Pavilions. Volume 2: Angkor in Cambodia. From Jungle Find to Global Icon. Berlin-Boston DeGruyter ISBN 978-3-11-033584-2
- Forbes, Andrew; Henley, David (2011). Angkor, Eighth Wonder of the World. Chiang Mai: Cognoscenti Books. ASIN B0085RYW0O
- Freeman, Michael and Jacques, Claude (1999). Ancient Angkor. River Books. ISBN 0-8348-0426-3.
- Higham, Charles (2001). The civilization of Angkor. London: Phoenix. ISBN 1-84212-584-2.
- Higham, Charles (2003). Early Cultures of Mainland Southeast Asia. Art Media Resources. ISBN 1-58886-028-0
- Hing Thoraxy. Achievement of "APSARA": Problems and Resolutions in the Management of the Angkor Area
- Jessup, Helen Ibbitson; Brukoff, Barry (2011). Temples of Cambodia – The Heart of Angkor (Hardback). Bangkok: River Books. ISBN 978-616-7339-10-8.
- Petrotchenko, Michel (2011). Focusing on the Angkor Temples: The Guidebook, 383 pages, Amarin Printing and Publishing, 2nd edition, ISBN 978-616-305-096-0
- Ray, Nick (2002). Lonely Planet guide to Cambodia (4th edition). ISBN 1-74059-111-9
- Gin, Ooi Keat (2004), Southeast Asia: A Historical Encyclopedia, from Angkor Wat to Timor. R–Z. Volume three, ABC-CLIO
- Hooker, M.B. (1988), Islam in South East Asia, Brill
- George Coedes. The Making of South East Asia, 2nd ed. University of California Press, 1983.
- Trần Ngọc Thêm. Cơ sở văn hóa Việt Nam (The Foundation of Vietnamese Culture), 504 pages. Publishing by Nhà xuất bản Đại học Tổng hợp TPHCM. Saigon, Vietnam, 1995.
- Trần Quốc Vượng, Tô Ngọc Thanh, Nguyễn Chí Bền, Lâm Mỹ Dung, Trần Thúy Anh. Cơ sở văn hóa Việt Nam Archived 31 May 2024 at the Wayback Machine (The Basis of Vietnamese Culture), 292 pages. Re-publishing by Nhà xuất bản Giáo Dục Việt Nam & Quảng Nam Printing Co-Ltd. Hanoi, Vietnam, 2006.
- Samuel Baron, Christoforo Borri, Olga Dror, Keith W. Taylor (2018). Views of Seventeenth-Century Vietnam : Christoforo Borri on Cochinchina and Samuel Baron on Tonkin. Cornell University Press. ISBN 978-1-501-72090-1.
