= Đại Việt–Khmer War =

Series of conflicts between Đại Việt and the Khmer Empire

- Part of Khmer–Cham wars
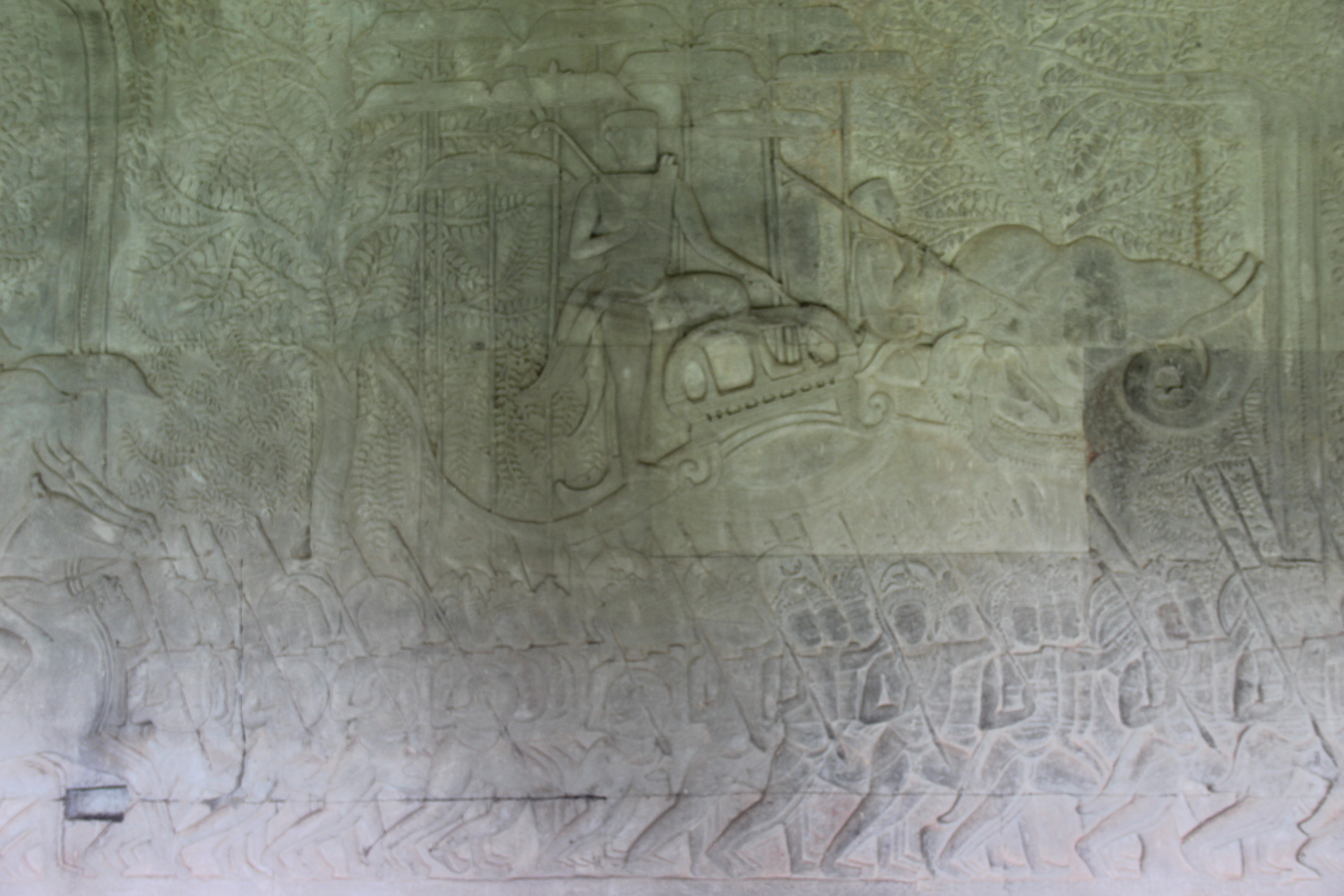
- relief of Suryavarman II force troops to invasion Đại Việt in Angkor wat temple.
Date	1128–1150
Location	Central Vietnam, Gulf of Tonkin
Result	Inconclusive; Khmer invasion in 1128 repelled; Khmer navy troops loot Thanh Hóa in 1132; Đại Việt expedition in 1136 withdrew

Belligerents
Đại Việt (Lý dynasty)	Khmer Empire; Kingdom of Champa (1132–1136)

Commanders and leaders
Lý Thần Tông; Đỗ Anh Vũ; Dương Ngộ; Nguyễn Hà Viêm; Dương Anh Nhĩ; Lý Công Bình	Suryavarman II; Jaya Indravarman III

Strength
30,000 soldiers (1136)	20,000 soldiers (1128); 700 ships (1132)

The Đại Việt–Khmer War were a series of wars and conflicts fought between Đại Việt and the combined forces of Champa and the Khmer Empire between 1128 and 1150.

== Background ==
In 1127, Emperor Lý Nhân Tông died. 12-year-old Lý Thần Tông ascended the throne. Taking advantage of this opportunity, King Suryavarman II immediately sent troops to invade Đại Việt.

== The conflicts ==
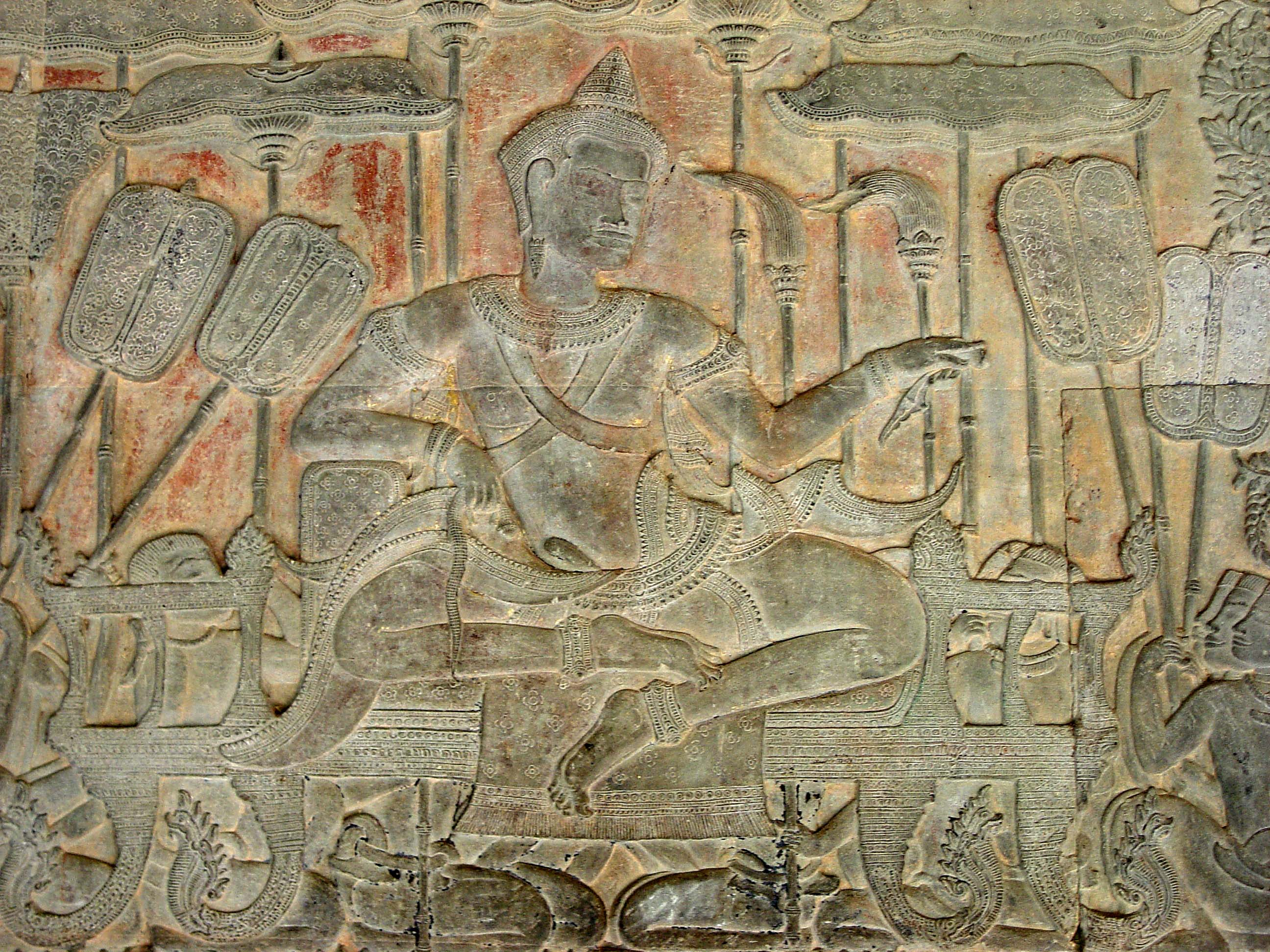
Suryavarman II

In 1127, Suryavarman II demanded Vietnamese emperor Lý Dương Hoán to pay tribute for the Khmer Empire, but the Vietnamese refused. Suryavarman decided to expand his territory northward into Vietnamese territory. The first attack was in 1128 when King Suryavarman led 20,000 soldiers from Savannakhet to Nghệ An, where they were routed in battle. The following year Suryavarman continued skirmishes on land and sent 700 ships to bombard the coastal areas of Đại Việt. In 1132, he persuaded Cham king Jaya Indravarman III to join forces with him to attack Đại Việt, where they briefly seized Nghệ An and pillaged the coastal districts of Thanh Hoá.

In 1136, a Vietnamese force under Đỗ Anh Vũ counterattacked the Khmer Empire across modern-day Laos with 30,000 men, but later retreated. The Cham thereupon made peace with the Vietnamese, and when Suryavarman renewed the attack, Jaya Indravarman refused to cooperate with the Khmers. After a failed attempt to seize seaports in southern Đại Việt, Suryavarman turned to invade Champa in 1145 and sacked Vijaya, ending the reign of Jaya Indravarman III and destroying the temples at Mỹ Sơn. In 1147 when a Panduranga prince named Sivänandana was enthroned as Jaya Harivarman I of Champa, Suryavarman sent an army consisting of Khmers and defected Chams under the command of the senäpati (military commander) Sankara to attack Harivarman, but was defeated in the battle of Räjapura in 1148. Another stronger Khmer army also suffered the same wretchedness fate at the battles of Virapura (present-day Nha Trang) and Caklyaṅ. Michael Vickery (2011) conjectures that both Räjapura, Virapura, and Caklyaṅ's modern-day precise locations are unknown, but proposes that those medieval locations should be somewhere between Qui Nhon and Phan Rang.

== Aftermath ==
After a failed attempt to seize seaports in southern Đại Việt, Suryavarman turned to invade Champa in 1145 and sacked Vijaya, ending the reign of Jaya Indravarman III and destroying the temples at Mỹ Sơn. Inscriptional evidence suggests that Suryavarman II died between 1145 AD and 1150 AD, possibly during a military campaign against Champa. He was succeeded by Dharanindravarman II, a cousin, son of the brother of the king's mother. A period of weak rule and feuding began.

The three provinces Dia Ly (Jriy), Bo Chinh (Traik), Malinh, which Champa had lost to the Đại Việt around 1069–1076, were probably returned to the Cham sphere of influence during 1131-1136, which was testified by both Chinese and Cham sources.

== Sources ==
- Coèdes, George (1968). Vella, Walter F. (ed.). The Indianized States of Southeast Asia. trans.Susan Brown Cowing. University of Hawaii Press, ISBN 978-0-8248-0368-1.
- Hall, Daniel George Edward (1981), History of South East Asia, Macmillan Education, Limited, ISBN 978-1-349-16521-6
- Kiernan, Ben (2017), Việt Nam: A History from Earliest Times to the Present, Oxford University Press, ISBN 978-0-19-516076-5.
- Kohn, George Childs (2013), Dictionary of Wars, Routledge, ISBN 978-1-135-95494-9.
- Maspero, Georges (2002). The Champa Kingdom. White Lotus Co. Ltd. ISBN 978-974-7534-99-3.
- Miksic, John Norman; Yian, Goh Geok (2016). Ancient Southeast Asia. Routledge. ISBN 978-0-41573-554-4.
- Momorki, Shiro (2011), ""Mandala Campa" Seen from Chinese Sources", in Lockhart, Bruce; Trần, Kỳ Phương (eds.), The Cham of Vietnam: History, Society and Art, Hawaii: University of Hawaii Press, pp. 120–137
