= Khmer–Cham wars =

Wars between the Khmer Empire and Champa

Khmer–Cham wars were a series of conflicts and contests between states of the Khmer Empire and Champa, later involving Đại Việt, that lasted from the mid-10th century to the early 13th century in mainland Southeast Asia. The first conflict began in 950 AD when Khmer troops sacked the Cham principality of Kauthara. Tensions between the Khmer Empire and Champa reached a climax in the middle of the 12th century when both deployed field armies and waged devastating wars against each other. The conflicts ended after the Khmer army voluntarily retreated from occupying Champa in 1220.

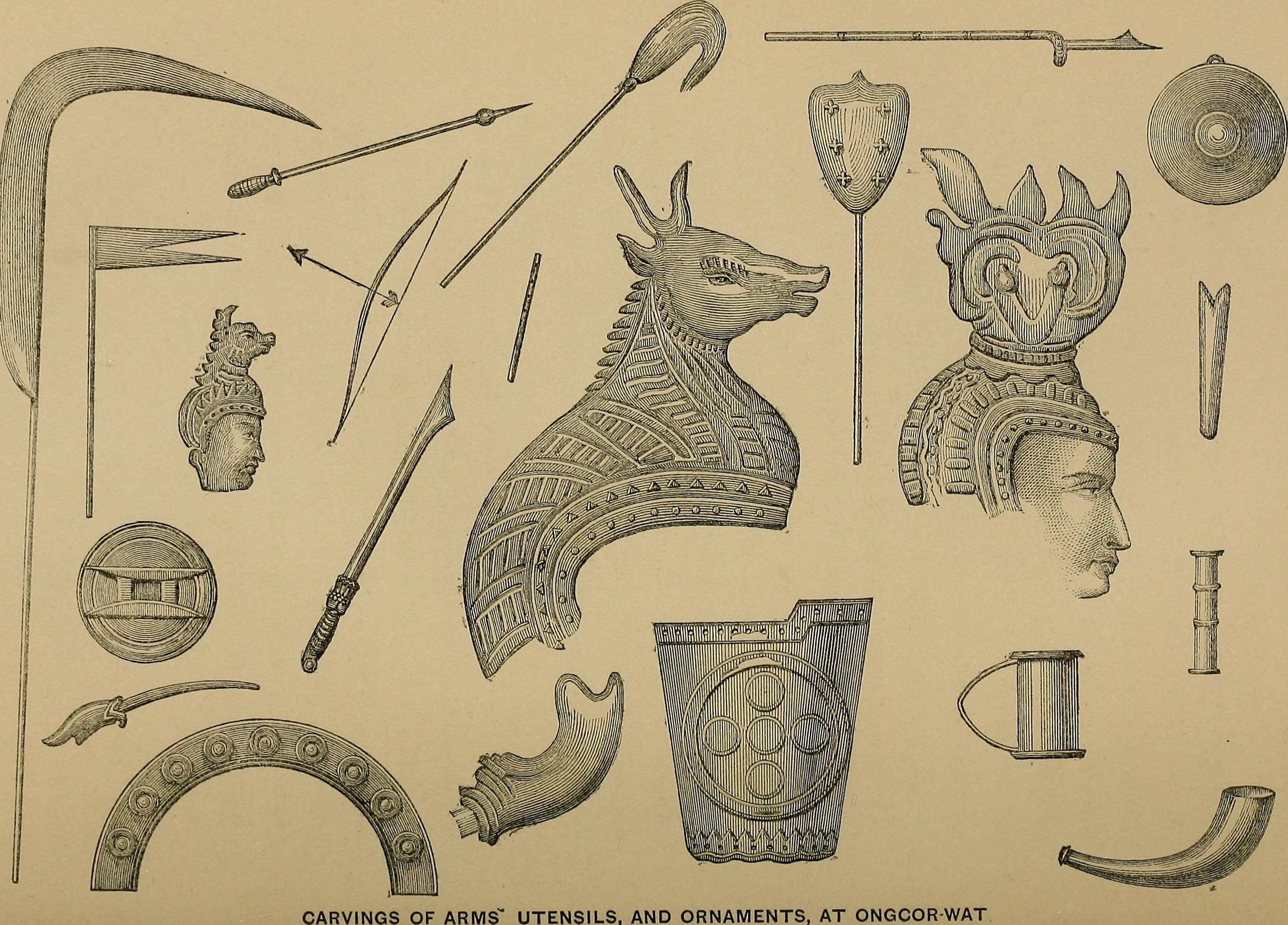
Helmets, weapons, and armoury of Kambuja's military as depicted in Angkor Wat. Taken from French explorer Henri Mouhot's book.

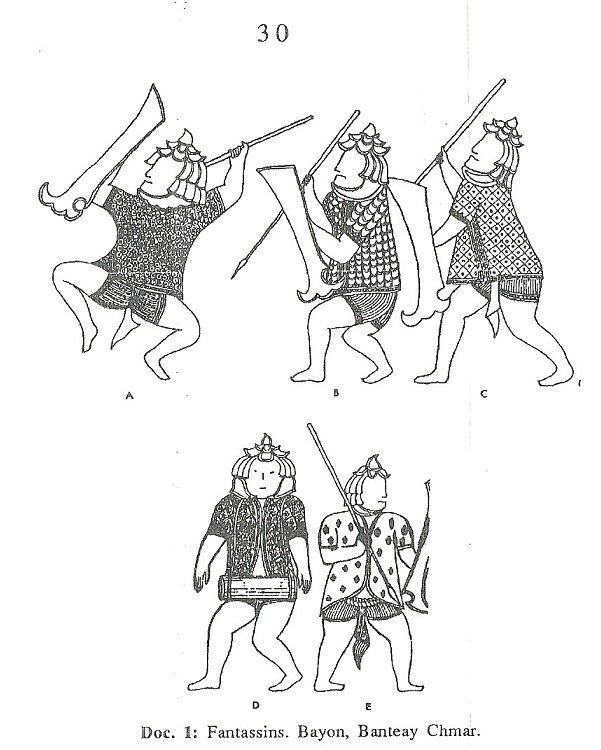
12th-century Champa marines wore various types of armor. They appear to be leather armor, scale lamellar, chainmail, and buff coat. Excerpted from Angkor bas reliefs.

== Khmer invasion of Kauthara (950) ==
Around 950, the Angkorian army under Rajendravarman II crossed the forest, pillaged the temple of Po Nagar in Kauthara and carried off the golden statue of Bhagavati in the temple, Champa's holiest deity. The invasion however ended in a "bloody defeat". In 965, the Cham King Jaya Indravaman I restored the temple and rebuilt the statue of the goddess to replace the one stolen by the Khmer.

Khmer invasion of Kauthara (950)
- Part of Khmer-Cham War
| Date | c. 950 |
| Location | Kauthara, Po Nagar |
| Result | Khmer victory |

Belligerents
| Khmer Empire | Champa kingdom |

Commanders and leaders
| Rajendravarman II | Jaya Indravaman I |

Strength
| Unknown | Unknown |

Casualties and losses
| Unknown | Unknown |

== Khmer invasions of Northern Champa (1074–1080) ==
In 1074, Harivarman IV became king of Champa. He had close ties to Song China and made peace with Dai Viet, but provoked a war with the Khmer Empire. In 1080, a Khmer army attacked Vijaya and other centers in northern Champa. Temples and monasteries were sacked and cultural treasures were carried off. After much chaos, Cham troops under King Harivarman were able to defeat the invaders and restore the capital and temples. Subsequently, his raiding forces penetrated Cambodia as far as Sambor and the Mekong, where they destroyed all religious sanctuaries.

Northern Champa (1074–1080)
- Part of Khmer-Cham War
| Date | 1074–1080 |
| Location | Northern Champa |
| Result | Cham defensive victory |

Belligerents
| Khmer Empire | Champa kingdom |

Commanders and leaders
| Sangrama | Harivarman IV |

Strength
| Unknown | Unknown |

Casualties and losses
| Unknown | Unknown |

== Suryavarman II's wars (1128–1150) ==
In 1127, Suryavarman II demanded Vietnamese king Lý Dương Hoán to pay tribute for the Khmer Empire, but the Vietnamese refused. Suryavarman decided to expand his territory northward into Vietnamese territory. The first attack was in 1128 when King Suryavarman led 20,000 soldiers from Savannakhet to Nghệ An, where they were routed in battle. The following year Suryavarman continued skirmishes on land and sent 700 ships to bombard the coastal areas of Đại Việt. In 1132, he persuaded Cham king Jaya Indravarman III to join forces with him to attack Đại Việt, where they briefly seized Nghệ An and pillaged the coastal districts of Thanh Hoá.

In 1136, a Vietnamese force under Đỗ Anh Vũ counterattacked the Khmer Empire across modern-day Laos with 30,000 men, but later retreated. The Cham thereupon made peace with the Vietnamese, and when Suryavarman renewed the attack, Jaya Indravarman refused to cooperate with the Khmers. After a failed attempt to seize seaports in southern Đại Việt, Suryavarman turned to invade Champa in 1145 and sacked Vijaya, ending the reign of Jaya Indravarman III and destroying the temples at Mỹ Sơn. In 1147 when a Panduranga prince named Sivänandana was enthroned as Jaya Harivarman I of Champa, Suryavarman sent an army consisting of Khmers and defected Chams under the command of the senäpati (military commander) Sankara to attack Harivarman, but was defeated in the battle of Räjapura in 1148. Another stronger Khmer army also suffered the same wretchedness fate at the battles of Virapura (present-day Nha Trang) and Caklyaṅ. Michael Vickery (2011) conjectures that both Räjapura, Virapura, and Caklyaṅ's modern-day precise locations are unknown, but proposes that those medieval locations should be somewhere between Qui Nhon and Phan Rang.

Unable to overwhelm the Cham, Suryavarman appointed Prince Harideva, a Cham royalty of Cambodian background, as the puppet king of Champa in Vijaya. In 1149, Harivarman marched his army northward to Vijaya, besieging the city, vanquishing Harideva's army at the battle of Mahisa, then executed Harideva along with all of his Cambodian–Cham officials and military, therefore ended Suryavarman's occupation of northern Champa. Harivarman then reunited the kingdom. A royal pretender, Vamsaraja, attacked Harivarman with highland troops but was defeated and escaped to Đại Việt. Later Vamsaraja was crushed by Harivarman and slain during the Battle of Mỹ Sơn in 1150.

== Siege of Vijaya (1145) ==
Siege of Vijaya
- Part of Khmer-Cham War
| Date | 1145 |
| Location | Vijaya, Mỹ Sơn |
| Result | Khmer victory, city sacked: Mỹ Sơn temple was destroyed |
| Territorial changes | Champa Kingdom become of the Khmer colony |

Belligerents
| Khmer Empire | Champa kingdom |

Suryavarman II turned to invade Champa in 1145 and sacked Vijaya, ending the reign of Jaya Indravarman III and destroying the temples at Mỹ Sơn. Inscriptional evidence suggests that Suryavarman II died between 1145 AD and 1150 AD, possibly during a military campaign against Champa. He was succeeded by Dharanindravarman II, a cousin, son of the brother of the king's mother. A period of weak rule and feuding began.The three provinces Dia Ly, Bo Chinh, Malinh, which Champa had lost to the Dai Viet around 1069–1076, were probably returned to the Cham sphere of influence during 1131-1136, which was testified by both Chinese and Cham sources.

== Cham invasions on Angkor (1170, 1177–1181) ==
After securing peace with Đại Việt in 1170, Cham forces under Jaya Indravarman IV invaded the Khmer Empire over land with inconclusive results. That year, a Chinese official from Hainan had witnessed elephant duel battles between Cham and Khmer armies, henceforth convincing the Cham king to offer war horse purchases from China, but the offer was rejected by the Song court multiple times. In 1177, however, his troops launched a surprise attack against the Khmer capital of Yasodharapura from warships piloted up the Mekong River to the great lake Tonlé Sap and killed the Khmer king Tribhuvanadityavarman. Multiple-bow siege crossbows were introduced to Champa from Song dynasty in 1171, and later were mounted on the backs of Cham and Vietnamese war elephants. They were deployed by the Cham during the siege of Angkor, which was lightly defended by wooden palisades, leading to the Cham occupation of Cambodia for the next four years.

Cham mercenaries and auxiliary troops fought alongside the Khmer in the Battle of Tonlé Sap on 13 June 1177. The Cham wear distinctive helmets shaped as inverted lotus flowers. Behind the Cham commander is a Khmer archer (left). The Kingdom of Champa won the battle. They sacked the Khmer capital of Yasodharapura and dominated the Khmer Empire for 4 years. King Jayavarman VII of the Khmer Empire expelled the Cham invaders from Angkor in 1181. This bas-relief detail was made in the late 12th century. It's located in the outer gallery of the Bayon Temple in Angkor Thom, Siem Reap, Cambodia.

The Khmer empire pire was in the verge of collapse. Jayavarman VII from the north coalesced an army to battle the invaders. He had campaigned against the Chams in his youth, in the 1140s, and participated in a campaign in Cham capital Vijaya. His army won a series of unprecedented victories over the Cham, and by 1181 after winning a decisive naval battle, Jayavarman had rescued the empire and expelled the Cham.

== Khmer conquest of Champa (1190–1203) ==
Khmer conquest of Champa
- Part of Khmer-Cham War
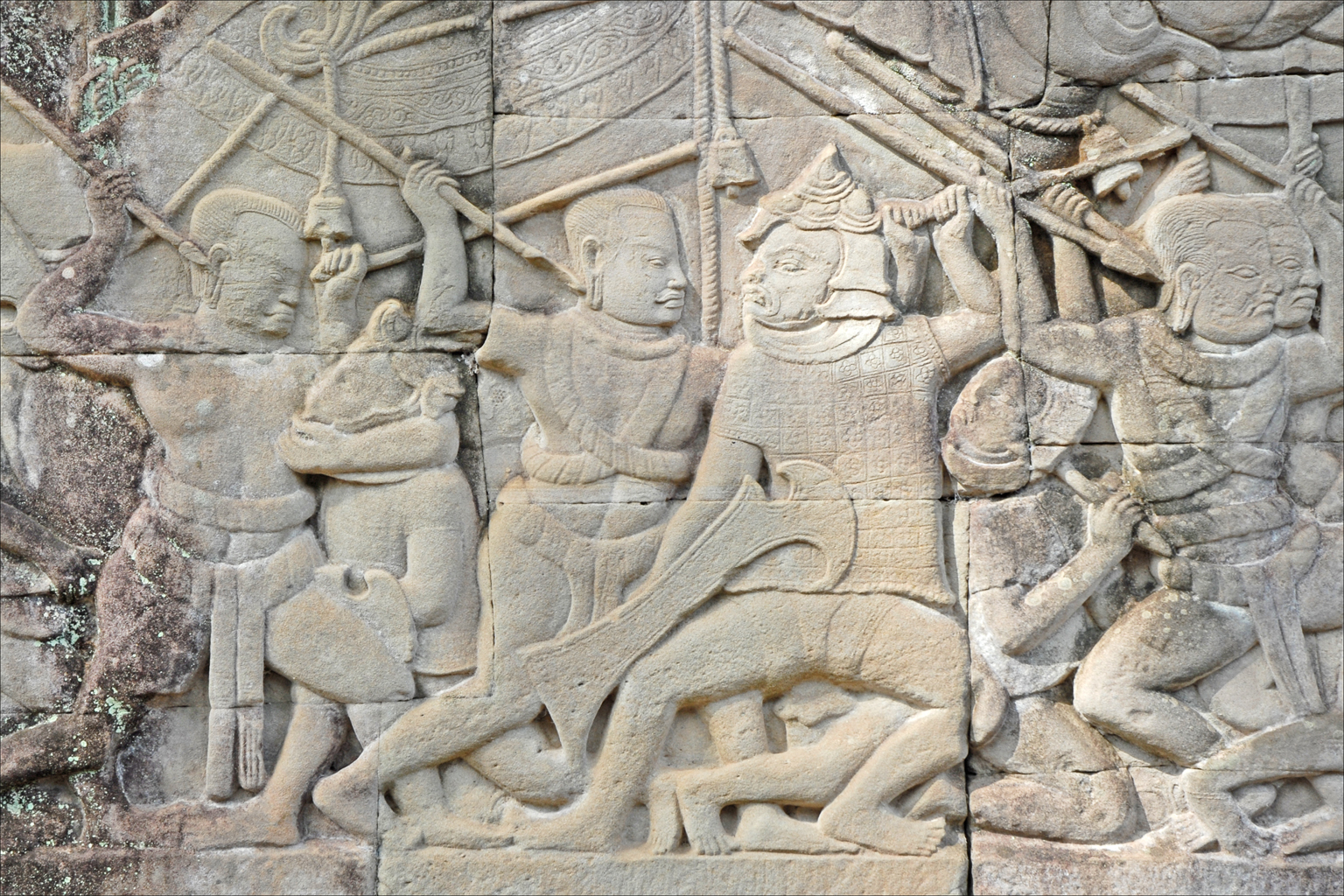
- Le Bayon est le temple-montagne du roi khmer : Jayavarman VII (1181-1218), le vainqueur des Chams et le plus grand constructeur des rois khmers. La construction du Bayon a commencé vers 1195. Ce temple est célèbre pour ses 54 tours décorées par 4 visages.
| Date | 1190; 1192; 1195; 1198–1199; 1201-1203 |
| Location | Champa |
| Result | Khmer victory: Vijaya fall and Jaya Indravarman IV was captured; Champa came under strong Khmer control for years, though rebellions and later changes followed |
| Territorial changes | Champa Kingdom become of the Khmer colony |

Belligerents
| Khmer Empire | Champa kingdom |

Commanders and leaders
| Jayavarman VII | Jaya Indravarman V †; Jaya Indravarman IV (POW); Vidyanandana (surrendered) |

Strength
| 12,000 troops | 40,000 troops |

Casualties and losses
| Unknown | Unknown |

In 1190, the Khmer king Jayavarman VII appointed a Cham prince named Vidyanandana, who had defected to Jayavarman in 1182 and had been educated at Angkor, to lead the Khmer army. Vidyanandana defeated the Chams, and proceeded to occupy Vijaya and captured Jaya Indravarman IV, whom he sent back to Angkor as a prisoner. Adopting the title of Shri Suryavarmadeva (or Suryavarman), Vidyanandana made himself king of Panduranga, which became a Khmer vassal. He made Prince In, a brother-in-law of Jayavarman VII, "King Suryajayavarmadeva in the Nagara of Vijaya" (or Suryajayavarman). In 1191, a revolt at Vijaya drove Suryajayavarman back to Cambodia and enthroned Jaya Indravarman V (Jaya Indravarman oṅ Vatuv). Vidyanandana, assisted by Jayavarman VII, retook Vijaya, killing both Jaya Indravarman IV and Jaya Indravarman V, then "reigned without opposition over the Kingdom of Champa," declaring his independence from the Khmer Empire. Jayavarman VII responded by launching several invasions of Champa in 1192, 1195, 1198–1199, 1201-1203. The Khmer later also had double bow crossbows mounted on elephants, which Michel Jacq Hergoualc'h suggest were elements of Cham mercenaries in Jayavarman VII's army.

Khmer armies under Jayavarman VII continued campaigning against Champa until the Chams were finally defeated in 1203. A Cham renegade-Prince ong Dhanapatigräma, overthrew and expelled his ruling nephew Vidyanandana/Suryavarman to Dai Viet, completing the Khmer conquest of Champa. From 1203 to 1220, Champa as a Khmer province was ruled by a puppet government led by either ong Dhanapatigräma and then prince Angsaräja, son of Harivarman I, who would later become Jaya Paramesvaravarman II. In 1207, Angsaräja accompanied a Khmer army with Burmese and Siamese mercenary contingents to battle against the Yvan (Dai Viet) army. Following the dwindling Khmer military presence and voluntary Khmer evacuation of Champa in 1220, Angsaräja took over the reins of government peacefully, proclaiming himself Jaya Paramesvaravarman II, and restored Champa's independence.

== Gallery ==
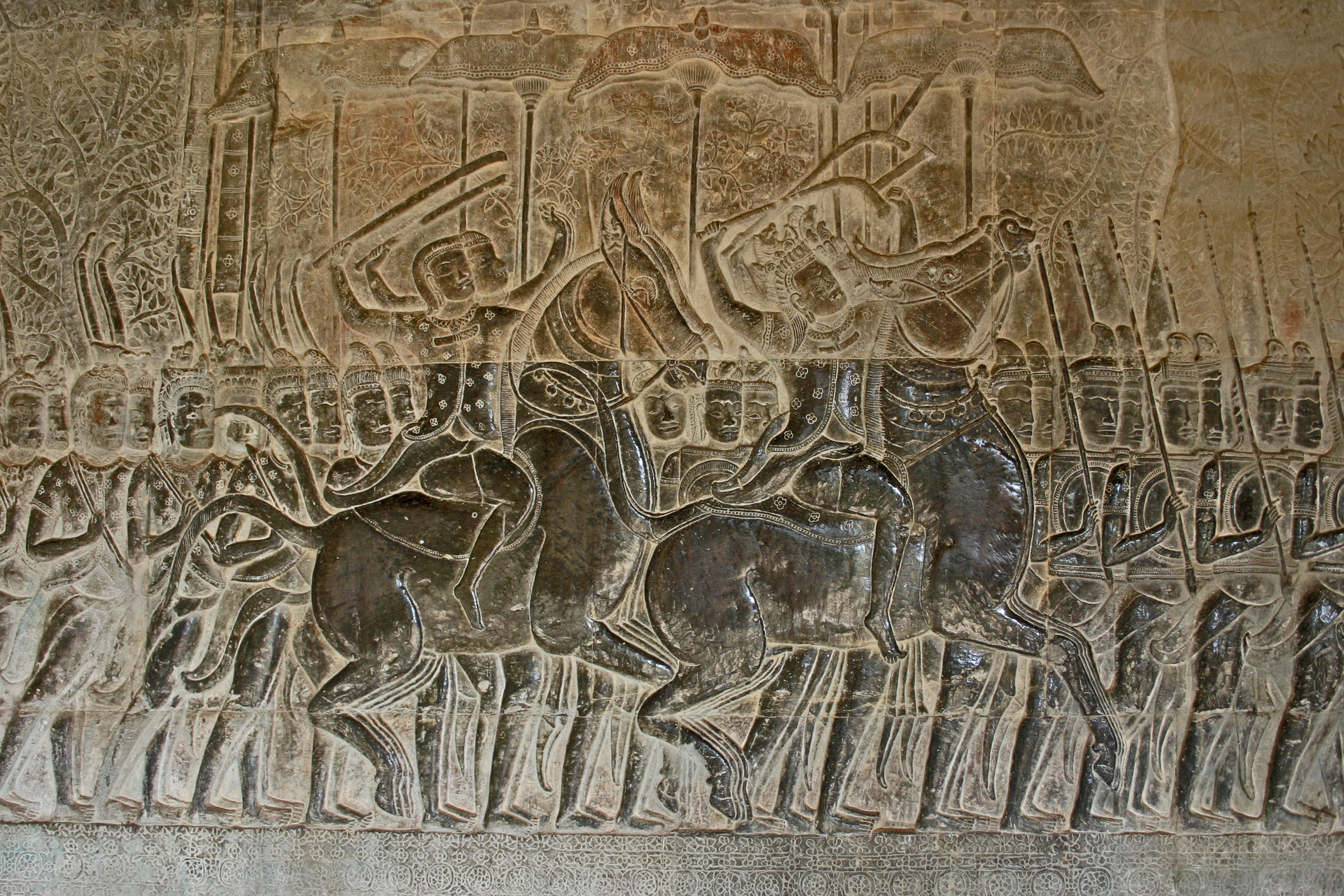
Angkor Wat, Procession of Suryavarman II

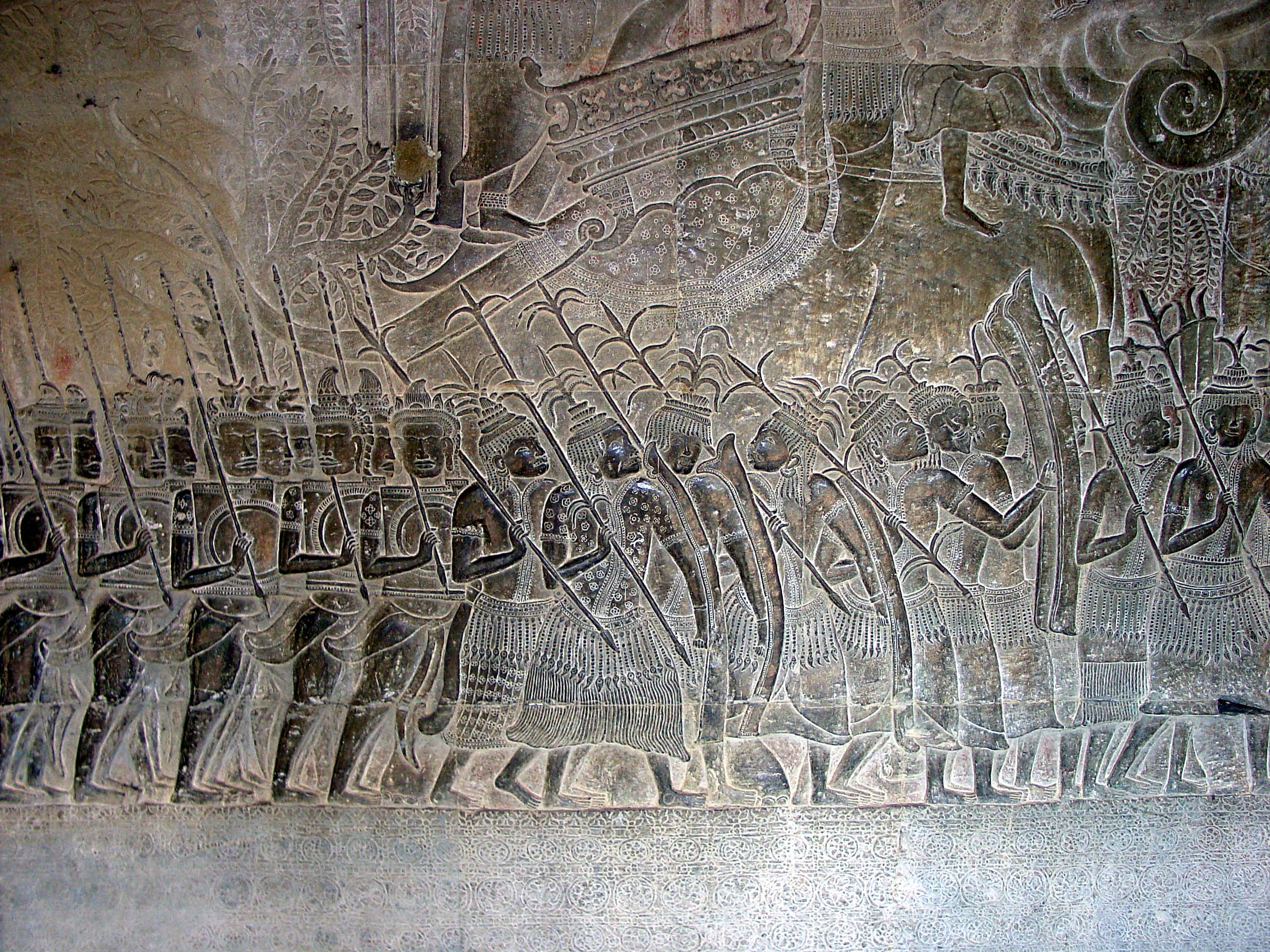
The consensus of modern scholars is that the 12th century marching “Syam Kuk” on Angkor Wat aren't the Tai/Siamese (ethnic Thai). Michael Vickery documents the usage of Syam, Sien, Siam, and the Chinese Hsien by the Cham, Khmer, and Chinese to explain syām kuk doesn’t refer to an ethnicity but a geographic location, specifically the southern central plains of modern Thailand that was populated by the Mon-Khmer in the 12th century.

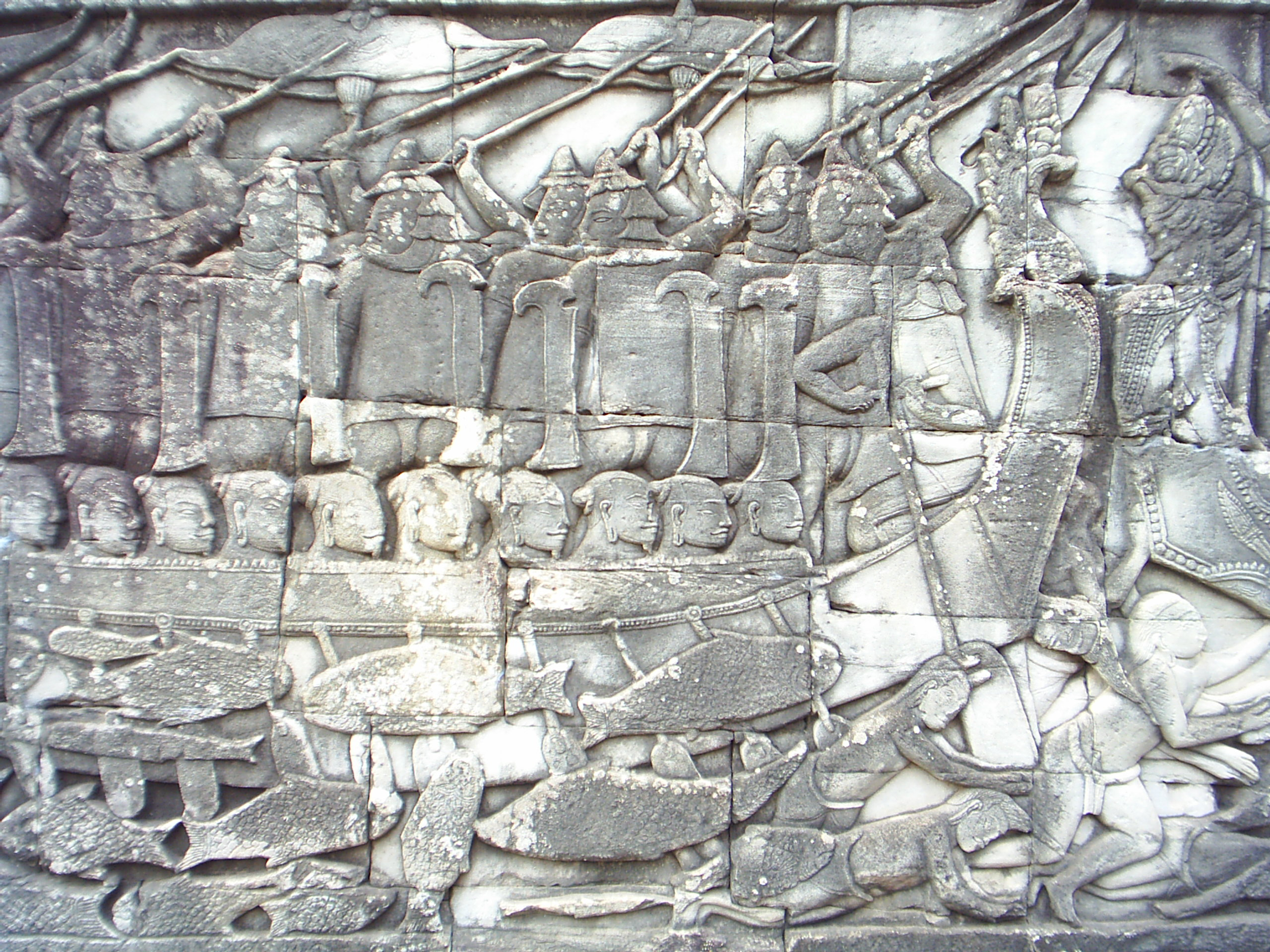
Naval battle on a bas-relief at the Bayon, Angkor, showing Cham soldiers in the boat and dead Khmer fighters in the water.

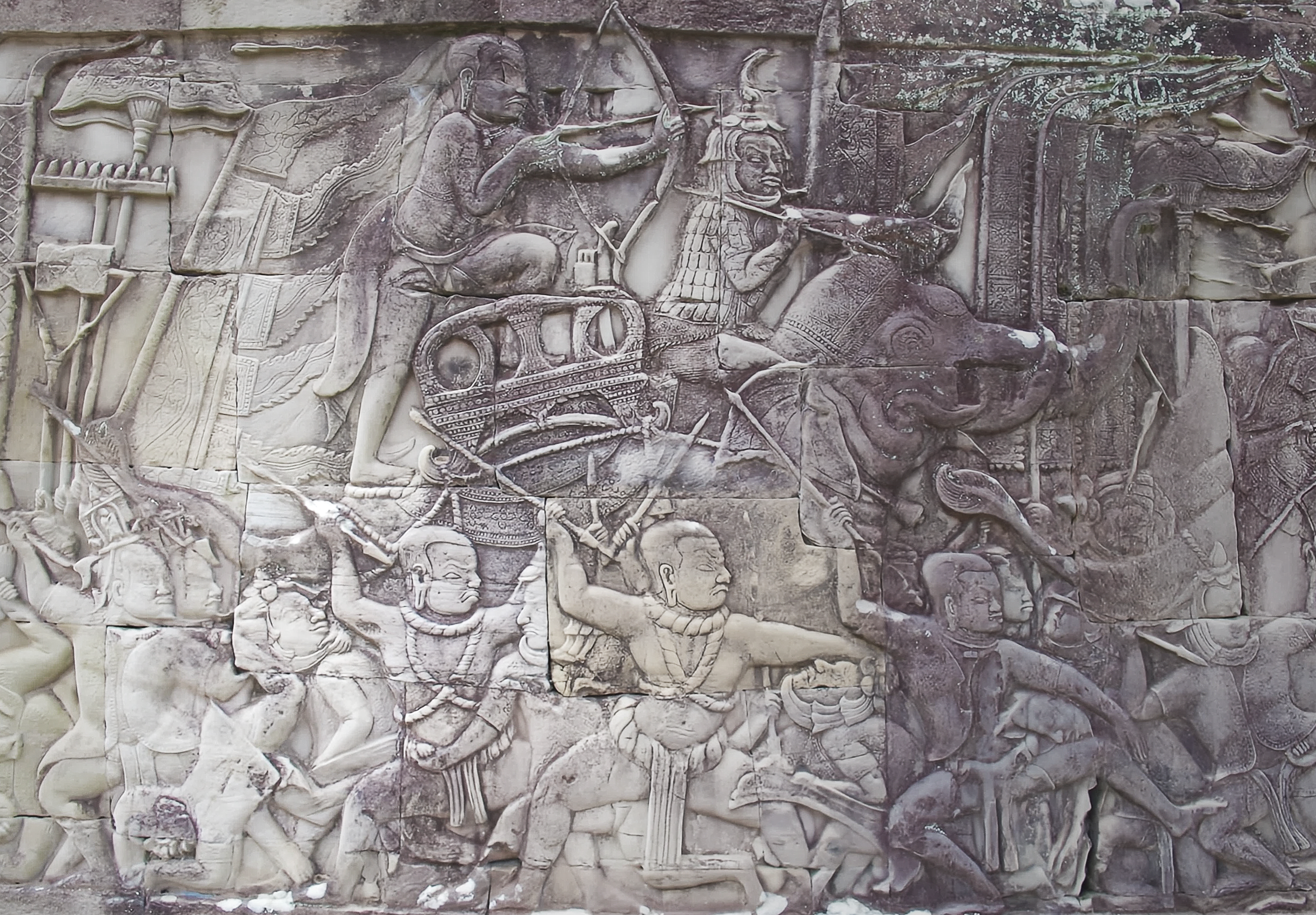
A Cham commander in scale armor sits on a war elephant at Bayon Temple.

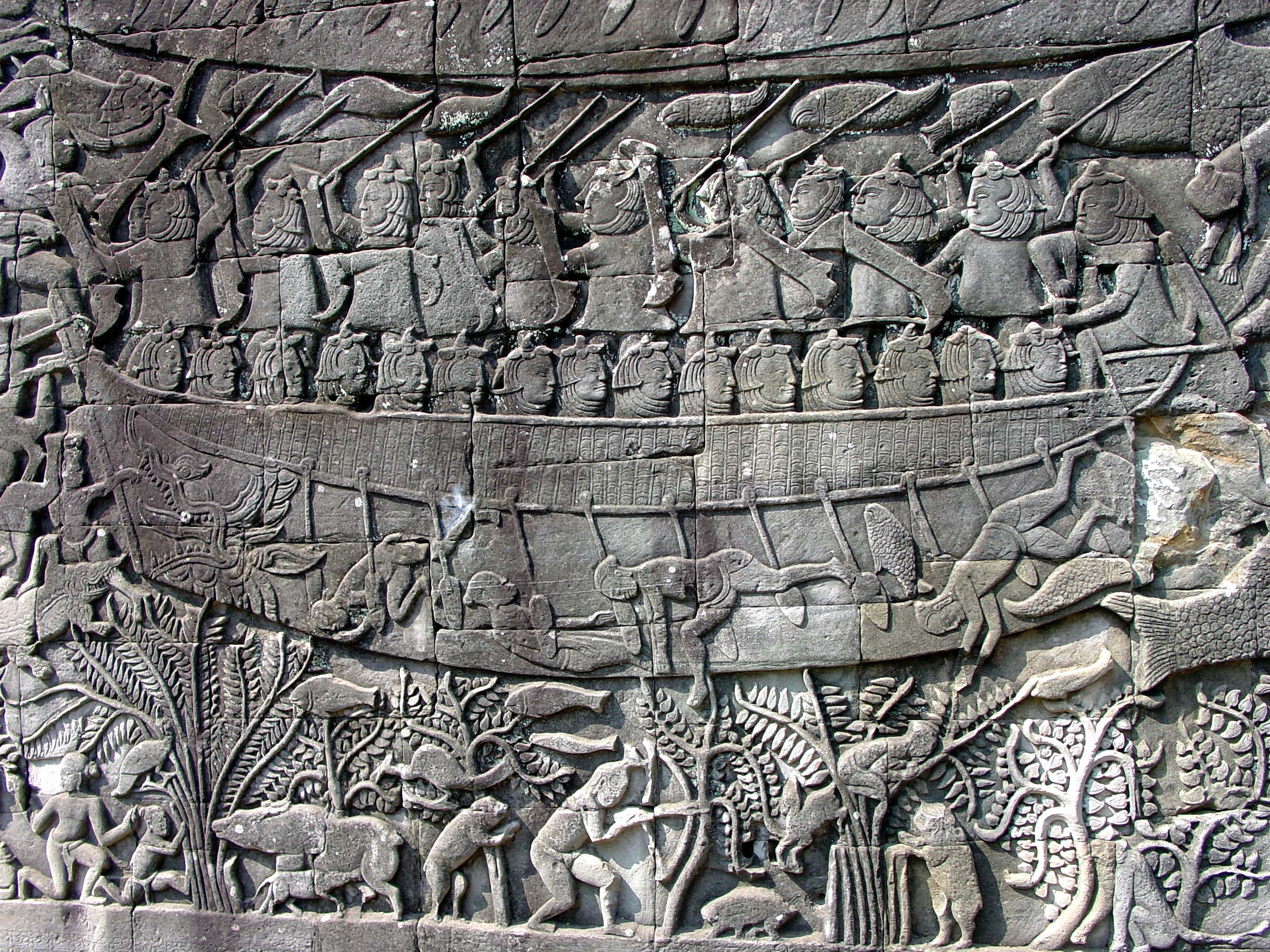
Depiction of a naval battle between the Cham and the Khmer on the Bayon relief

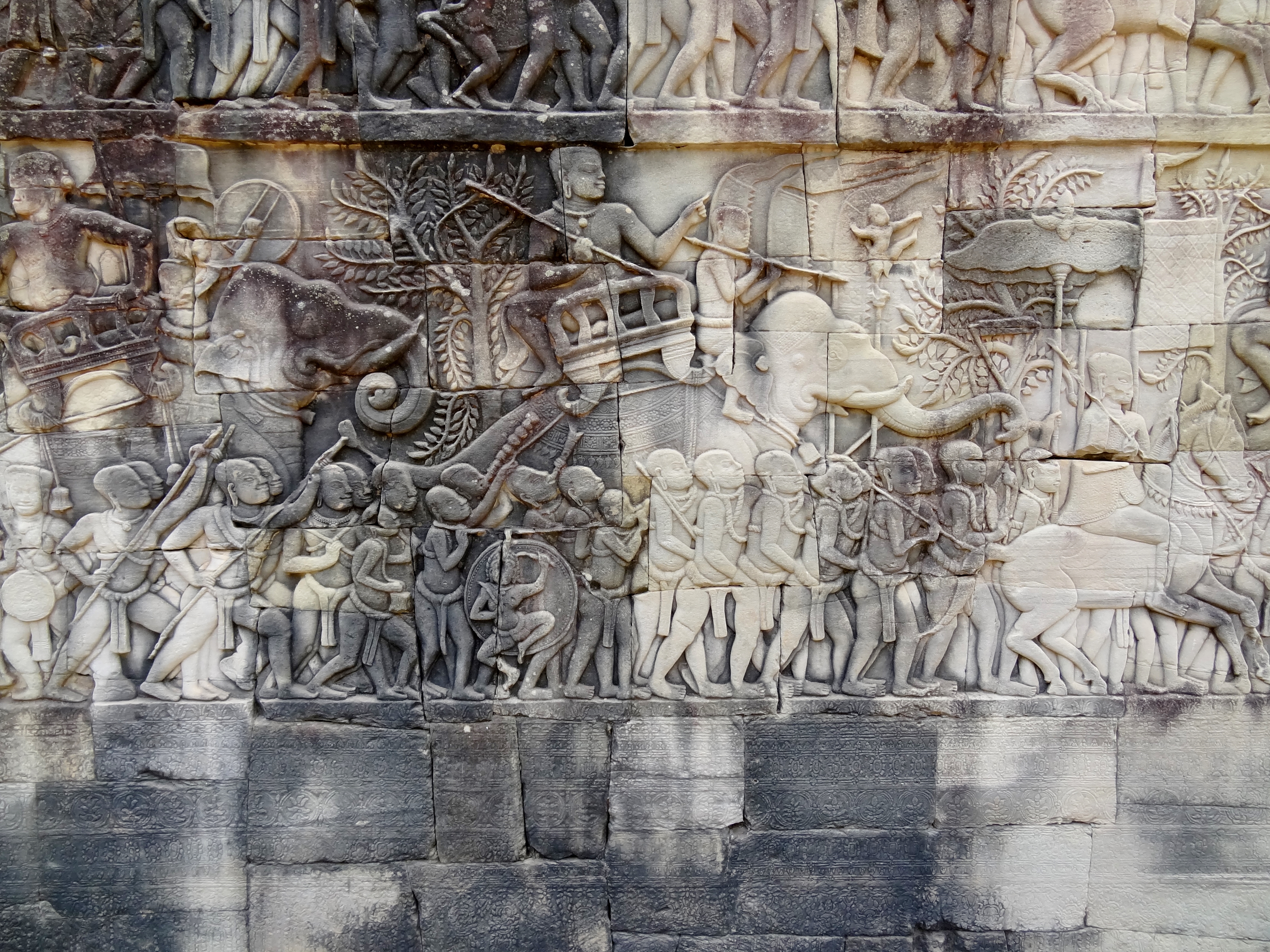
Khmer army with war elephant, detail of the bas-relief of the Battle of Tonlé Sap at the Bayon

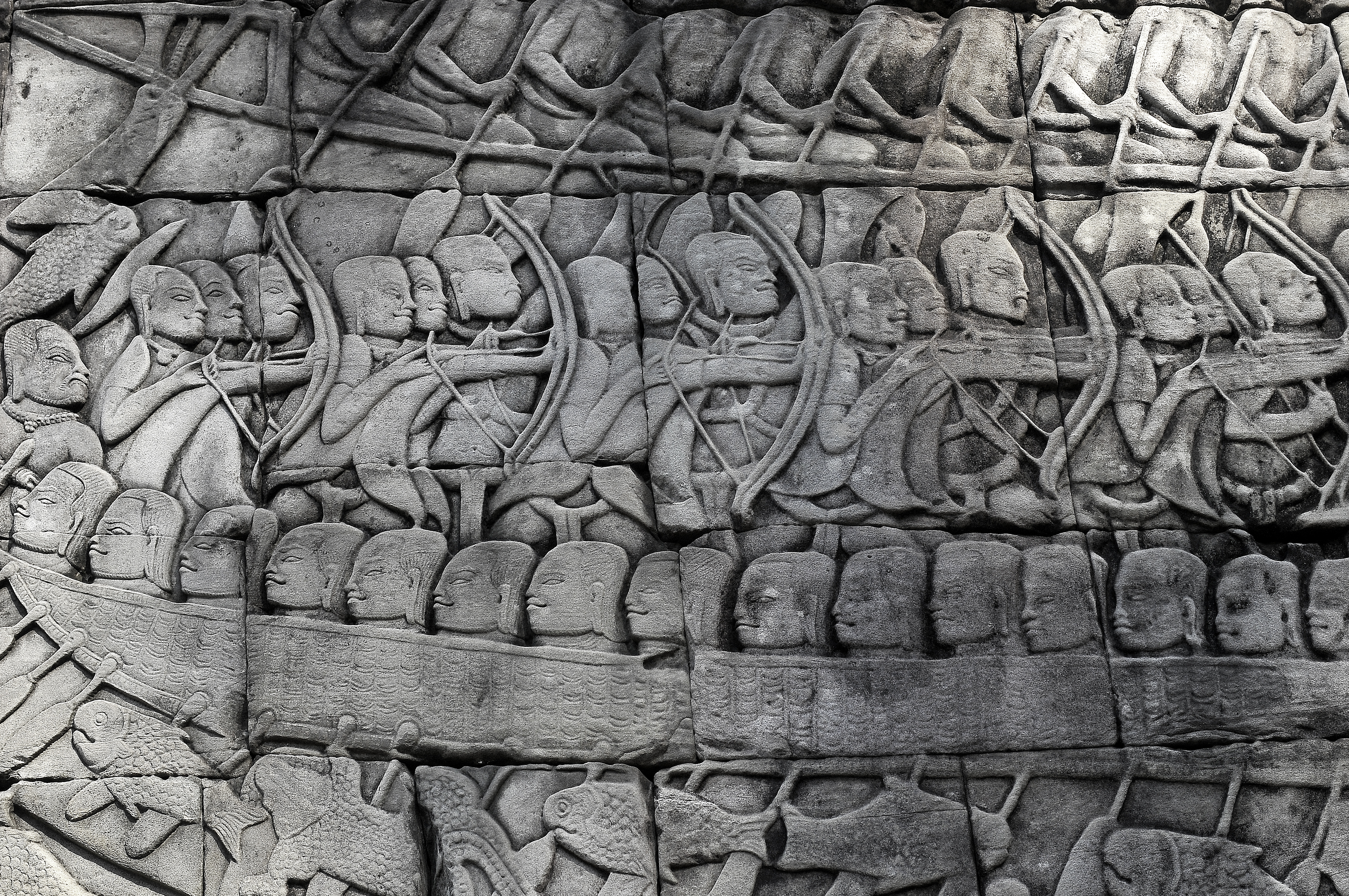
Khmer archers in the 12th century

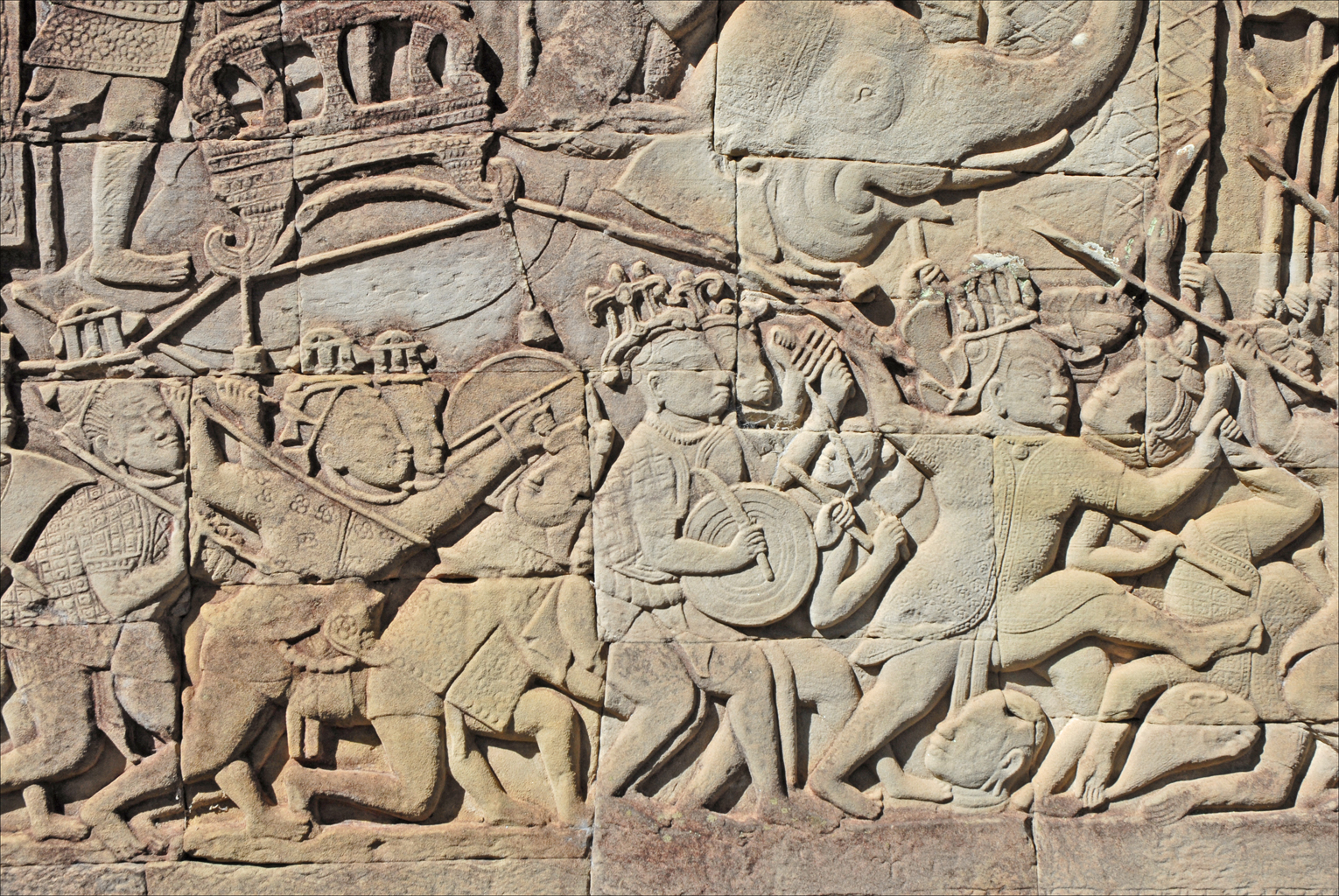
Le Bayon est le temple-montagne du roi khmer : Jayavarman VII (1181-1218), le vainqueur des Chams et le plus grand constructeur des rois khmers. La construction du Bayon a commencé vers 1195. Ce temple est célèbre pour ses 54 tours décorées par 4 visages.

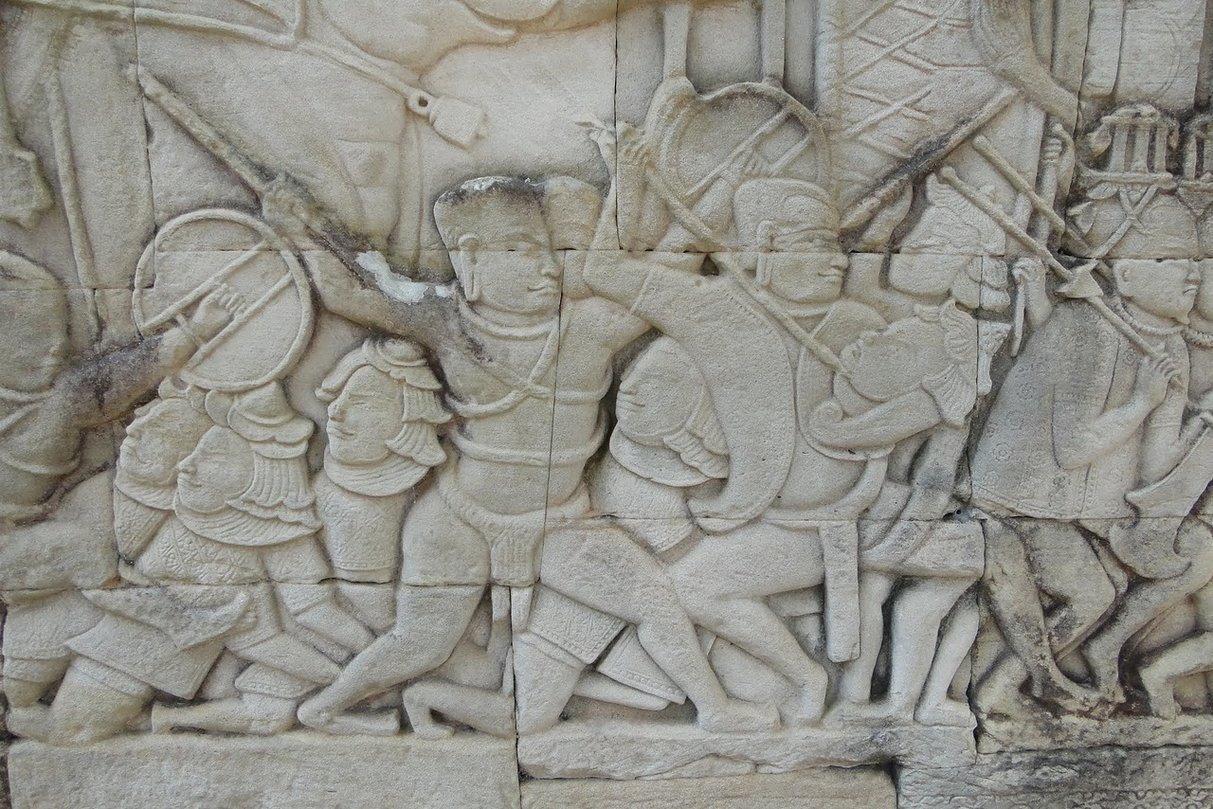
Bayon, detail of a bas-relief

== See also ==
- Đại Việt–Khmer War
- Sino–Cham war
- History of the Cham–Vietnamese wars
