= Rudravarman IV =

- raja-di-raja

King of Champa
- Reign: 1145–1147
- Coronation: No official coronation
- Predecessor: Jaya Indravarman III
- Successor: Jaya Harivarman I
- Died: 1147; Phan Rang
- Issue: Jaya Harivarman I
Names
- Śrī Rudravarmadeva
Posthumous name
- Paramabrahmaloka
- House: Panduranga dynasty
- Religion: Hinduism

Rudravarman IV (?–1147) was a king of Champa during the mid-12th century, at mid of the Angkor invasions of Champa. Rudravarman however has never reigned.

In 1129, king Suryavarman II of the Khmer Empire forced the king of Champa Jaya Indravarman III to join him in campaigns against Dai Viet. The campaign's outcome was of little success with attrition. In 1145 when Indravarman III had made peace with Dai Viet and declined to cooperate with the Khmer, Suryavarman invaded Champa instead. Khmer forces ransacked the capital of Vijaya, deposing Indravarman III.

The kingdom had been plagued in turmoil caused by foreign conquest and social upheavals. As a refugee who had been fleeing Vijaya southward to Panduranga (Phan Rang), Rudravarman had never enjoyed being king, even his own enthronement. His son, prince Sivänandana, "who had been sent to exile and hardship in foreign countries during the time of two previous kings", made a return to Champa, coalescing an army to revolt against Khmer occupants.

Rudravarman died in 1147, while Sivänandana was crowned by his top officials as king Jaya Harivarman I of Champa. Rudravarman was received posthumous title Paramabrahmaloka.

== Bibliography ==
- Coedès, George (1975), Vella, Walter F. (ed.), The Indianized States of Southeast Asia, University of Hawaii Press, ISBN 978-0-824-80368-1
- Golzio, Karl-Heinz (2004), Inscriptions of Campā based on the editions and translations of Abel Bergaigne, Étienne Aymonier, Louis Finot, Édouard Huber and other French scholars and of the work of R. C. Majumdar. Newly presented, with minor corrections of texts and translations, together with calculations of given dates, Shaker Verlag
- Lafont, Pierre-Bernard (2007), Le Campā: Géographie, population, histoire, Indes savantes, ISBN 978-2-84654-162-6
- Maspero, Georges (2002), The Champa Kingdom, White Lotus Co., Ltd, ISBN 978-97475-3-499-3

Preceded by none (Khmer occupation)	King of Champa absent	Succeeded by Jaya Harivarman I 1147–1166
