= Po Klong Garai =

King of the Champa polity of Panduranga (1151–1205)

Po Klaung Yăgrai
- Ruler of Panduranga
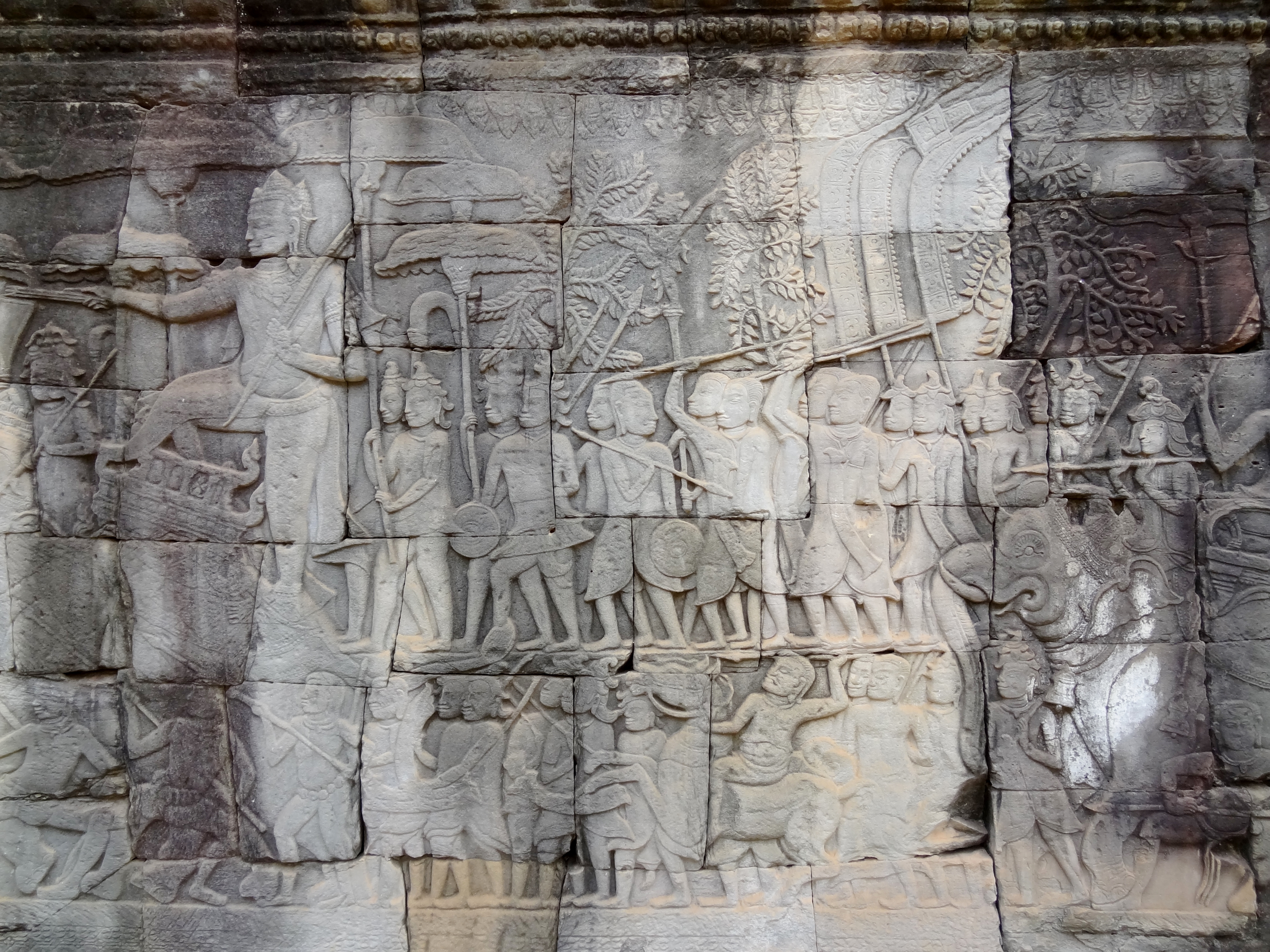
- Portrait of Po Klaung Yăgrai at Bayon temple.

Ruler of Panduranga
- Reign: 1167 - 1205
- Predecessor: Po Sulekha
- Successor: Khmer occupation
- Born: 1151; Palei Chakling, Panduranga
- Died: 1205 (aged 53–54); Băl Hangâu, Panduranga
- Burial: Panduranga
- Spouse: ?
- Issue: ?
Names
- Jatol
Regnal name
- Po Klaung Yăgrai
- House: Panduranga
- Father: On Pasha
- Mother: Muk Chakling
- Religion: Hinduism

Po Klaung Yăgrai (1151–1205) was a king of the Champa polity of Panduranga, in what is now Phan Rang, in southern Vietnam.

== Title ==
Po Klaung Yăgrai is the royal title, not the name of this historical figure. According to understandings of local history, he was not born as a royal and was born with name Jatơl. His title Po Klaung Yăgrai could plausibly be translated from Cham language into English as the "great water-dragon sovereign."

The Cham-language title "Po" means sovereign, "klaung" means great and the name "Yăgrai" likely comes from "Yă" meaning "water" and "garai" meaning "dragon." Another possibility is the term "Yă" is that it is an Old Cham language term truncation of the word "yang" meaning lord or god.

French sources occasionally mistakenly referred to "garai" as related to the term "Jarai" people, likely because /g/ and /j/ could be pronounced the same in French. However, there is not strong evidence the terms are related. However, "Jarai" more likely is derived from the Old Cham root terms "Ja-" and "-rai" meaning "ordinary people who left" (implying they went to the uplands).

== History ==
Po Klaung Yăgrai ruled from 1167 to his death and is credited to have built many irrigation works and dams. He probably is the same person as Champa king, Jaya Indravarman IV. He is worshipped at the Po Klong Garai Temple, built by Champa King Jaya Sinhavarman III (Chế Mân).

== Legend ==
He started life as a lowly cowherd in the lowland village of Caklaing, but became king of Champa by destiny, ruling wisely and for the good of the people. When the Khmer of Cambodia invaded his kingdom, he challenged them to settle the matter peacefully in a tower-building contest. Po Klaung Garai prevailed in the contest, thereby obliging the invaders to return home. After his death, Po Klaung Garai became a god and protector of the people on earth; it is said that the tower he built in his contest with the Khmer was at the site of the tower that bears his name today.

== See also ==
- Battle of Tonlé Sap
- Jaya Indravarman IV
