= Jaya Harivarman I =

- Raja-di-raja

King of Champa
- Reign: 1147/49–1162/67
- Predecessor: Jaya Indravarman III
- Successor: Jaya Harivarman II
- Born: ? Phan Rang, Champa
- Died: 1162 or 1167; Vijaya, Champa
- Spouse: Jiññyan
- Issue: Jaya Harivarman II
Names
- Ratnabhümivijaya / Sivänandana
Regnal name
- Śrī Jaya Harīvarmmadeva
- Father: Rudravarman IV

Jaya Harivarman I, known as his formal name Sivänandana, was a Phan Rang noble and King of Champa. Rising to power during the 12th Century Khmer–Cham wars, he spent much of his rule consolidating his control over Champa. He was succeeded by his son, Jaya Harivarman II.

== Biography ==
During the early to mid 12th century, the Kingdom of Champa and Khmer Empire intermittently warred over territory and influence in Southeast Asia. In 1145, Khmer king Suryavarman II invaded Champa, occupied the capital city of Vijaya, and deposed the Cham king, Jaya Indravarman III. The Khmer Empire also placed a puppet ruler, Harideva I, on the Cham throne and looted much of the country, including the temples at Mỹ Sơn.

Following the invasion, many Chams rose in revolt against the Khmer-supported king. During the revolt, Harivarman became the de facto leader of the rebel forces. In 1147, he defeated a Khmer army occupying Champa, forcing Suryavarman to send Khmer reinforcements to the kingdom; however, Suryavarman died between 1145 and 1150 (possibly while leading this second army in 1149), greatly weakening Khmer power in the region. In either 1149 or 1150, Harivarman and his forces defeated and killed Harideva I, with Harivarman being crowned as King Jaya Harivarman I soon after. As king, he forced the second Khmer expedition to retreat from Champa in 1150, though according to some sources the conflict against the Khmers continued until 1160.

Following his ascension to the throne, Harivarman I spent much of his rule consolidating his control over Champa. Facing threats from the Vietnamese kingdom of Đại Việt, he married his daughter to the Vietnamese ruler in 1152. In 1150 he defeated the combined army of Dai Viet lend troops and his rebelling brother-in-law Vamsaraja's forces at the Battle of Mỹ Sơn.

In addition to his military campaigns, Harivarman refurbished the temple complex at Po Nagar. In religious imagery, Harivarman depicted himself as an avatar of the semi-divine Cham ancestor Uroja, and claimed to be a reincarnation of four previous kings. Though he fought against the Khmer for many years, he hosted the future Khmer king Jayavarman VII while he was in exile.

Harivarman's rule ended, due to death or disappearance, in either 1162 or 1167. He was succeeded by his son, Jaya Harivarman II, who was quickly overthrown. After a succession crisis, Jaya Indravarman IV assumed the throne of Champa.

== See also ==
- Khmer–Cham wars

| Preceded by Rudravarman IV (absent) | King of Champa; 1147–1166 | Succeeded by Jaya Harivarman II 1166–1167 |
