= Battle of Mỹ Sơn =

1150 battle in the Khmer–Cham wars

- Part of Khmer–Cham wars
Date	1150
Location	Tonlé Sap
Result	Decisive Harivarman I victory Champa reconsolidated under Harivarman I

Belligerents
Champa	Vamsaraja and his loyalists, assisted by Dai Viet

Commanders and leaders
Jaya Harivarman I	Vamsaraja †

Strength
Unknown	5,000 Dai Viet troops, ~100,000 in total according to Cham sources

Casualties and losses
Unknown	"...died in great numbers"

During the climax of the Khmer–Cham wars, a battle had been fought between king Jaya Harivarman I of Champa against his rebelling brother-in-law Vamsaräja somewhere near Mỹ Sơn, Central Vietnam in 1150. After driving Khmer forces out of Vijaya in 1149, Harivarman spent years to reconquer other parts of the kingdom and consolidate the monarchy of Vijaya.

In 1150, in northern Champa, Vamsaräja rebelled against Harivarman. Vamsaräja gathered highland tribes: "Rade, Mada and other barbarians (Mlecch'a)" and attacked Harivarman, but was beaten.

Vamsaräja then requested aid from the ruler of Dai Viet, king Ly Anh Tong, who gave him 5,000 troops from Thanh Hóa, Nghệ An. According to Cham sources, "the king of the yvan, because he learned that the king of Cambodia created obstacles for Jaya Harivarman, proclaimed Vamsaräja, a man of Champa as king." With lend troops from Dai Viet, Vamsaräja marched his army totaling 100,000 and a thousand Viet senäpati to challenge Harivarman. They advanced to the plains of Dalvä and of Lavang. Harivarman gathered all of his royal troops in Vijaya to confront Vamsaräja in a pitched battle and fought them in a terrible combat, which Harivarman outmaneuvered his brother-in-law. Both Vamsaräja and the Vietnamese commander were killed in battle. In the following year, Harivarman subdued Amarävati (Quảng Ngãi province).
