= Tribhuvanāditya =

- King of the Khmer Empire
- Reign: 1167–1177
- Predecessor: Yasovarman II
- Successor: Jayavarman VII
- Died: 1177

Military service
- Allegiance: Khmer Empire
- Battles/wars: Khmer–Cham wars; Battle of Tonlé Sap †

Tribhuvanāditya was the ruler of the Khmer Empire from 1166 to 1177. He came to power after he assassinated Yasovarman II. He was a mandarin who, around 1165, overthrew Yasovarman II and proclaimed himself king of Cambodia. He ruled over many rebellions by Yasovarman's loyal supporters but managed to hold the throne until forces from the neighboring Champa empire under Jaya Indravarman III invaded and conquered his capital Angkor. Jaya Indravarman III was then killed.

In 1177 the Cham invasion, led by Jaya Indravarman IV, looted the Khmer capital, and rid the country of the usurper.

Regnal titles
Preceded by Yasovarman II	Emperor of Angkor; 1167–1177	Succeeded by Jayavarman VII
