= Vidyanandana =

Cham prince of Cambodia (died 1203)

Suryavarman of Champa
- pu po tana raya

King of Pāṇḍuraṅga (Khmer vassal)
- Reign: 1190–1191

King of Champa
- Reign: 1199–1203
- Predecessor: Jaya Indravarman IV
- Successor: Prince On Dhanapati (Khmer puppet)
- Born: Unknown
- Died: 1203; Dai Viet
Names
- Suryavarman; Prince (ciy) Vīdyānandana of Tumpraukvijaya
Regnal name
- Suryavarman
- Religion: Balamon; Tantric Buddhism

Vidyanandana, Shri Suryavarmadeva, or Suryavarman, was a Cham prince who served the Khmer Empire. He arrived in Khmer King Jayavarman VII's court in 1182 from Tumpraukvijaya, Champa, and was educated as a prince "in all branches of knowledge and all weapons". In the same year, he put down a revolt that broke out at Malyang against Jayavarman VII. In 1190 he took part in the war against Champa and seized the capital Vijaya, capturing King Jaya Indravarman IV. Adopting the title of Shri Suryavarmadeva, he made himself king of Panduranga. He made Prince In, a brother-in-law of Jayavarman VII, "King Suryajayavarmadeva in the Nagara of Vijaya" (or Suryajayavarman).

== Revolt against Cambodia ==
In 1191, Jaya Indravarman oṅ Vatuv summoned troops from Amaravati, Ulik, Vvyar, Jriy and Traik, deciding to revolt against Khmer rule. Indravarman oṅ Vatuv and his rebels drove Suryajayavarmadeva back to Cambodia, enthroning himself as Jaya Indravarman V. Vidyanandana/Suryavarman also then revolted against Cambodia. He assaulted Vijaya, killing Jaya Indravarman IV, and chased Jaya Indravarman V to Traik where Suryavarman captured Jaya Indravarman V and executed him, then "reigned without opposition over the Kingdom of Champa."

Suryavarman sent an embassy to the Dai Viet in 1194 and was recognized by emperor Lý Cao Tông in 1199. He resisted many attempts by Cambodia to dislodge him, until he was defeated by his paternal uncle, Yuvaraja Mnagahna On Dhanapati Grama. In 1203, he was expelled from Champa, sought refuge in Cửa Lò, but departed by sea, and disappeared without a trace.

From 1203 to 1220, Champa as a Khmer province was ruled by a puppet government. Following the dwindling Khmer military presence and voluntary Khmer evacuation of Champa in 1220, the Cham noble Angsaräja took over the reins of government peacefully, proclaiming himself Jaya Paramesvaravarman II, and restored Champa's independence.

== See also ==
- Khmer–Cham wars
