= Harivarman V =

King of Champa

- raja-di-raja

King of Champa
- Reign: 1114–1129
- Coronation: 1114
- Predecessor: Jaya Indravarman II
- Successor: Jaya Indravarman III
- Born: Indrapura, Champa
- Died: Indrapura, Champa
Names
- Sundaradeva
Regnal name
- Śrī Harivarmadeva

Harivarman V or Prince Sundaradeva (r. 1114–1129) was a king of Champa. Jaya Indravarman II (1071–1113) ruled thirty years without an heir. Harivarman, a nephew, was appointed as king of mandala Champa. His reign was peaceful; he sent diplomatic missions to the court of the Song dynasty in 1116 and 1120. He was enfeoffed as "Grand Master of the Palace with Golden Seal and Purple Ribbon" by the Chinese court, in response.

Harivarman made several donations and buildings to the sanctuaries at My Son.

Perhaps due to lack of suitable heirs to inherit him, Harivarman nominated his adopted son the title of Devaraja in 1129, the Crown Prince in 1133. In 1139 the Crown Prince ascended the throne with regnal name Jaya Indravarman III (r. 1139–1145).

== Bibliography ==
- Coedès, George (1975), Vella, Walter F. (ed.), The Indianized States of Southeast Asia, University of Hawaii Press, ISBN 978-0-824-80368-1
- Lafont, Pierre-Bernard (2007), Le Campā: Géographie, population, histoire, Indes savantes, ISBN 978-2-84654-162-6

Preceded by Jaya Indravarman II 1086–1113	King of Champa; 1114–1129	Succeeded by Jaya Indravarman III 1139–1145
