= Jaya Indravarman IV =

King of Champa (r. 1167–1192)

- raja-di-raja

King of Champa
- Reign: 1167–1192
- Predecessor: Jaya Harivarman II
- Successor: Vidyanandana
- Born: Unknown
- Died: 1192
- Spouse: Parameśvari; Rāya
- Issue: Princess Bhägyavatī; Princess Sumitrā; Princess Sudakṣiṇā
Names
- Jaya Indravarman of Grāmapura-vijaya
Regnal name
- Śrī Jaya Indravarmadeva
- Religion: Saivite Hinduism

Jaya Indravarman IV was the king of Champa, a former region located within modern-day Vietnam, from 1167–1192. He is noted for leading the Champa invasion of the Khmer Empire in 1177. He probably was the same person as Panduranga ruler, Po Klong Garai. A usurper, "he called himself Jaya Indravarman on Vatu and said he came from the 'famous place known by the name Gramapuravijaya." He was "full of energy, courage and pride...well versed in all the shastra." He sent tribute to the Court of China and the Dai Viet. Unsuccessful in purchasing horses from China for an overland invasion, he prepared a squadron of water vessels.

In 1177, his naval forces traveled up the Mekong and Tonle Sap rivers to Tonle Sap and sacked Angkor, killing Tribhuvanadityavarman. One of Indravarman IV's inscriptions erected in the Po Nagar temple dated to 1183 recounts how extravagant were the looting gold and silver treasures from the country of Kambu(ja) that were stacked on horse carts, carried to Champa, and were used to donate to the divine Lady Po Nagar by Queen Parameśvari, Queen Rāya, all of the king's Princess Bhägyavatī, Sumitrā, and Sudakṣiṇā, while the rest of the looted Khmer trophy were given to his people throughout the kingdom.

In 1190, the Khmer king Jayavarman VII, the son and successor of Dharanindravarman II, sought vengeance against Champa. The capital was taken by Vidyanandana and Indravarman was brought back to Cambodia as a prisoner. The King of Cambodia later released him in an attempt to regain is throne in 1191. However, Vidyanandana defeated him and had Jaya put to death.

He died in 1192. His name translates as Sanskrit Jaya, "victorious"; Indra "possessing drops of rain" from Sanskrit इन्दु (indu) "a drop" and र (ra) "possessing"; and Varman, Sanskrit for an expert in the martial arts. Indra is also the ancient Hindu warrior god of the sky and of rain. He is the chief god in the Hindu text the Rigveda.

Preceded by Jaya Harivarman II 1166–1167	King of Champa; 1167–1190	Succeeded by Vidyanandana 1190–1191
