= Jaya Indravarman III =

- raja-di-raja

King of Champa
- Reign: 1139–1145
- Coronation: 1139
- Predecessor: Harivarman V
- Successor: Rudravarman IV
- Born: 1106; Champa
- Died: 1145? Vijaya, Champa
Names
- Jaya Indravarman cei (Prince) Dav Veni Laskṃī Sinyāṅ urāṅ (of) Rupaṅ-vijaya
Regnal name
- Jaya Indravarman
- Father: Harivarman V (adopted)
- Mother: ?
- Religion: Hinduism

Jaya Indravarman III (c. 1106–1145, r. 1139–1145) was a king of Champa during the middle of the 12th century.

Harivarman V was an heirless king, so he abdicated in 1129. His adopted son, Jaya Indravarman III, was nominated for the Crown Prince of Champa in 1133. In 1131 he was convinced by Angkor ruler Suryavarman II to attack Dai Viet, seizing three provinces in 1132. In 1139, he ascended as king of mandala Champa. Not so much information was known about his ruling years, but he left elaboration in Thap Mam style in Binh Dinh, building temples and endowments at My Son sanctuaries in Quang Nam in 1140, and made a eulogy for Lady Po Yang Ino Nagar at the Po Nagar temple in Nha Trang three years later.

Because Indravarman had facilitated a peace deal with the Dai Viet and refused to join with Khmer Empire's wasteful campaigns against Dai Viet, the Khmer chose to invade his kingdom instead. In 1145, Suryavarman II led an invasion of Champa, which unlike his previous disastrous campaigns, that one was a success. The Khmer army captured the Cham capital of Vijaya, ransacking it, and destroyed temples at My Son. The Khmer Empire had undermined the Cham king, and deposed him.

Indravarman disappeared amidst the chaos of war, either killed or captured by the Khmer, as Maspero anticipates.

== Bibliography ==
- Coedès, George (1975), Vella, Walter F. (ed.), The Indianized States of Southeast Asia, University of Hawaii Press, ISBN 978-0-824-80368-1
- Lafont, Pierre-Bernard (2007), Le Campā: Géographie, population, histoire, Indes savantes, ISBN 978-2-84654-162-6
- Maspero, Georges (2002), The Champa Kingdom, White Lotus Co., Ltd, ISBN 978-97475-3-499-3

Preceded by Harivarman V 1113–1129	King of Champa; 1139–1145	Succeeded by None (Khmer occupation)
