= Mỹ Sơn =

- Commune
- Mountains in Mỹ Sơn commune
- Interactive map of Mỹ Sơn
- Coordinates: 11.67190358019626°N 108.86367361408807°E
- Country: Vietnam
- Region: South Central Coast and Central Highlands
- Province: Khánh Hòa
- Administrative headquarters: National Route 27

Area
  - Total: 248.06 km^{2} (95.78 sq mi)

Population (31 December 2024)
  - Total: 15,800
  - Density: 63/km^{2} (160/sq mi)

Mỹ Sơn is a commune in Khánh Hòa province, Vietnam.

On 16 June 2025, the Standing Committee of the National Assembly of Vietnam issued Resolution No. 1667/NQ-UBTVQH15 on the arrangement of commune-level administrative units in Khánh Hòa province in 2025. Under the resolution, the entire area and population of Phước Trung commune, formerly part of Bác Ái district, and Mỹ Sơn commune, formerly part of Ninh Sơn district, were merged to form a new commune named Mỹ Sơn.
