= Phan Rang =

- Ward
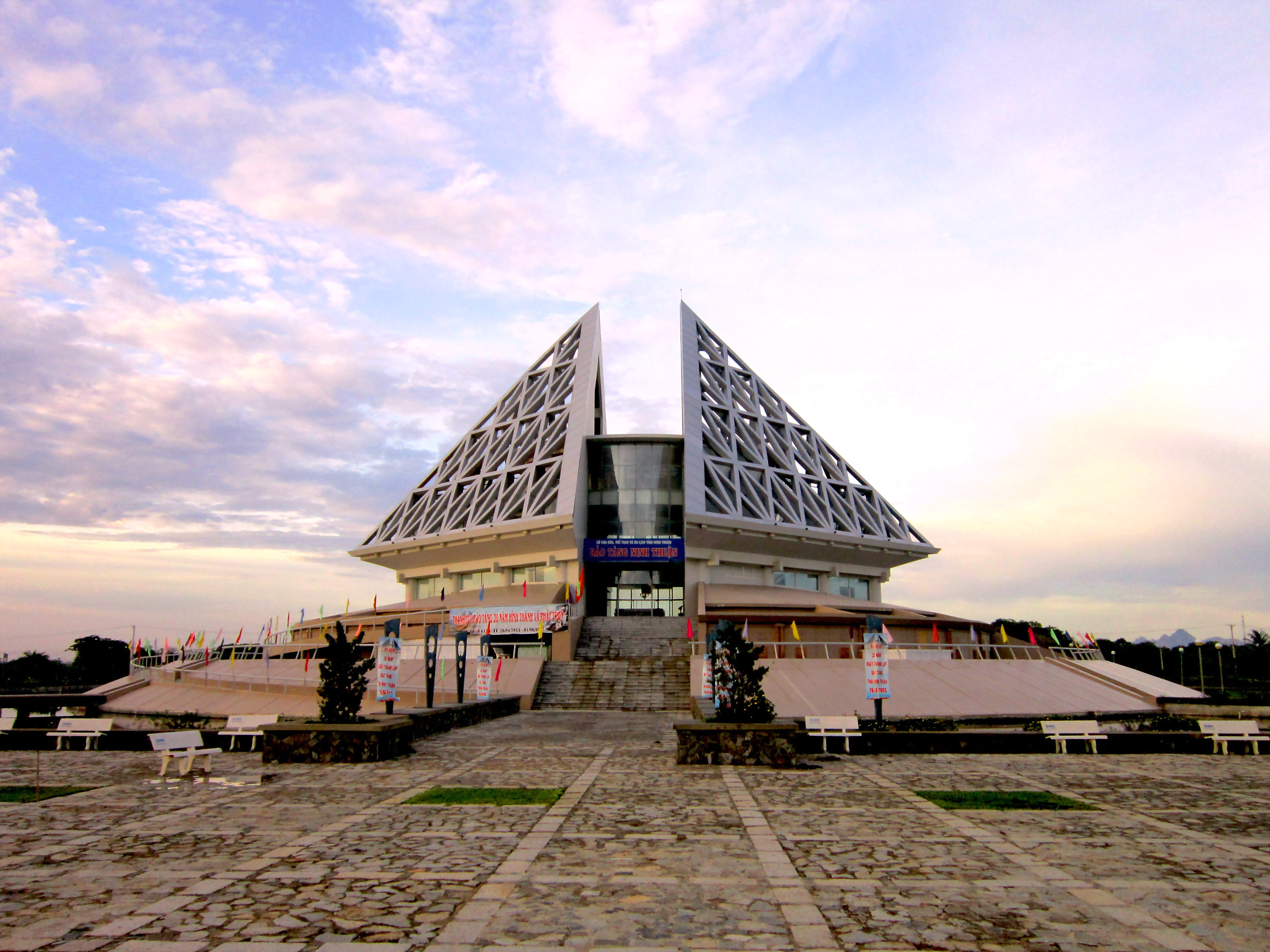
- Khánh Hòa Provincial Museum (formerly Ninh Thuận Provincial Museum)
- Interactive map of Phan Rang
- Coordinates: 11.568022366934475°N 108.98935370427965°E
- Country: Vietnam
- Region: South Central Coast and Central Highlands
- Province: Khánh Hòa
- Established: 16 June 2025
- Administrative headquarters: 6A 21/8 Street

Area
  - Total: 9.41 km^{2} (3.63 sq mi)

Population (31 December 2024)
  - Total: 72,250
  - Density: 7,678/km^{2} (19,890/sq mi)
- Website: phanrang.khanhhoa.gov.vn

Phan Rang is a ward in Khánh Hòa province, Vietnam.

On 16 June 2025, the Standing Committee of the National Assembly of Vietnam issued Resolution No. 1667/NQ-UBTVQH15 on the arrangement of commune-level administrative units in Khánh Hòa province in 2025. Under the resolution, the entire area and population of Kinh Dinh, Phủ Hà, Đài Sơn, and Đạo Long wards, formerly part of Phan Rang–Tháp Chàm, were merged to form a new ward named Phan Rang.
