= Georges Gimel =

French painter

Georges Gimel (March 8, 1898 – January 21, 1962), was a French expressionist painter of portraits, landscapes, mountain landscapes, still lifes and flowers. He was also a wood carver, lithographer, illustrator, set designer, sculptor, and enamel painter.

== Biography ==
Gimel was born at Domène (Isère), France. He lived at Domène and at Grenoble, where he studied at the École des Arts Industriels, until the age of 16 at which time he moved to Paris. Gimel stayed in Paris for 20 years; thereafter he split his time between Megève, Annecy, Grenoble and Paris. He took part in both the First World War and the Second World War.

In 1916 he studied at the École des Beaux-Arts of Paris, at the Studio of Jean-Paul Laurens and at the École des Arts Décoratifs. After the war in 1919 he returned at the École des Beaux Arts, at the Studio of Jean-Antoine Injalbert. At the same time, he became a pupil of the Académie Julian and also worked together with the sculptor Henri Bouchard, a friend from the war.

Gimel was the artistic director of the literary review Tentatives with Henri Petiot (Daniel Rops) for a special edition dedicated to Stendhal. He created numerous wood carvings, including a portrait of Déodat de Séverac that was owned by the Bibliothèque Nationale de Paris.

He took part in the Salon d'Automne and the Salon des Indépendants from 1921 until 1934. Gimel created the largest painting of the Salon d’Automne in 1927, entitled La cueillette des amandes.

His talent was noticed very early on by Andry-Farcy, curator of the Museum of Grenoble, who supported the “Peintres Modernes”, and by the art critic Félix Fénéon.

Gimel's lithographs sought after by collectors are composed of up to 14 colors. He also worked on various works of portraiture as painting: winter landscapes, bathers, sports figures, flowers and marines. An artistic dynamo, he linked the schools of beaux arts and commercial/artistic design by creating fabric designs for clothing designers Paul Poiret and Jean Patou.

In Paris, he gained worldwide recognition through numerous exhibitions at art galleries including: Galerie Bernheim-Jeune, Galerie Bignou, Galerie Kleinmann, Galerie Berri-Raspail, Galerie Charpentier, and Galerie Katia Granoff.

In 1930, Gimel began to create immense frescoes such as the one at the principal office of the Société des Chaux et Ciment Lafarge a Paris. In 1931, he married Madeleine Louise Jeannest at the Vésinet near Paris.

In 1933, Gimel created a Station of the Cross which was controversial because of its modernism. In January 1934, his religious frescoes were exhibited at the Galerie Jean Charpentier, together with the lithographs for the Station of the Cross with an introduction by Léon Daudet in the Editions Jeanne Bucher. One of these works was later acquired by the Vatican and another by the Bibliothèque Nationale of Paris. Gimel's work belongs to the school of religious art led by George Desvallières and Maurice Denis.

When architect Henry Jacques Le Même designed his chalet "La Fresque" at Megève, Gimel decorated the façades with avant-garde frescoes.

In 1937, Gimel took part in the Exposition Universelle de Paris, and there he created the interior design for the Pavillon du Dauphiné.

At the end of World War II in 1944, Gimel published a book of pen and ink drawings of war scenes, entitled Le Calvaire de la Résistance. Some of the drawings had been exhibited at the Galerie Katia Granoff in Paris in April 1940.

Following this, he devoted himself to his art and to the making of his enamels where his genius allowed him to combine technical and practical aspects to create an indestructible form of enamel painting. In 1949, he exhibited 91 enamel works at the Art Gallery Bernheim Jeune in Paris. Later, thanks to the Ministère des Affaires Etrangères, several of his enamels were sent abroad to Rome (Italy) and Saarbrücken (Germany), while others were part of a traveling exhibition in the United States that started at the Yale University Art Gallery in 1954.

In 1956, Gimel created his Stations of the Cross in enamel for the church Jean-Baptiste at Megève. He was also asked by the Rotary-club des Alpes de Haute-Provence for a major conference on the subject of enamels, assisted by his friend Jean Giono.

On January 21, 1962, a sunny Sunday, Gimel died suddenly while ice skating with a young woman at the skating rink at Megève (Haute-Savoie).

== Illustrated works ==
- Dévigne, Roger (1921), Janot le jeune hommes aux ailes d'or. Paris: L'Encrier.
- Cœuroy, André (1921), Musiciens. Paris: Nouvel Essor.
- Faure, Gabriel (1922), Printemps. Paris: R.Chiberre.
- Voragine, Jacques de (1922), Sainte Agnès. Paris: Nouvel Essor.
- Hervieu, Louise (1924), l'Âme du cirque. Paris: Librairie de France.
- Gimel, Georges en Petiot, Henry (1924), Stendhal. Chambéry: Tentatives.
- Gimel, Georges (1933), Chemin de Croix. Paris: Jeanne Bucher.
- Gimel, Georges (1944), Le Calvaire de la Résistance. Grenoble: Didier et Richard.

== Bibliography ==
- Hans Vollmer, Allgemeines Lexikon der Bildenden Künstler des XX jahrhunderts p. 248.
- Bénézit, Dictionnaire des peintres..., t.V, p. 7.
- Edouard-Joseph, Dictionnaire biographique des artistes contemporains, 1910–1930.
- François-Georges Marlin Gimel, Alain Warmé, (2005), Gimel 1898–1962. Annecy: Doc'Factory. ISBN 2-9524879-0-1
