= Picasso. In the heart of darkness (1939–1945) =

Temporary exhibition by the museum of Grenoble (2019 - 2020)

Picasso. In the heart of darkness (1939–1945) was an exhibition presented October 5, 2019 through January 5, 2020, at the Musee de Grenoble. Presented with the help of the Musée Picasso, the Centre Pompidou, and the Kunstsammlung Nordrhein-Westfalen, it was the first exhibition in France featuring the creative process of Pablo Picasso during the Second World War.

A total of 100,274 visitors attended the exhibition.

== Context ==
The Musée de Grenoble organized their first exhibition of Picasso's paintings which was the first modern art museum in France to welcome a piece by Picasso (Femme lisant, in 1921). On October 19, 1926, Picasso visited the museum.

This exhibition coincided with one devoted to Andry-Farcy ending on November 24, 2019, celebrating the hundredth anniversary of his assumption of office as curator at the Musée de Grenoble. Farcy launched the modern art collection in Grenoble in 1920 and paved the way for all other museums in Europe.

== Visit route ==
The 137 works (paintings, sculptures, drawings, engravings) are presented in chronological order from year to year throughout the 16 rooms. During the war, Picasso chose to stay in France and devoted himself to three classic themes: still lifes, the female nude, and the portrait. One of the first works is Chat saissant un oiseau (Cat seizing a bird) from April 22, 1939, illustrating the fear of the painter faced with the threat of a war in Europe with the capture of Prague by the Nazis.

Each year begins with a giant historical photograph linked to current events. For the year 1940, Picasso traveled between Royans and Paris where he painted disturbing paintings of toothed fish, such as Café à Royans in August 1940. Without painting the war, he would represent violence in his paintings. In 1941, while Picasso and his companion Dora remained in a Paris subject to restrictions, he painted Jeune garçon à la langouste (Young boy with lobster), thus defying the Nazi occupier. That same year, he painted his companion in the paintings Buste de femme (Bust of a woman) and Femme assise dans un fauteil (Woman seated in an armchair). In 1942, still in his workshop in the Grands-Augustins, he produced a sculpture of a painted bronze head but also his paintings L'Aubade and Nature morte au crane de taureau (Still Life with the Skull of a Bull), a tribute to his friend Julio González who had recently died. This last painting serves as a poster for the exhibition.

== Media ==
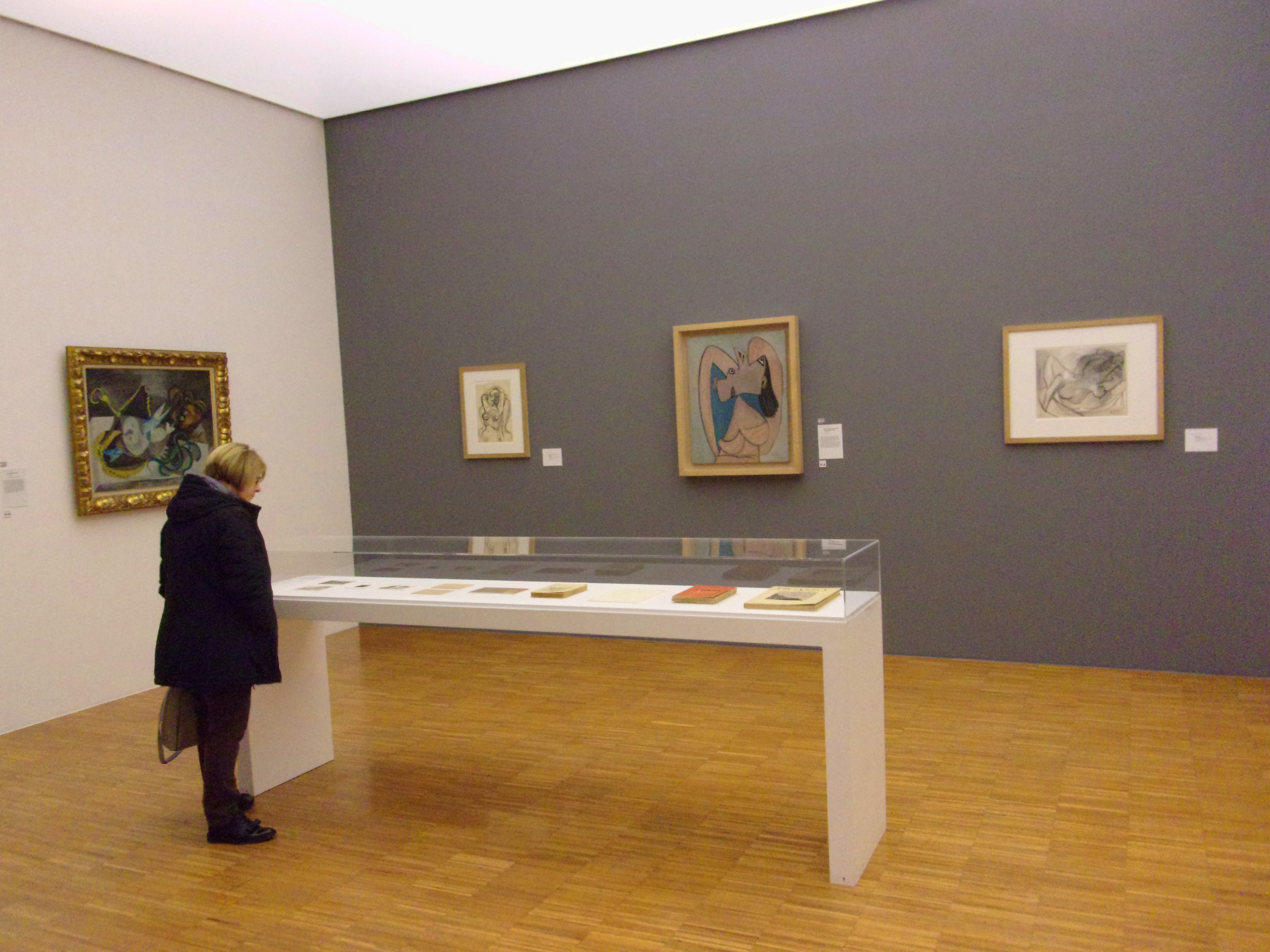

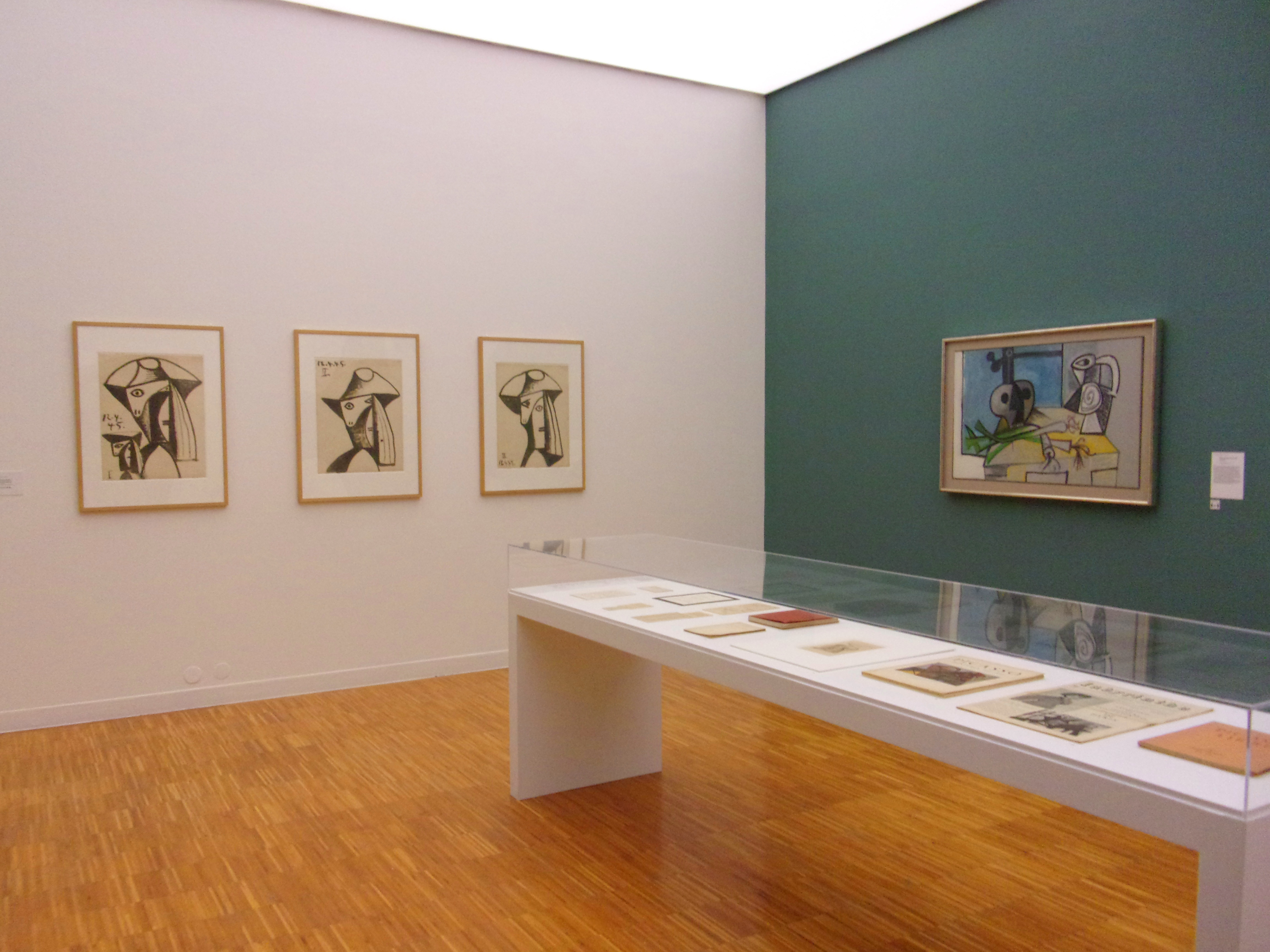

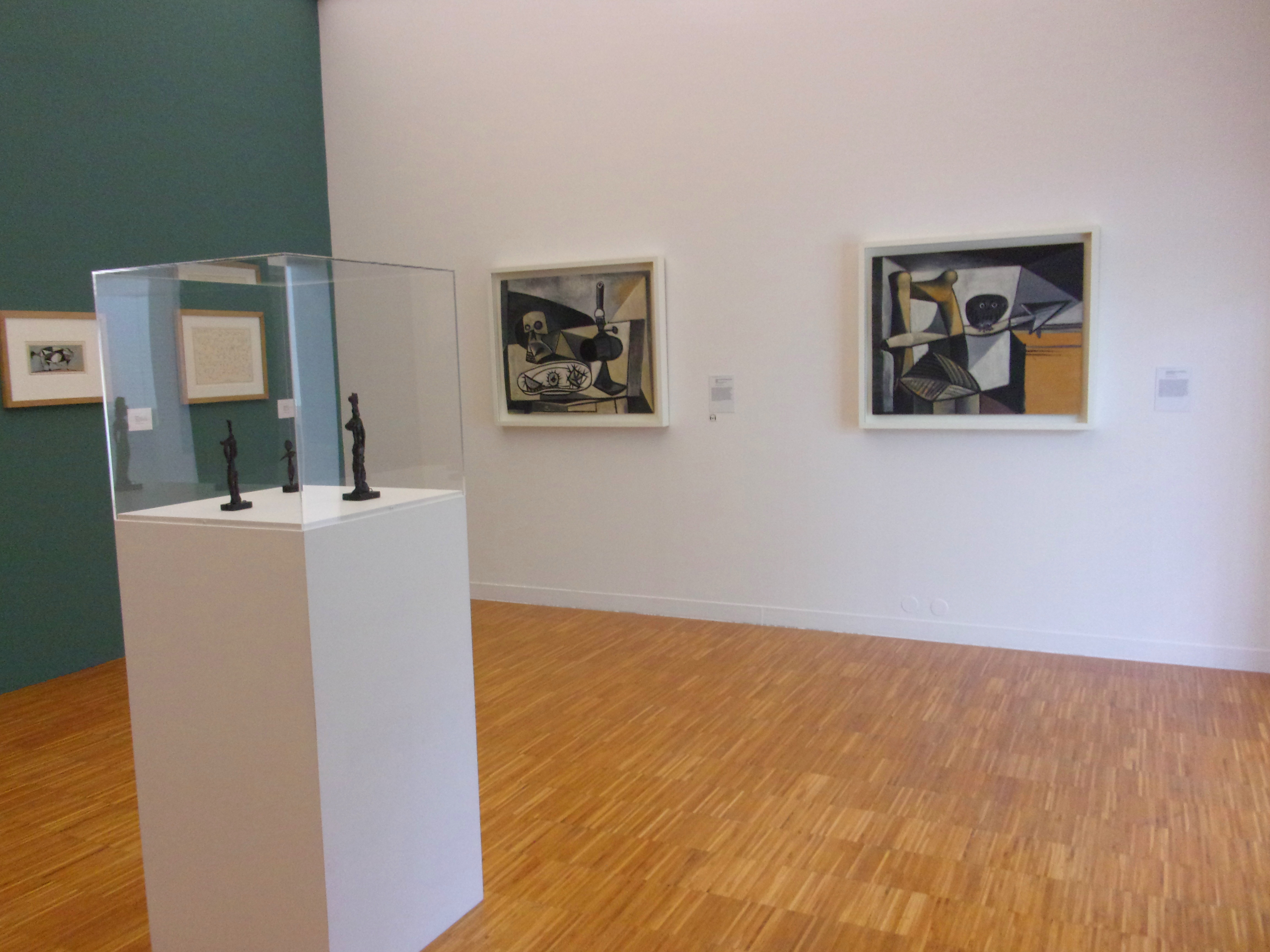

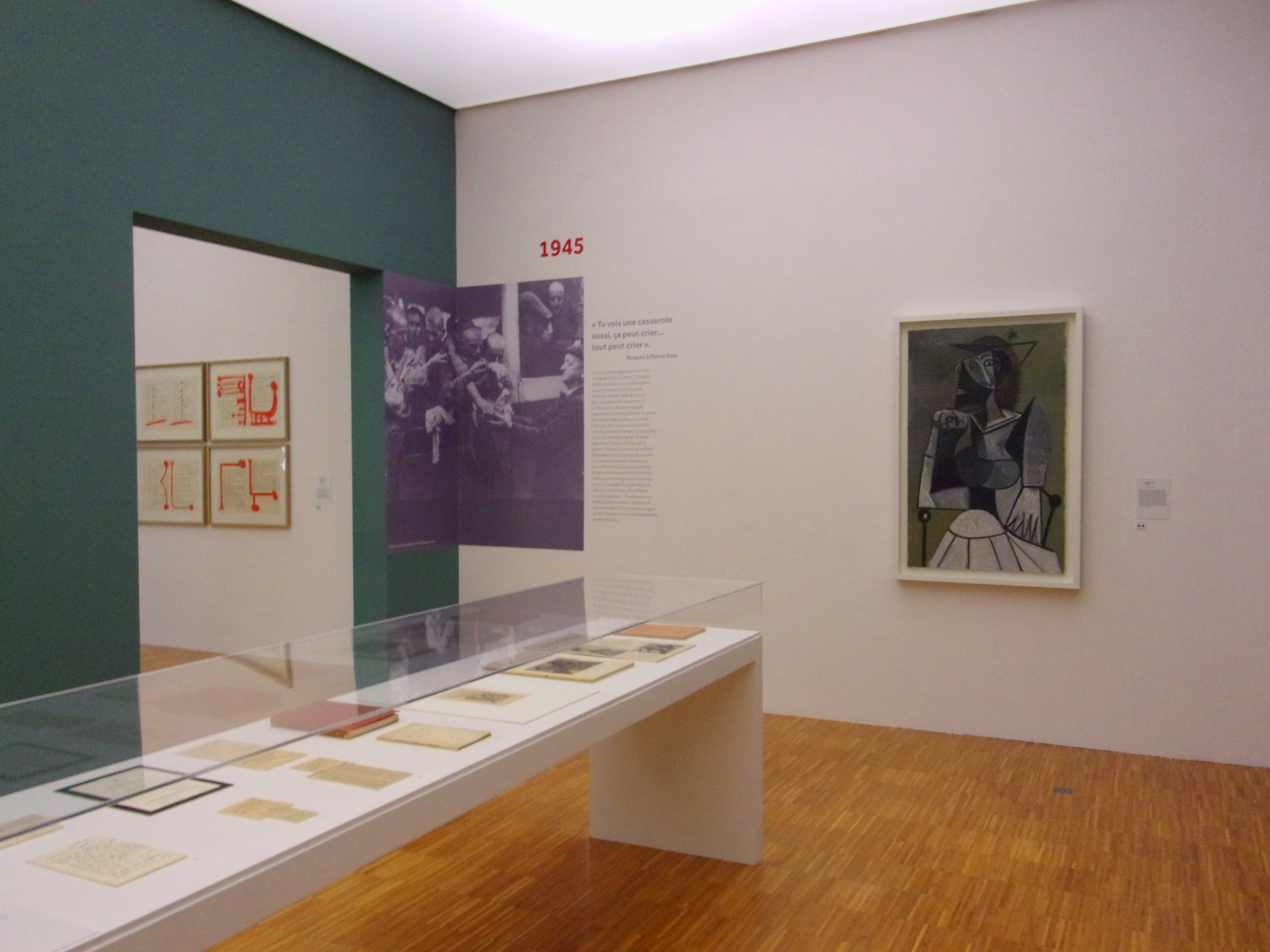

== See also ==
=== Bibliography ===
Exhibition catalogue:

- Collectif (October 2019). Picasso. Au coeur des ténèbres (1939-1945). Paris: In Fine Éditions d'art. p. 320. ISBN 978-290230242-0.

=== Related articles ===
- List of Picasso artworks 1931–1940
- List of Picasso artworks 1941–1950
