= Museum of Grenoble =

Museum in Grenoble, Isère, France

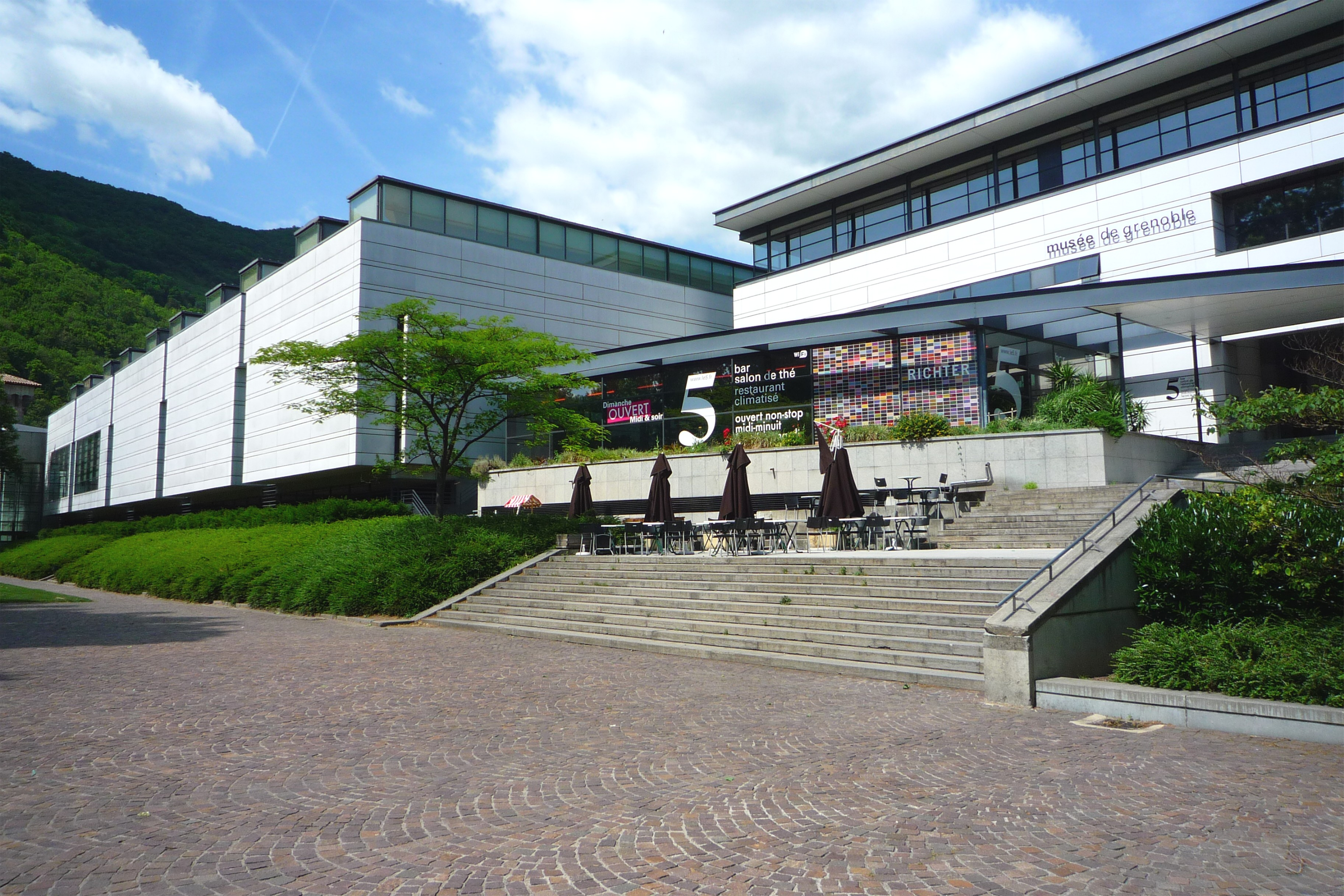
- Interactive fullscreen map
- Established: 1798
- Location: 5 place Lavalette 38000 Grenoble
- Coordinates: 45.1945°N 5.7324°E
- Type: Art museum,
- Visitors: 176,457 (2012)
- Curator: Guy Tosatto
- Public transit access: Tramway B (Notre-dame-Musée), and bus line 32
- Website: www.museedegrenoble.fr

The Museum of Grenoble (French: Musée de Grenoble) is a municipal museum of Fine Arts and antiquities in the city of Grenoble in the Isère region of France.

Located on the left bank of the Isère River, place Lavalette, it is known both for its collections of ancient art and for its collections of modern and contemporary art. Thanks to the action of Andry-Farcy, one of its curators in the interwar period, it is considered the very best museum of modern art in France.

Its temporary rooms allow it to organize two exhibitions each year.

== History ==
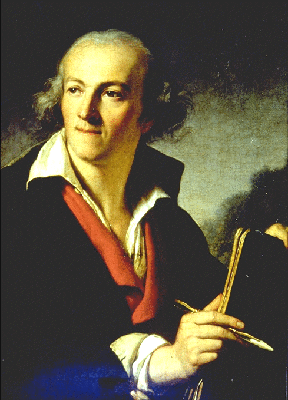
Louis-Joseph Jay

The Museum of Grenoble was founded on 16 February 1798 by Louis-Joseph Jay, well before other French provincial museums. That day, an order of the local administration detailed the creation of a museum in Grenoble, in which article 10 stipulated that « the citizen Louis-Joseph Jay is appointed curator of this museum. »

In May of that year, the Interior Minister canceled the creation of the museum but a provisional authorization was obtained in December, which became final on 3 April 1800. Beginning in 1799, while engaged in collecting works of art of the Isère Region, Jay requested a public subscription to purchase paintings and drawings.

Housed in four halls of the first floor of the former bishopric from its opening on 31 December 1800, the museum had 298 works of art including 177 paintings, 80 drawings or engravings and 45 sculptures placed in the garden. Each hall had a name, the first Hall of Apollo, was devoted to French painters, the second Hall of Castor and Pollux, was devoted to Italian and French schools, the third Salon of Gladiator, had copies of the life of San Bruno by Eustache Lesueur, and the last hall was called Hall of the Venus de Medici, displaying the art of the Flemish school. A few months after its opening, the Concordat of 1801 by Napoleon Bonaparte forced the evacuation of the premises of the museum to restore them to their original purpose.

So in this way it was relocated on 14 July 1802, into the Central School, which is currently the Stendhall School (Lycée Stendhal). On 12 March 1807, a decree transformed the museum from a county museum into a municipal museum. On 15 February 1811, an imperial decree allocated 209 paintings to six French cities and gave 32 to Grenoble.

In 1815, despite a partial dispersion of works as a result of the Restoration, (57 paintings were returned to their owners, 11 disappeared and an unknown number were deposited in the churches) the collection continued to increase. The acquisitions, donations and legacies continued throughout the 19th century, and made it essential to construct a new building despite there having been a building expansion in 1844.

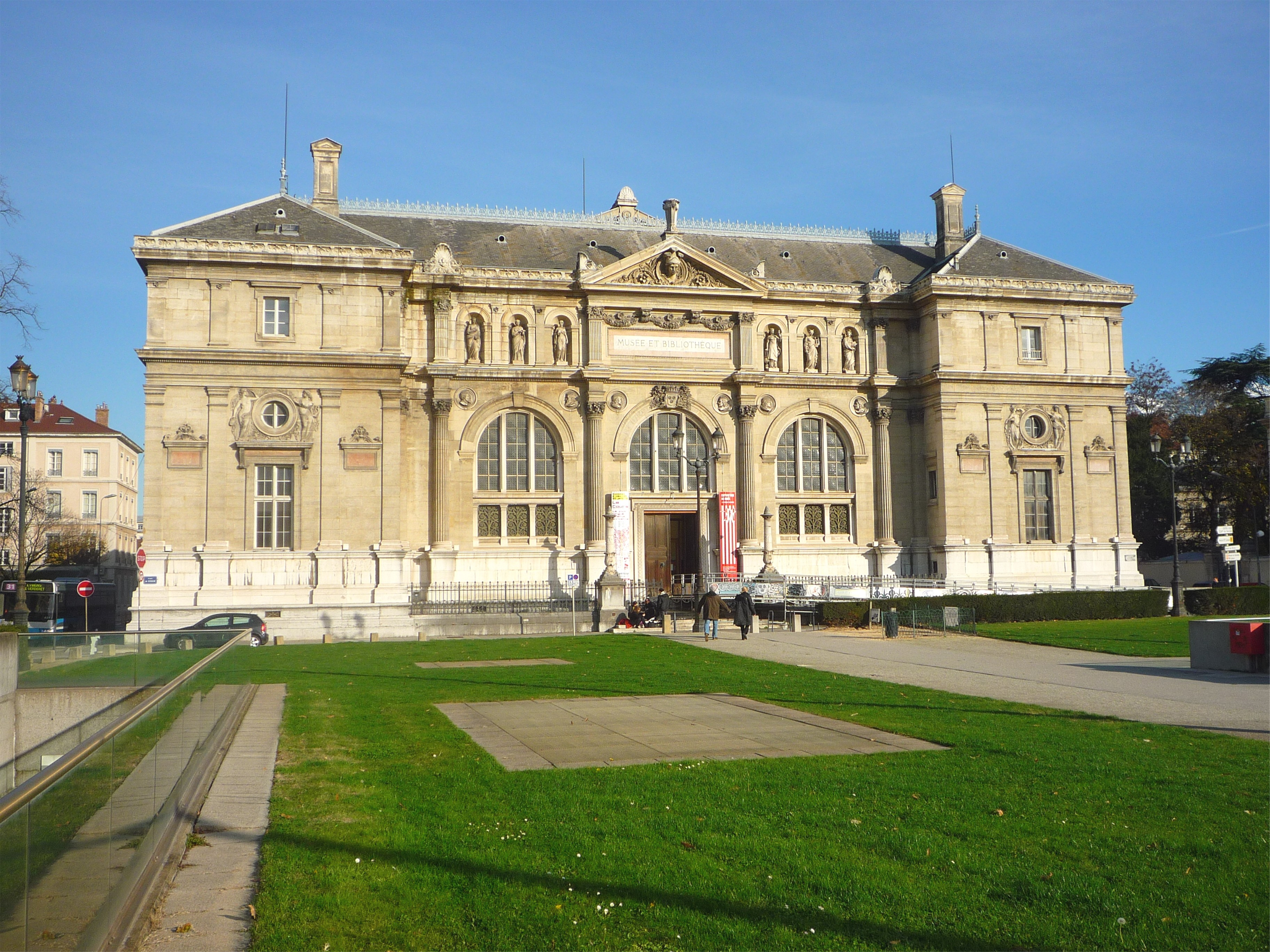
Former museum-library.

A new building designed by the architect Charles-Auguste Questel was inaugurated in 1870, on the current site of Verdun Square. The museum-library, so called because it also housed the Municipal Library of Grenoble, is one of the great examples of museum architecture in France and Europe.

Towards the end of the 19th century, a major patron, General Leon de Beylié added to the museum's collection by donating four famous paintings by Francisco de Zurbarán, continuing a long tradition of donations and bequests. De Beylié had a direct and massive influence on the wealth and the nature of the collections. From 1895 until his accidental death on 15 July 1910, he bought for the museum 50 paintings, 13 drawings, 16 sculptures, 13 pieces of archeology and hundreds of objects from the Far East.

From 1920 to the early-1950s, the Museum of Grenoble was considered the premier museum of contemporary art in France, since the Paris museum did not open until 1947. It was even one of the first museums in the world, together with the Folkwang Museum in Essen (Germany) and the Muzeum Sztuki in Łódź (Poland), as well as the Museum of Modern Art in New York which did not open until 1929.

In 1982, President François Mitterrand announced a plan to construct a new building. The following year, the new mayor of Grenoble Alain Carignon, and the Minister of Culture Jack Lang, agreed on the idea and on the site of the new building, on a parking lot near the centre of town. After the selection of architects in 1987, construction began in 1990.

On January 30, 1994, the new building housing the collections was inaugurated by Prime Minister Édouard Balladur. Located in the heart of the city, bordering the Isère River, it tripled the exhibition space of the old museum. Its total cost was 203 million French francs (31 million euros). To complete the Museum there is a sculpture garden in the Albert Michallon park, a wooded area of 16,000 m^{2} surrounding the old city wall from the late 19th century.

== History of the location of the new museum ==
The current location of the museum was occupied since the 13th century by the great monastery of the Brothers Minor, known in France as the Cordeliers or Franciscans until they moved to the current Berulle Square in 1592. Integrated into the city in the 13th century by an extension of the Roman wall, the place was at the eastern extremity of the town and remained so until the 19th century, while different generations of fortifications were built over the centuries.

Thus was built the Tower of the Island in 1401, serving as a defence system that allowed relative autonomy for the consuls of the city who considered it to be their main "home City". In 1591, the future Duke of Lesdiguieres, who came to take possession of the city during the religious wars, built a new fortified wall, turning the place into a small fortress called Arsenal to protect himself from any rebellion of the inhabitants. In this way the area became the first barracks in the history of the city.

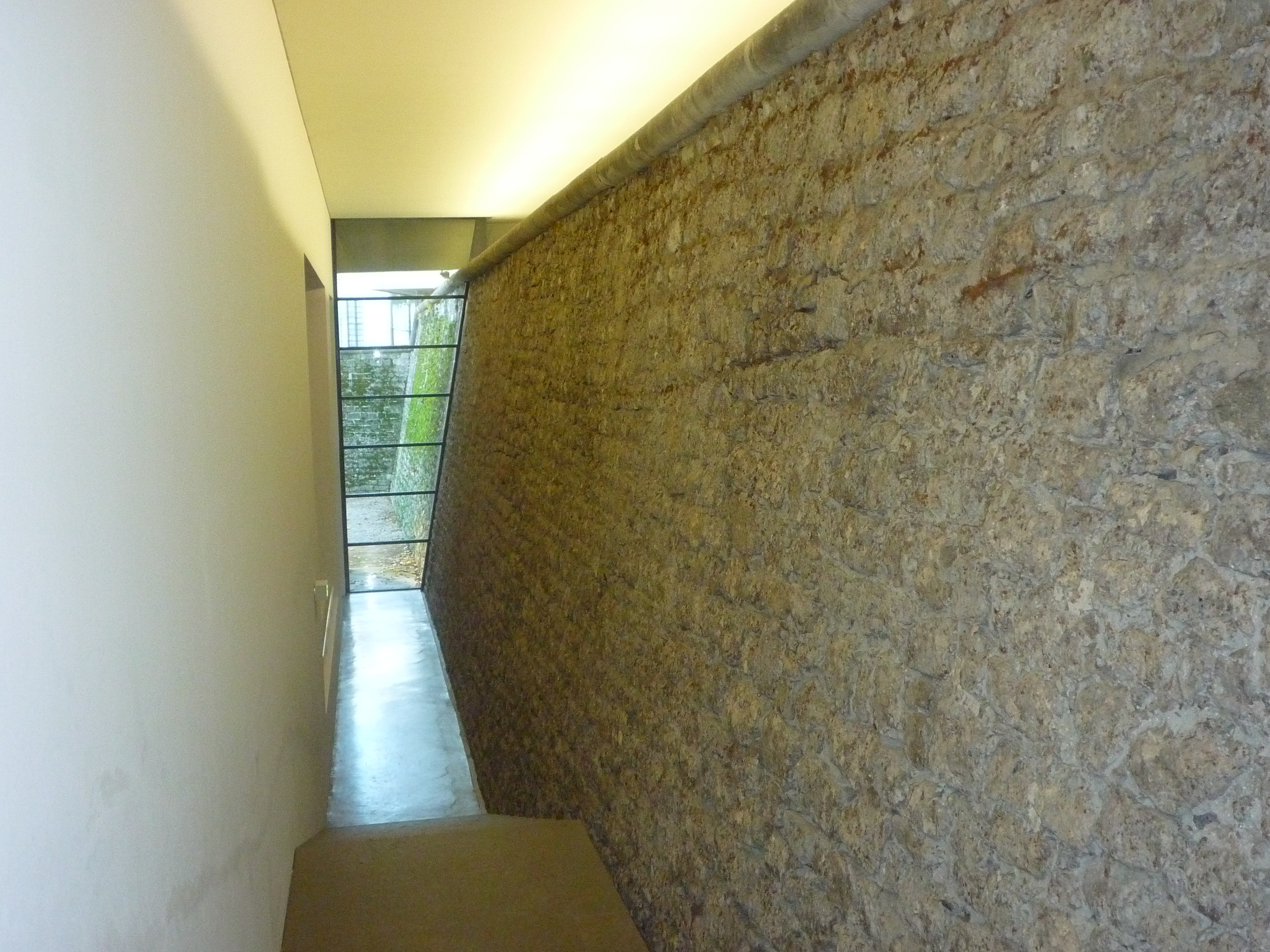
The 1888 Wall in the museum

In the 19th century, General Haxo enlarged the precincts of the city from 1832 to 1836 by building a new fortification wall close to the Arsenal. Historically a place of military occupation, the area was occupied during the 19th century by several barracks of which Vinoy barracks was on the site of the museum and the Bizanet barracks was opposite.

Around 1888, a change was made to the Haxo wall. At the urging of the mayor, Edouard Rey, and the population, the engineer created a new gate, the Gate of Saulaie to serve the new district of Green Island. This new gate obliged the military for technical reasons to correct the path of the Haxo wall, building a new line of wall square to the old wall down to the edge of the Isère River at the site of an old Ravelin fortification. This new wall of 150 linear meters has been preserved from the sculpture garden to the football field then going through part of the structure of the Museum. In 1967 the Vinoy barracks were demolished, leaving room for a large parking lot.

== Architecture building ==
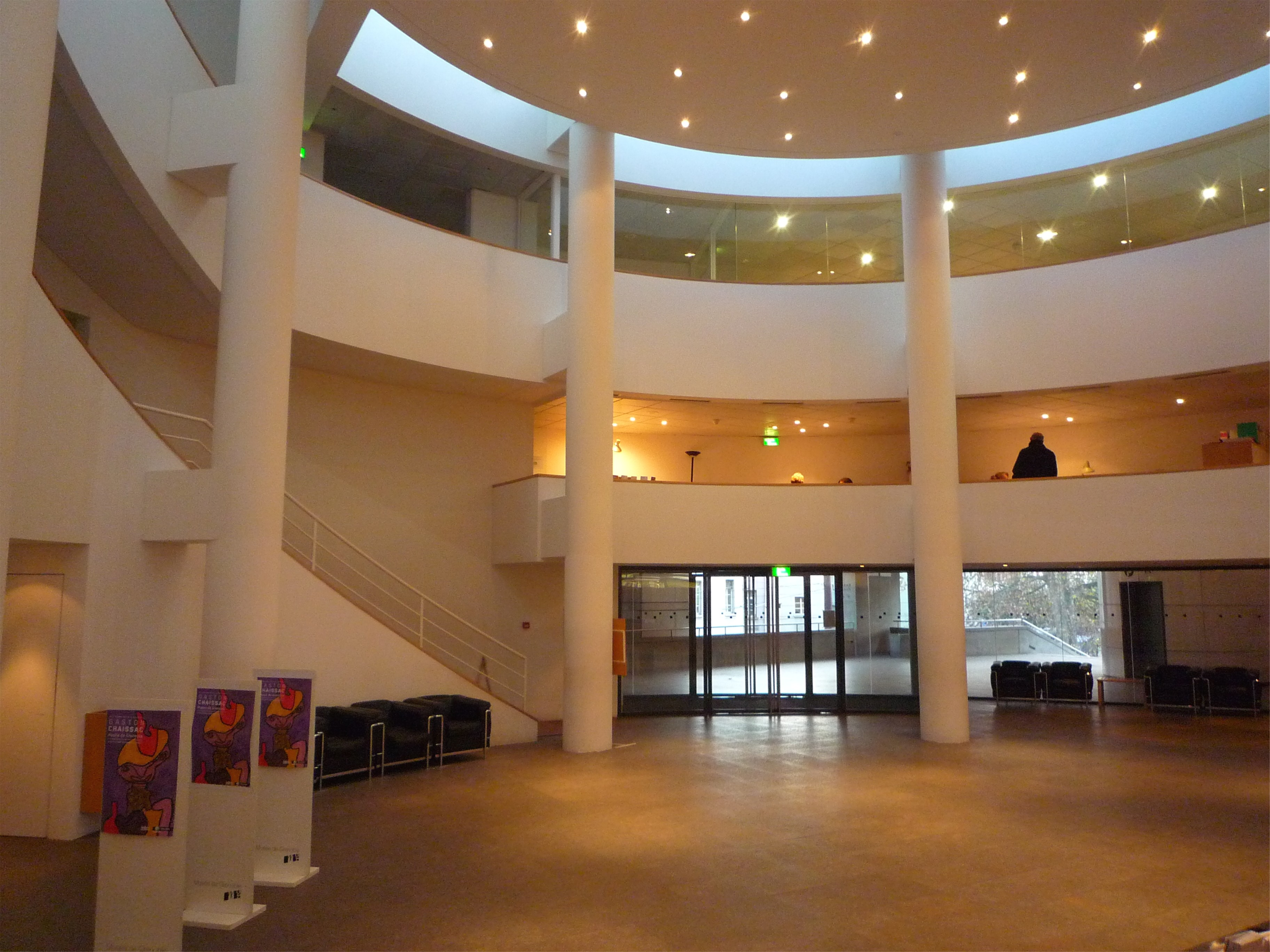
Lobby of the museum

The present building of 18,270 sq.m. was inaugurated in 1994 as part of a program of large works in the province initiated in 1982. It was designed by architects Olivier Félix-Faure, Antoine Félix-Faure and Philippe Macary from the architectural firm from Grenoble Groupe6, assisted by museographer Lorenzo Piqueras.

On the site there were severe design constraints. The imperatives were in respect to the immediate vicinity of the site. To the North-west a part of the Lesdiguieres wall dating from 1591 are recorded as being historical monuments. Nearby, the Tower of the Island dating from 1401, is also a register structure. To the east, the modified part of the wall built around 1888 must be conserved, forcing the integration of part of it inside the building. Finally to the east, access to a football stadium must to be retained during the development of the structure for an area with high urban population density.

The museum is built over a huge parking lot on three levels keeping it safe from flooding from the Isère River. For the exhibition areas, the museum itself is built on three levels, but most of the display halls are located at level 0. At this level, the halls are served by a wide central aisle. On the left are the five sequences of ancient art, on the right are temporary exhibitions. The end of the aisle has been left empty of any work, in an arc, this huge area is dedicated to the 20th century, and also gives access to the Tower of the Island.

Levels -1 and -2 are smaller floors, and thus have a limited number of rooms. Their lighting is no longer an overhead light useful for study as in the halls of level 0. At level-1 has installed after the lobby, three rooms of Greek, Etruscan and Egyptian antiquities, and at the other end of the building, four rooms covering art at the end of the 20th century (after 1960). Below, level-2 has six rooms for the 21st century. It is also at this level that leads to the spectacular integration of the end of the 19th century wall into this futuristic building.

A few metres from the building, the museum features via a skywalk of glass and steel, the Tower of the Island, transforming it into a place of exhibition graphics. The architecture also incorporates the district football stadium into the complex.

Inside, the transitions between levels are equipped with wide ramps and three lifts to travel between floors. The rooms are designed to rest the eye: uniform wooden floors, white walls, etc.

Around the cylindrical entry hall, are the reception counter, library, shop, and cafeteria. Upstairs museum offices, as well as those of the Association of Friends of the Museum, the Association of Museum in Music, which organizes concerts in an auditorium of 275 seats in partnership with The Louvre and finally the André Chastel library equipped with a specialized collection of 55,000 art history books available to consult on site.

== Museum curators ==
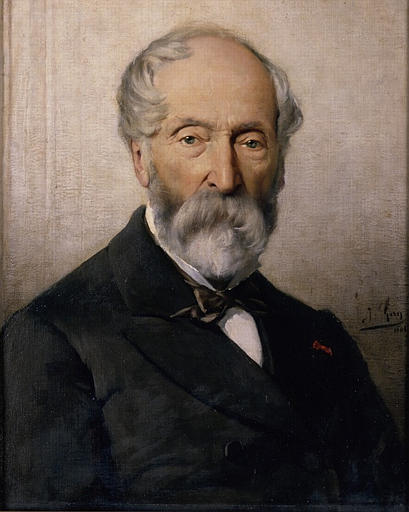
Alexandre Debelle, curator from 1853 to 1887. Portrait by Jacques Gay

Two Curators have made a special mark on the history of the museum: Louis-Joseph Jay and Andry-Farcy. The first created and ensured the implementation of the museum from 1798 to 1815, before leaving the estate to Benjamin Rolland. Painters Alexandre Debelle and Jules Bernard ensured the succession as preservationists.

Then during the 20th century, there were Xavier Borgey and in particular Pierre André Farcy, called Andry-Farcy, curator from 1919 to 1949, who decisively guided the museum in favour of the collection of modern art. He left but agreed to come back in exchange for the promise of displaying a number of contemporary works by Matisse, Picasso and Monnet beside some of the great works of the museum. This caused a violent press campaign against him. His opponents would come to name his art gallery, the "rigolarium" [comedy house]. His successors were Jean Leymarie, Gabrielle Kueny, Maurice Besset, Marie-Claude Beaud, Pierre Gaudibert, Hélène Vincent (Temporary for 2 years), Serge Lemoine, Guy Tosatto, and since 2024 Sebastien Gokalp.

== Attendance ==
Overall, the average annual museum attendance in the 2000s was 180,000 visitors.

Evolution of the number of visitors
2000	2001	2002	2003	2004	2005	2006	2007	2008
137 506	137 942	134 033	160 282	133 407	140 835	167 035	192 634	187 715
11,3 %	+ 0,3 %	2,8 %	+ 19,6 %	-16,7 %	+ 5,5 %	+ 18,6 %	+ 15,3 %	2,5 %

== Collections ==
The museum offers the possibility of following without interruption western history from the 13th to the 21st century, with each period represented by first rank works of art. Less known to the general public, as a parenthesis to the main course, there is a collection of 115 African statues and artifacts are in the aisle between the 19th and the 20th century. The visitor has the opportunity to use an audio guide for a fee that allows him to view the collections at his own pace. The commentaries are recorded by actors and are short and lively. The permanent collections altogether consist of 1,500 works in 57 rooms of 14,000 m^{2} which are grouped as follows:

=== Ancient Egyptian, Greek and Roman ===
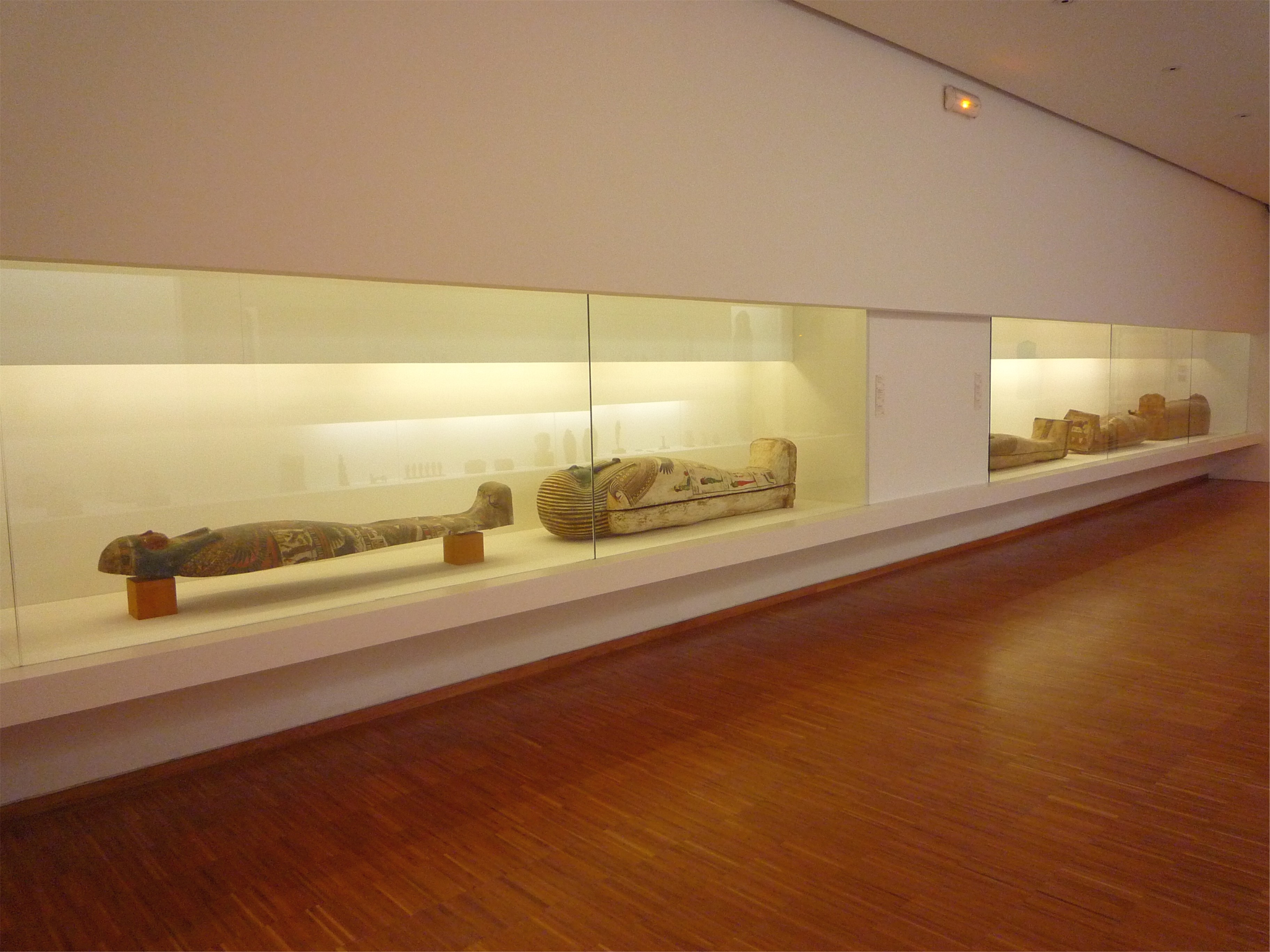
Room 59. Sarcophagi Egyptology section

Two rooms are located off the lobby, the level-1 is devoted to antiquities from ancient Egypt, with particularly beautiful sarcophagi. One room is devoted to Roman antiquities, and another room to Greek antiquities. The city of Grenoble is linked to the story of Champollion and that of Egyptology.

From the 18th century, there are ancient Egyptian pieces from excavations run by the antiques office of the municipal library of Grenoble, of which Jean-François Champollion was the assistant librarian. It is natural that the collection found in the museum has not ceased to be enriched by many gifts in the 19th, and early 20th centuries.

Most important discoveries have been made by the French Society during archaeological excavations conducted in 1907 and 1913, following the excavation of Antinoöpolis, of Touna-el-Gebel, and of Kom el Ahmar, and later by the family of Count Saint-Ferriol in 1916. In April 2010, the "prophétesse d'Antinoé", a 6th-century mummy discovered in 1907, in a Coptic necropolis at Antinoöpolis in Middle Egypt, was returned to the Museum of Grenoble, after more than fifty years of absence.

The collection of ancient Egyptian antiquities is regarded as the fifth largest in France, after that of the Louvre, the Museum of Archeology Mediterranean in Marseille, Lyon, and Dijon. It includes furniture and funerary objects of everyday life. The entire tomb is impressive, especially the fragmentary tomb of Amenhotep son of Hapu, vizier of Amenhotep III.

A third room of antiquities contains an interesting collection of Greek and Etruscan ceramic statues.

=== 13th to 16th century ===
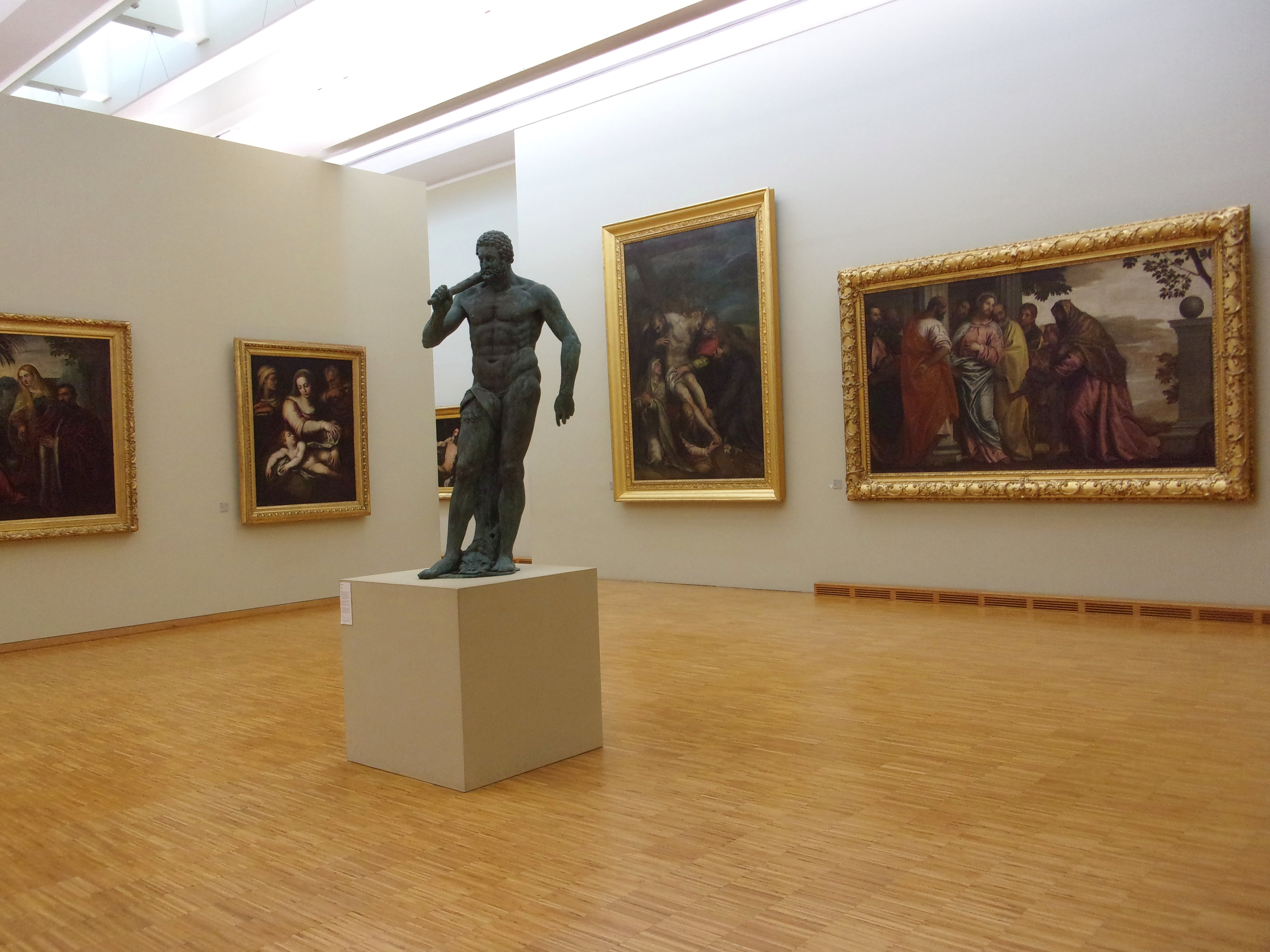
Room 1, 13th century

The collection begins with the origins of Western painting, then quickly reaches the period of Renaissance art.

- Santa Lucia assigned to Jacopo Torriti
- Three part work: The Virgin and Child with St. Gerard, St. Paul, St. Andrew and St. Nicolas (1395) by Taddeo di Bartolo
- Christ meeting a woman and the sons of Zebedee and Noli me tangere by Veronese
- The statue of Hercules a bronze dating from the 16th century and made by the sculptor Jacob Richier in the 17th century, a copy is placed in the centre of the City Garden at the Hôtel de Lesdiguières in Grenoble.

Works of Pérugin (2 paintings), Fra Bartolomeo (attributed to), Giorgio Vasari, Adrien Ysenbrandt, and Georg Pencz can also be found in this section.

=== 17th century ===
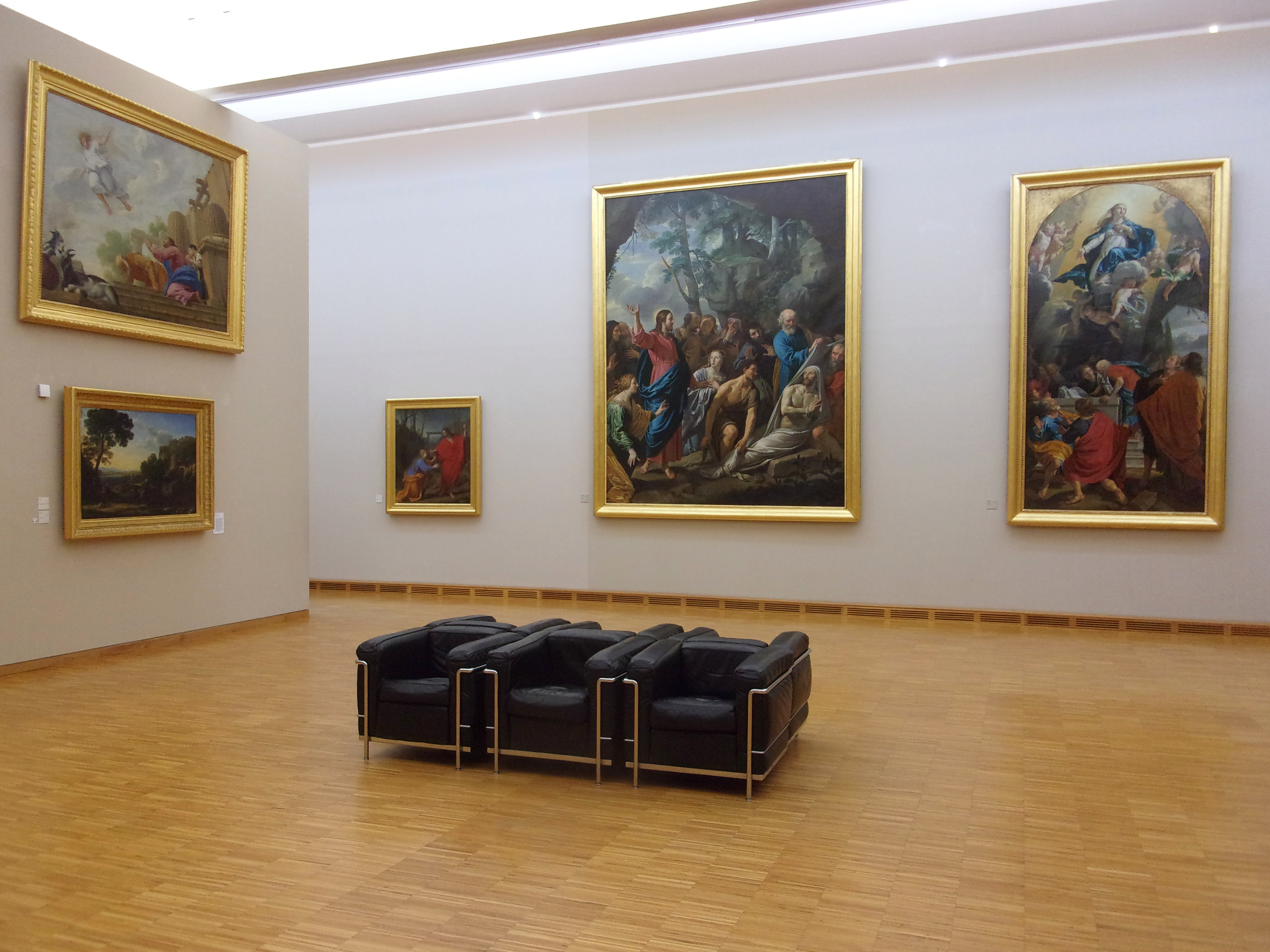
Room 8, 17th century

This prestigious section is devoted to French, Flemish, Dutch, Spanish, and Italian painters and includes many masterpieces. In particular the following works can be mentioned:

- Saint Jerome by Georges de La Tour
- The finest collection of paintings by Francisco de Zurbarán in a French museum.
- Pope Gregory surrounded by saints by Rubens
- Six paintings by Philippe de Champaigne (second to the Louvre in collection size)
- Noli Me Tangere and his hanging The appearance of Christ to pilgrims of Emmaus Laurent de La Hyre.
- The card game in a Hotel by David Teniers, scene of daily life in the 17th century.

Many other works can also be found such as:

- L'Albane
- Gioacchino Assereto: Le Songe de Jacob, acquis en 2011
- Abraham Bloemaert
- Gerard ter Borch
- Sébastien Bourdon
- Pieter Bruegel the Younger
- Annibale Carracci
- Bernardo Cavallino
- Gaspard de Crayer
- Dominiquin
- Meindert Hobbema
- Gerard van Honthorst
- Jacob Jordaens: Le Sommeil d'Antiope, 1650 et L'Adoration des bergers
- Jean Jouvenet
- Charles de La Fosse
- Charles Le Brun
- Eustache Le Sueur
- Robert Le Lorrain: Paysage pastoral (1644)
- Pierre Mignard
- Adam François van der Meulen
- Mattia Preti: The Martyr of Saint Peter
- Nicolas Régnier
- José de Ribera
- Peter Paul Rubens
- Salomon van Ruysdael
- Frans Snyders
- Bartholomeus Spranger
- Matthias Stom
- Bernardo Strozzi
- Alessandro Turchi
- Anthony van Dyck
- Claude Vignon
- Simon Vouet: Le Christ apparaissant à saint Antoine Abbé (vers 1638–1639)

=== 18th century ===
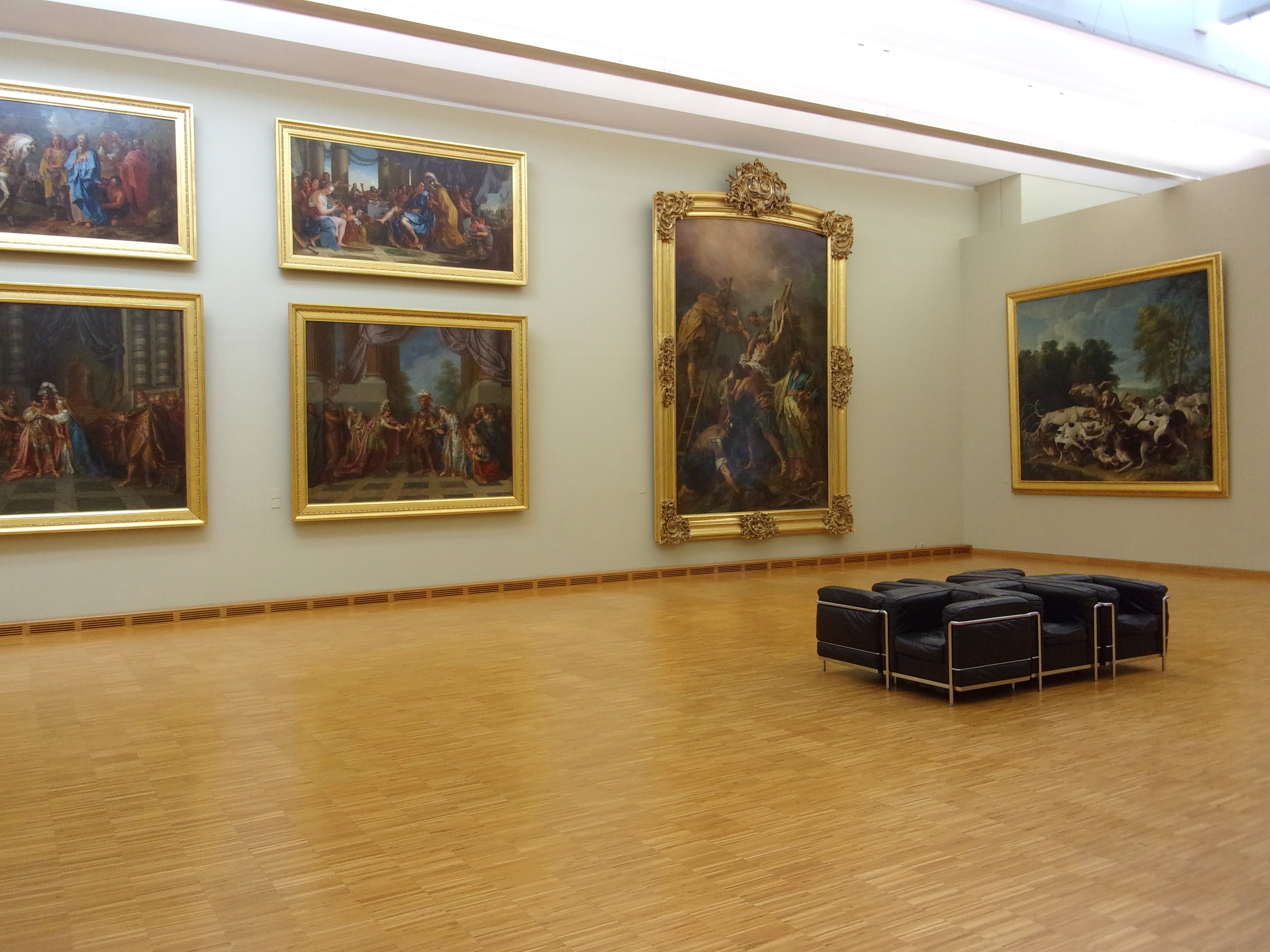
Room 12, 18th century.

The works of this century are presented in the majestic grand format of the French school, such as Martyrdom of St Andrew painted in 1749 by Jean Restout for the collegiate Church of Saint-André in Grenoble.

- The Point of the Customs at Venice Canaletto
- The Doge of Venice carried by the gondoliers by Francesco Guardi.
- Animals flowers and fruit, painted in 1717 by François Desportes
- Snowy Landscape with rocks and Travelers painted around 1750 by Francesco Foschi
- Roger arriving in Alcine Island, 1740 by Hyacinthe Collin de Vermont (One of the largest paintings in the museum)

Other paintings are notably by: Nicolas de Largilliere, Hyacinthe Rigaud, Jean-Baptiste Greuze, Joseph-Marie Vien, Sebastiano Ricci, Giovanni Paolo Pannini, and Thomas Gainsborough. This section also displays many busts by Antoine Barnave.

=== 19th century ===
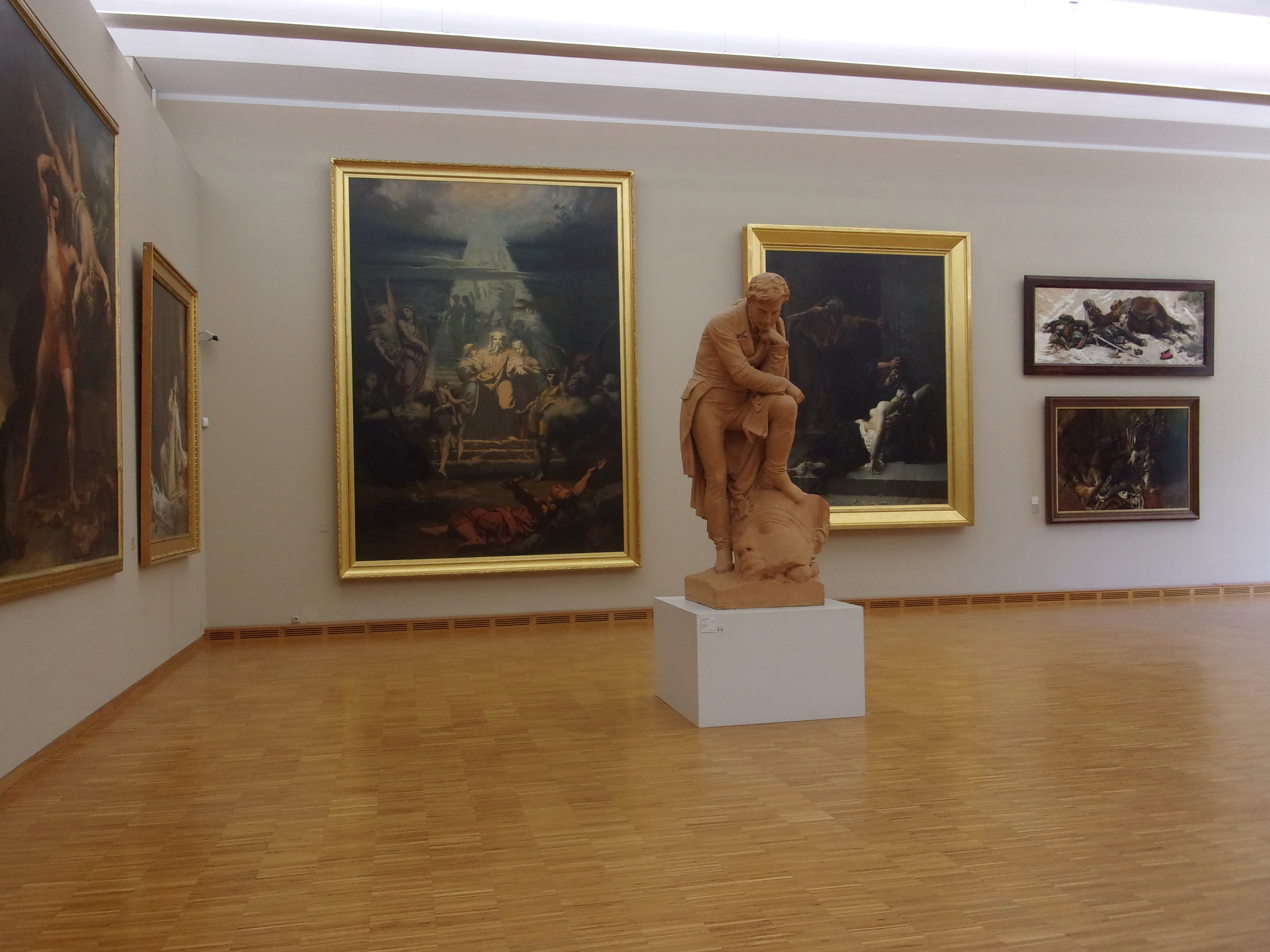
Room 17, 19th century

The 19th century is illustrated by a remarkable ensemble from the final period of neoclassicism until the period of Les Nabis, with works by:

- Frédéric Bazille
- Charles-Alphonse-Paul Bellay
- Camille Corot
- Gustave Courbet
- Eugène Delacroix
- Gustave Doré, Loch in Scotland after the Storm (1875–1878)
- Eugénie du Colombier, "Portrait of Charles Planelli de Lavalette" (1832), "Portrait of Benjamin Rolland" (1832)
- Henri Fantin-Latour, whose wife left an important legacy to the Museum in 1921.
- Augustin Feyen-Perrin
- Paul Gauguin, The White River and Portrait of Madeleine Bernard.
- Théodore Géricault
- Girodet-Trioson, Portrait of Benjamin Rolland (1816).
- Gabriel Guay, Le Lévite d'Ephraïm (1878).
- Jean-Auguste-Dominique Ingres
- Maximilien Luce
- Camille Pissarro, The House of Folly at Eragny (1885).
- Auguste Renoir
- Pierre Révoil
- Benjamin Rolland, Young Girl entering the Bath (1805), A Father and his sick Child (1808)
- Théo van Rysselberghe
- Adelaïde Salles-Wagner
- Alfred Sisley
- Félix Vallotton, Naked Woman sitting in an Armchair (1897).

Essentially an art museum, the Museum of Grenoble nevertheless has some sculptures from the 19th century, mostly in rooms 18 and 19, including that of Phryne from James Pradier. In room 17, is a plaster 2 metres high of Jean-François Champollion by the sculptor Bartholdi. This plaster has served as a model for the marble sculpture at the Collège de France in Paris.

=== Regional art of the 19th century ===
The Dauphinoise school of the 19th century, reached a level that justifies the prominence it holds in the museum. If a large room displays these small paintings it is above all this landscape format that gives them their soul. The founder of this school, Jean Achard created the first majestic landscapes that excited the painters that followed: Laurent Guétal, Charles Bertier, Ernest Hébert, the Abbe Cales. Many of these painters, despite the topographical precision required, thought it an inspired vision.

=== 20th century ===
Rooms from 24 to 48

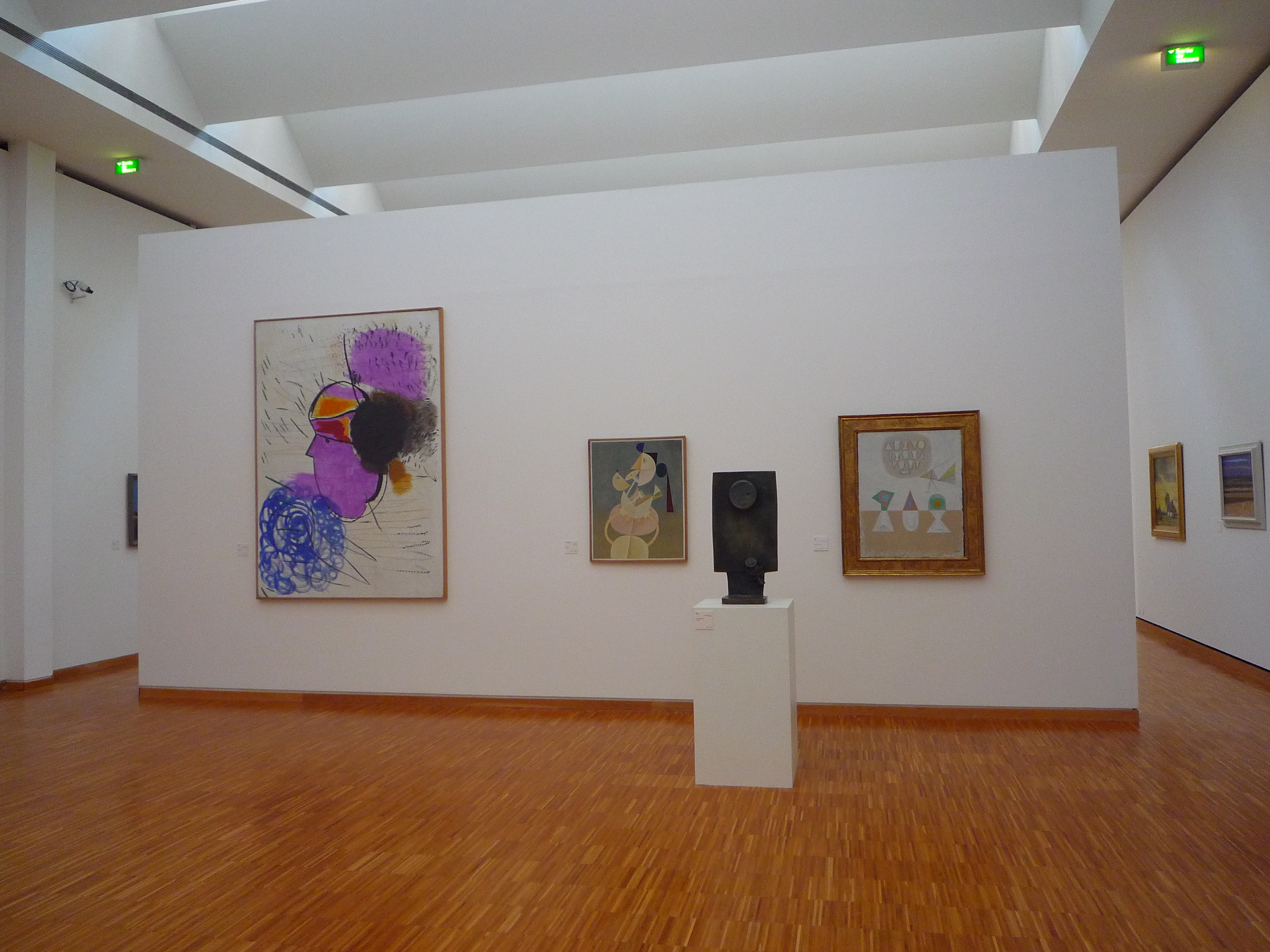
Room 36 of the 20th century collection

The section of the 20th century is particularly rich because the museum is considered the oldest museum of contemporary art in France.

Spread over more than twenty rooms, the collection covers modern art from the beginning of the century to the most recent formal developments. Part of the collection comes from the important legacy of Agutte – Sembat. All the trends and movements of the painter are present, such as Fauvism with the paintings of Henri Matisse (8 paintings), André Derain, Albert Marquet, Raoul Dufy, Maurice de Vlaminck, Emile Othon Friesz (6 pictures), Jean Puy, Charles Camoin (Nude with purple shirt, acquired in 2012), and Kees van Dongen. Cubism with Georges Braque, Albert Gleizes and Fernand Léger. The School of Paris, represented by Amedeo Modigliani, Chaïm Soutine, Maurice Utrillo, and Chagall. Four paintings illustrate the different artistic periods of Pablo Picasso while there are also works of painters such as Pierre Bonnard, Jacques Villon, Natalia Goncharova, Paul Signac, Henri-Edmond Cross (5 paintings), Claude Monet, Georges Rouault, Robert Delaunay, Kurt Schwitters, George Grosz, Paul Klee, Wassily Kandinsky, František Kupka, Theo van Doesburg, Jean Arp, Nicolas de Staël, Balthus, Bernard Buffet and Hans Hartung.

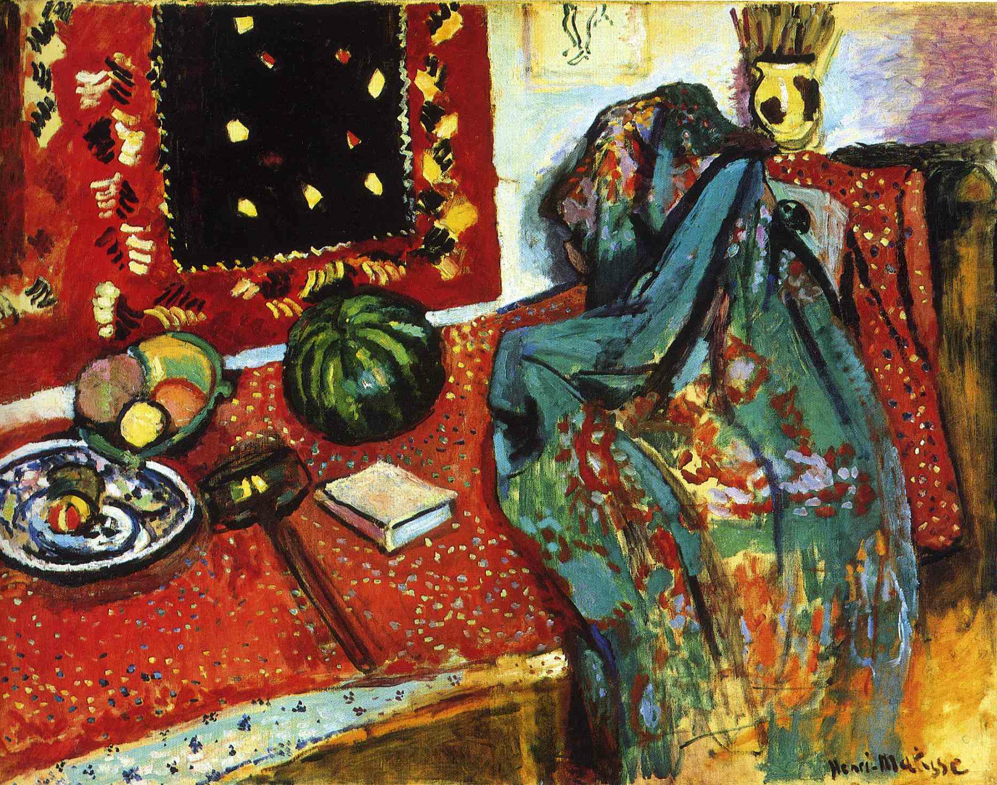
Henri Matisse, 1906, Le Tapis rouge, Intérieur au tapis rouge, oil on canvas, 89 x 116 cm

Matisse donated his Interior of eggplants, Pablo Picasso's Woman reading in 1921 Claude Monet's Corner of the pond at Giverny in 1923. Great names of surrealism are also present such as Giorgio de Chirico, René Magritte, Joan Miró, Max Ernst, André Masson, Francis Picabia, and Yves Tanguy. Sculptures are also present in some rooms with works of Auguste Rodin, Georges Rouault(female nude, c.1909), Henri Laurens, Raymond Duchamp-Villon, Jacques Lipchitz, Julio Gonzalez, Ossip Zadkine, Max Ernst (A lost Chinaman), Alberto Giacometti, Alexander Calder, and even Henri Matisse, again thanks to the Agutte-Sembat legacy.

The Museum of Grenoble is also a reference for contemporary art, its collection is one of the oldest in France, including works by Pierre Soulages, Christian Boltanski (Monument), Christo, Tàpies, Andy Warhol, Donald Judd, Robert Ryman, Jean Dubuffet, Jean Peyrissac, Annette Messager and Rebecca Horn.

In 2012, the Museum of Grenoble acquired one of the thirteen pinned cubist collages of Pablo Picasso dated Spring 1914. Acquired for an amount of 750,000 euros thanks to the patrons club of the museum, "Glass" will be presented for three years for two-month periods starting from 19 December 2012.

=== 21st century ===
Rooms from 49 to 54

The last rooms located on level-2 are devoted to the present century. They highlight the great diversity of forms and concerns explored by the creators of today using a variety of materials, techniques and inspiration.

The Blue Head by Thomas Schutte is characteristic of this diversity.

=== Drawings ===
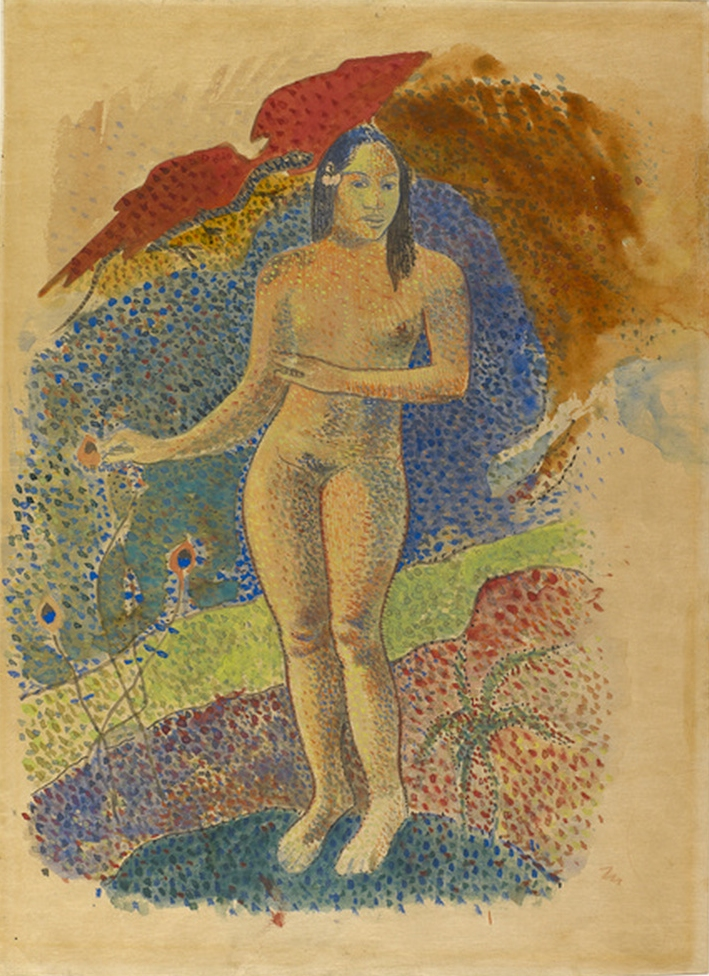
Te nave nave fenua, Paul Gauguin, 1892. Drawing of his Tahitian period where he represents his companion, Teha'amana. (painting is in Ohara Museum of Art, Japan)

Most often displayed in the Tower if the Island, arranged into an exhibition of graphic arts, the old collection consists of 5,500 drawings mainly from donations and bequests of Léonce Mesnard in the 19th century. He will devote part of his life to his writings and collections. At his death in May 1890, the Mayor of Grenoble, Auguste Gache, gave a eulogy on his great generosity in leaving 3,207 items to the Museum.

Italian drawings predominate, especially the Venetians, and the Florentines of the Renaissance and of Seicento although there are also many other single drawings. The Museum owns drawings by: Parmigianino (Parmesan), Palma the Younger, Annibale Carracci, Agostino Ciampelli, Guido Reni, Guercino, Luca Giordano, Giambattista Tiepolo, Giandomenico Tiepolo, Francesco Guardi, Giovanni Battista Piazzetta etc..

The old French drawings have recently been studied by Guillaume Kazerouni, Barbara Brejon de Lavergnée, and Jérôme Delaplanche, resulting in the publication of a catalogue and enabling new attributions through the discovery of new designs: for the 17th century, a collection of drawings was found by artists such as: Laurent de La Hyre, Philippe de Champaigne, and Vouet. The 18th century is represented by famous artists such as Watteau, Hubert Robert, and David. The Dutch school stands out for its importance most notably Jacob Jordaens and Rembrandt. The 19th century is characterized by an important series by artists such as: Eugène Delacroix, Paul Gauguin, Fantin-Latour, and Jongkind with watercolors by Dauphiné.

The 20th century collection ranks second in terms of importance for a French museum after the National Museum of Modern Art. As for the paintings, they owe much to the policy of the curator Andry-Farcy. In 1923, the legacy of Agutte-Sembat brought in 24 drawings including a charcoal sketch of The Dance by Matisse in 1909. Other than Matisse (with 28 works in all) the collection includes drawings by: Jean Arp, Antonin Artaud, Pierre Bonnard, Alexander Calder, Marc Chagall, Jean Cocteau, André Derain (Portrait of Francis Carco), Raoul Dufy (68 works), Max Ernst, Leonard Foujita, Julio Gonzalez, Juan Gris, František Kupka, Le Corbusier, Fernand Léger, Alberto Magnelli, Albert Marquet, André Masson, Joan Miró, Amedeo Modigliani, Pablo Picasso (Glass, glued paper from 1914 acquired in 2012), Kurt Schwitters, Paul Signac, Cy Twombly, Suzanne Valadon, Maurice de Vlaminck, Édouard Vuillard, and Ossip Zadkine.

== Some works exhibited ==
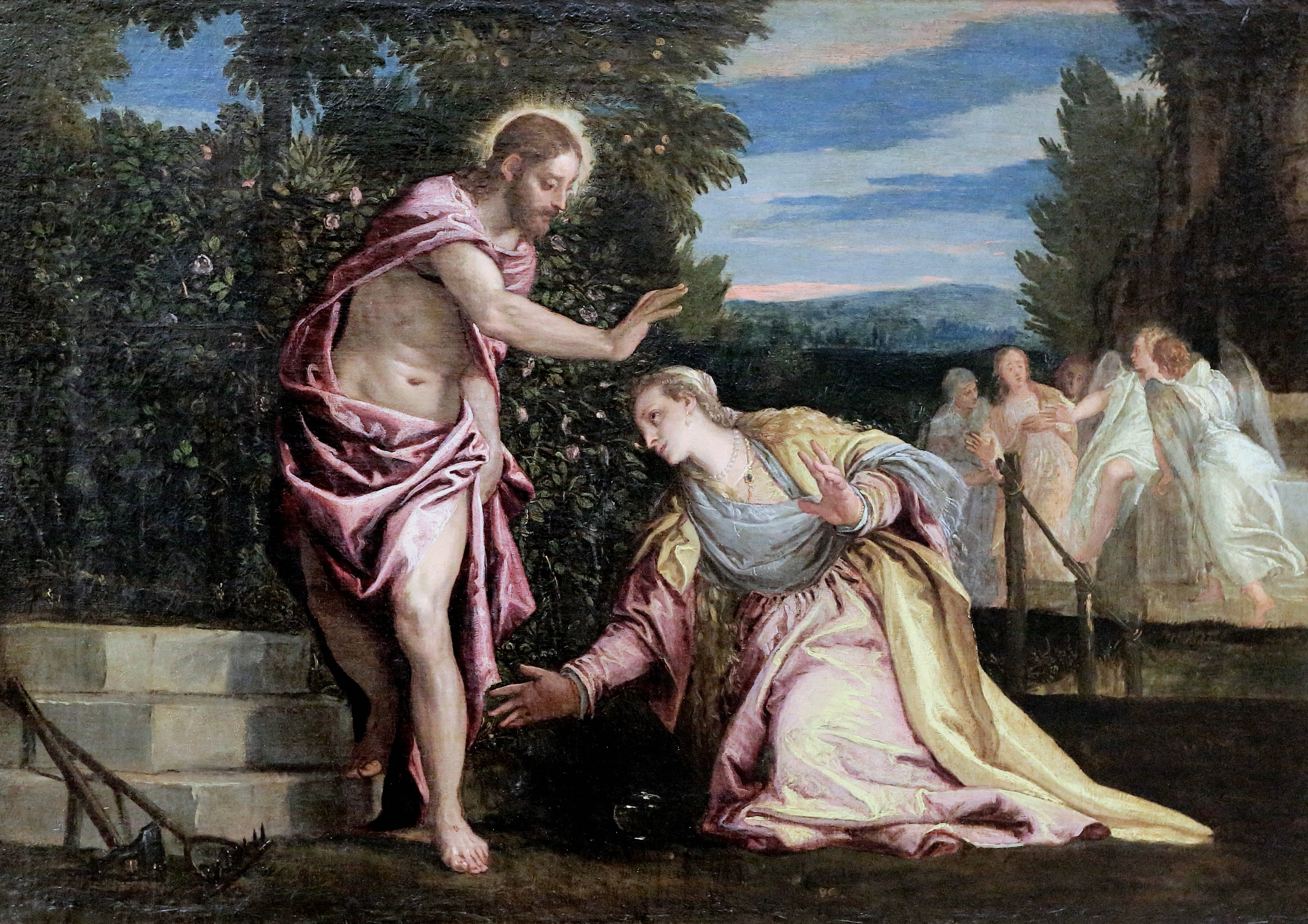
Paul Veronese, Noli me tangere

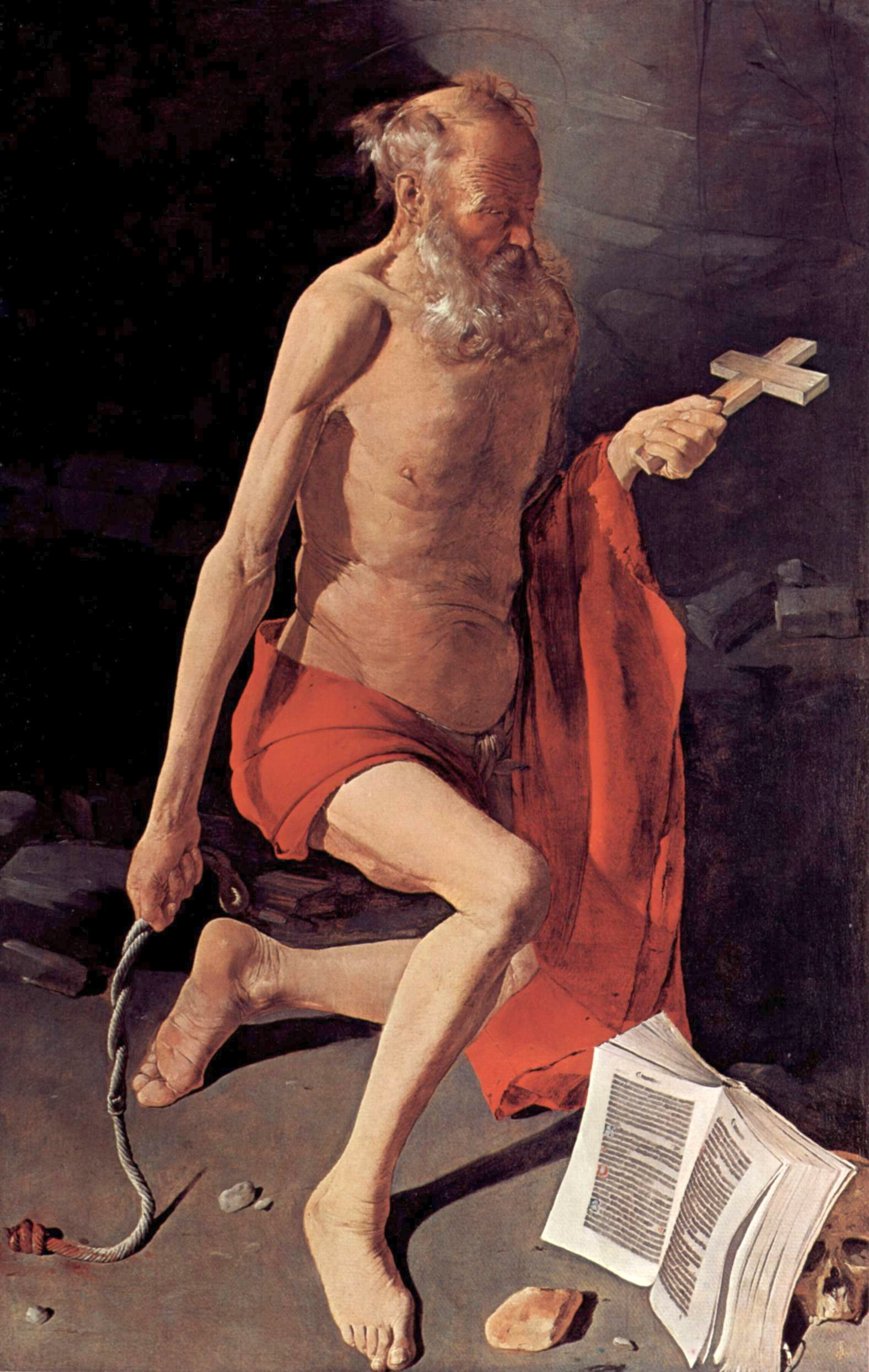
Georges de La Tour, Saint Jérôme

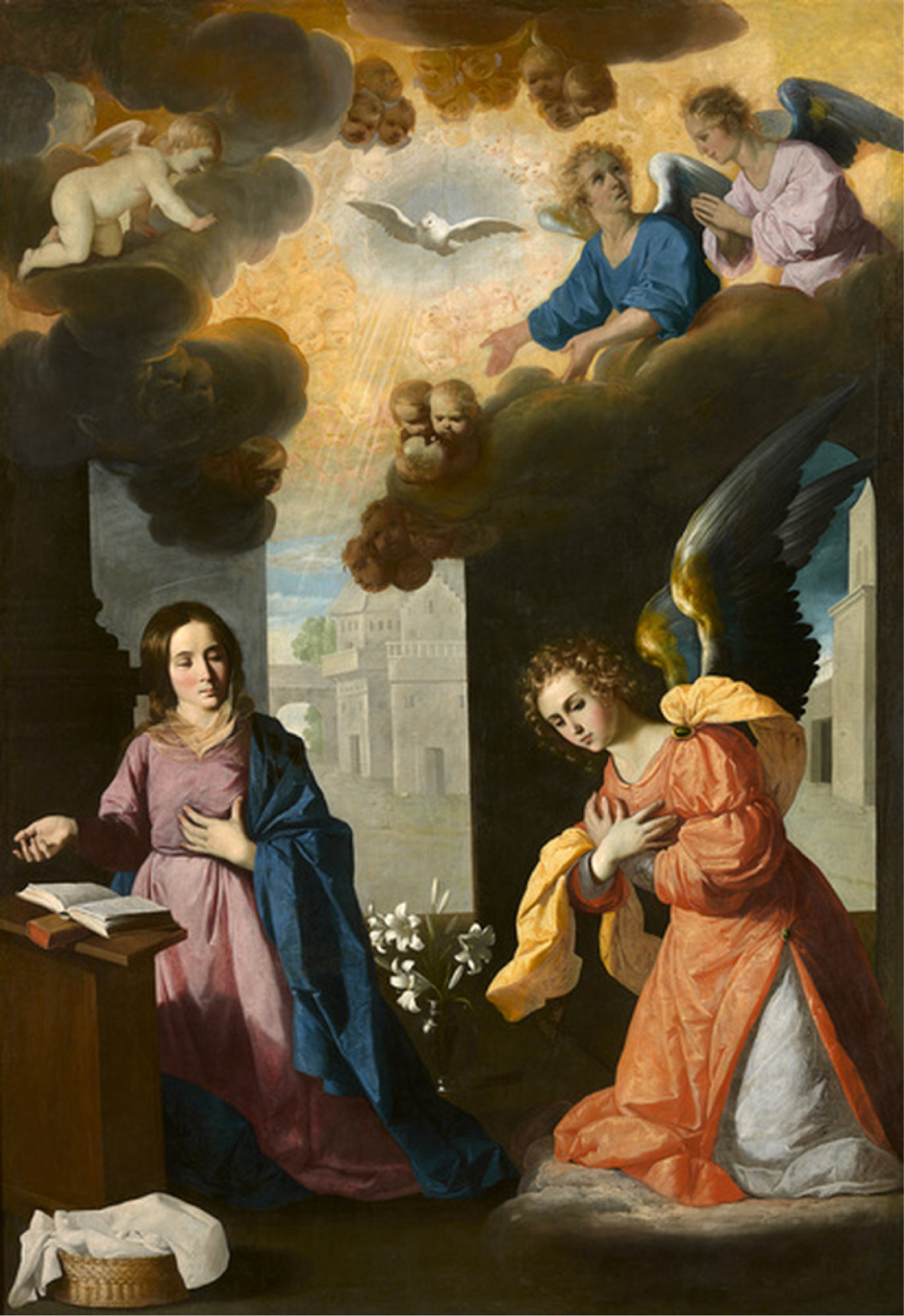
Francisco de Zurbarán, L'Annonciation

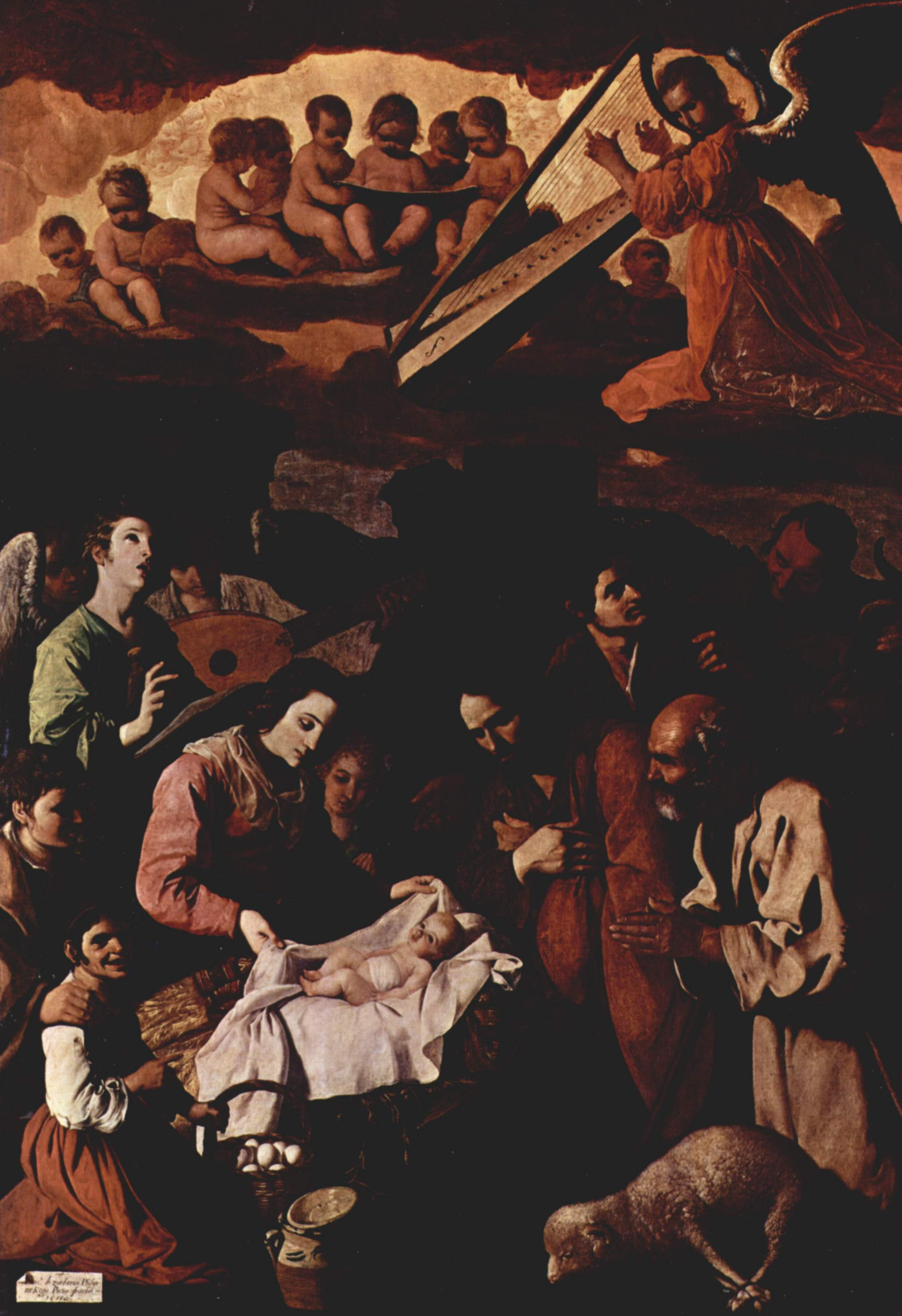
Francisco de Zurbarán, L'Adoration des bergers

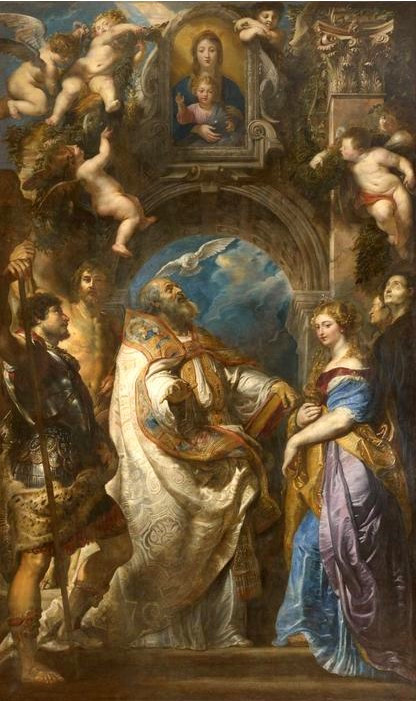
Peter Paul Rubens, Saint Grégoire pape, entouré de saints et de saintes

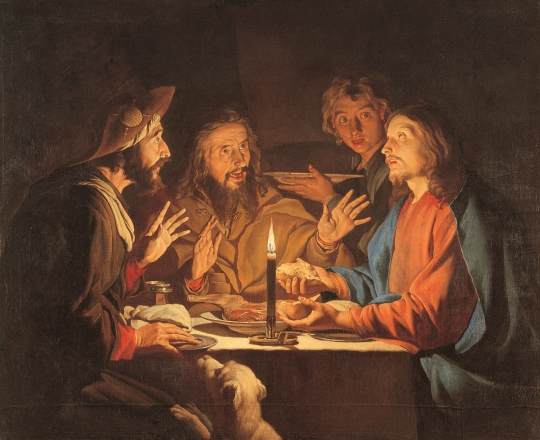
Matthias Stom, Le Repas d'Emmaüs

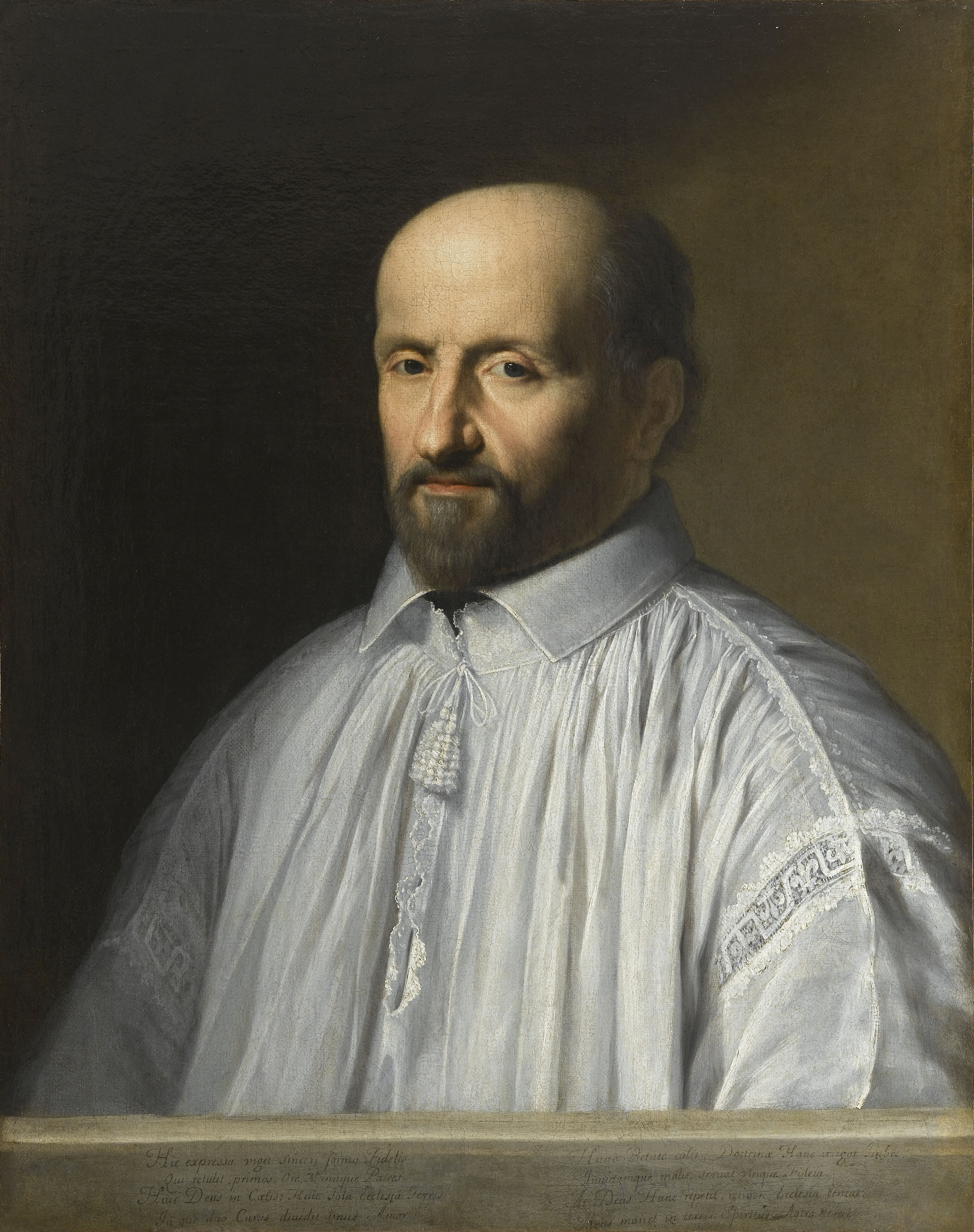
Philippe de Champaigne, Jean Duvergier de Hauranne

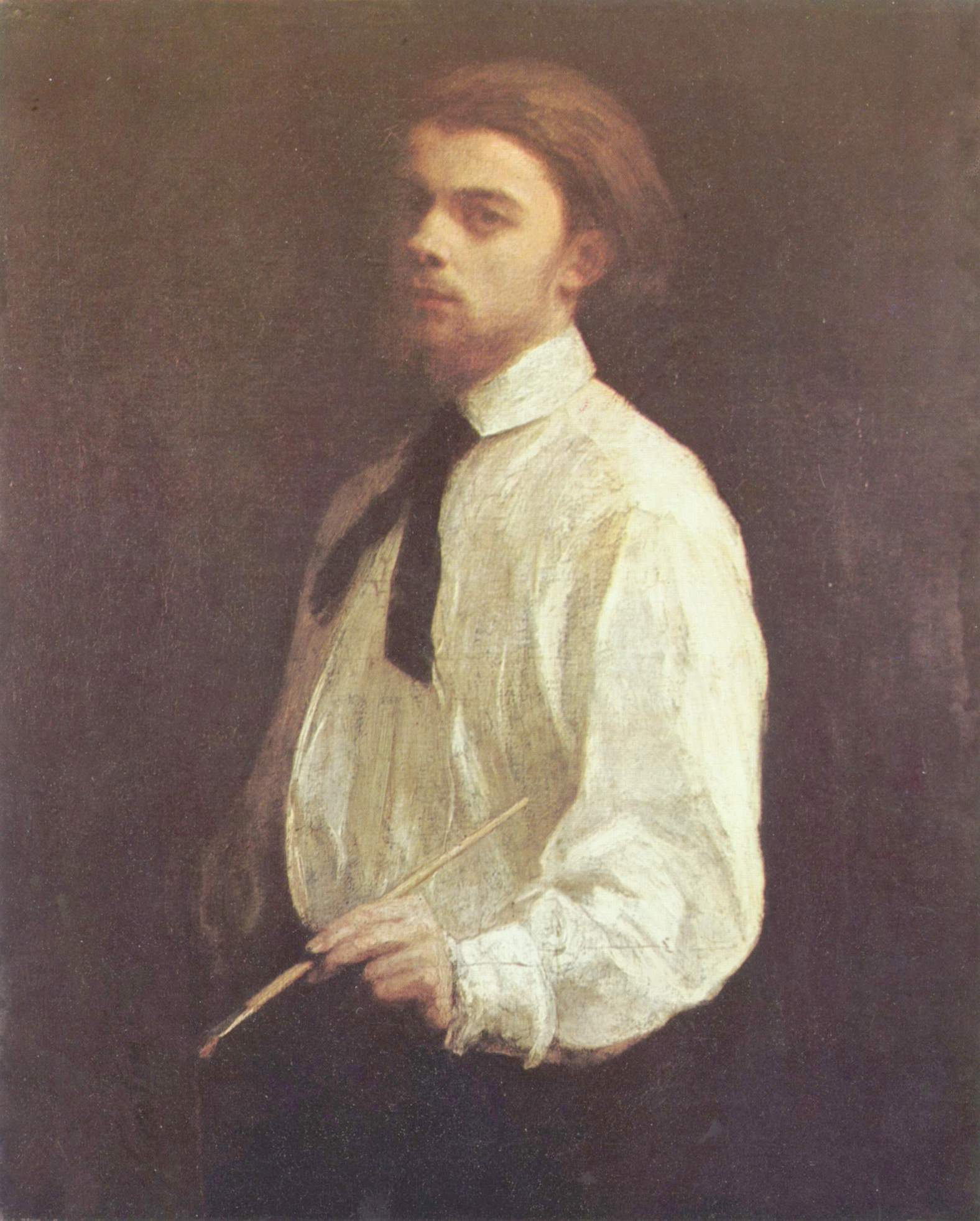
Henri Fantin-Latour, Autoportrait (1859)

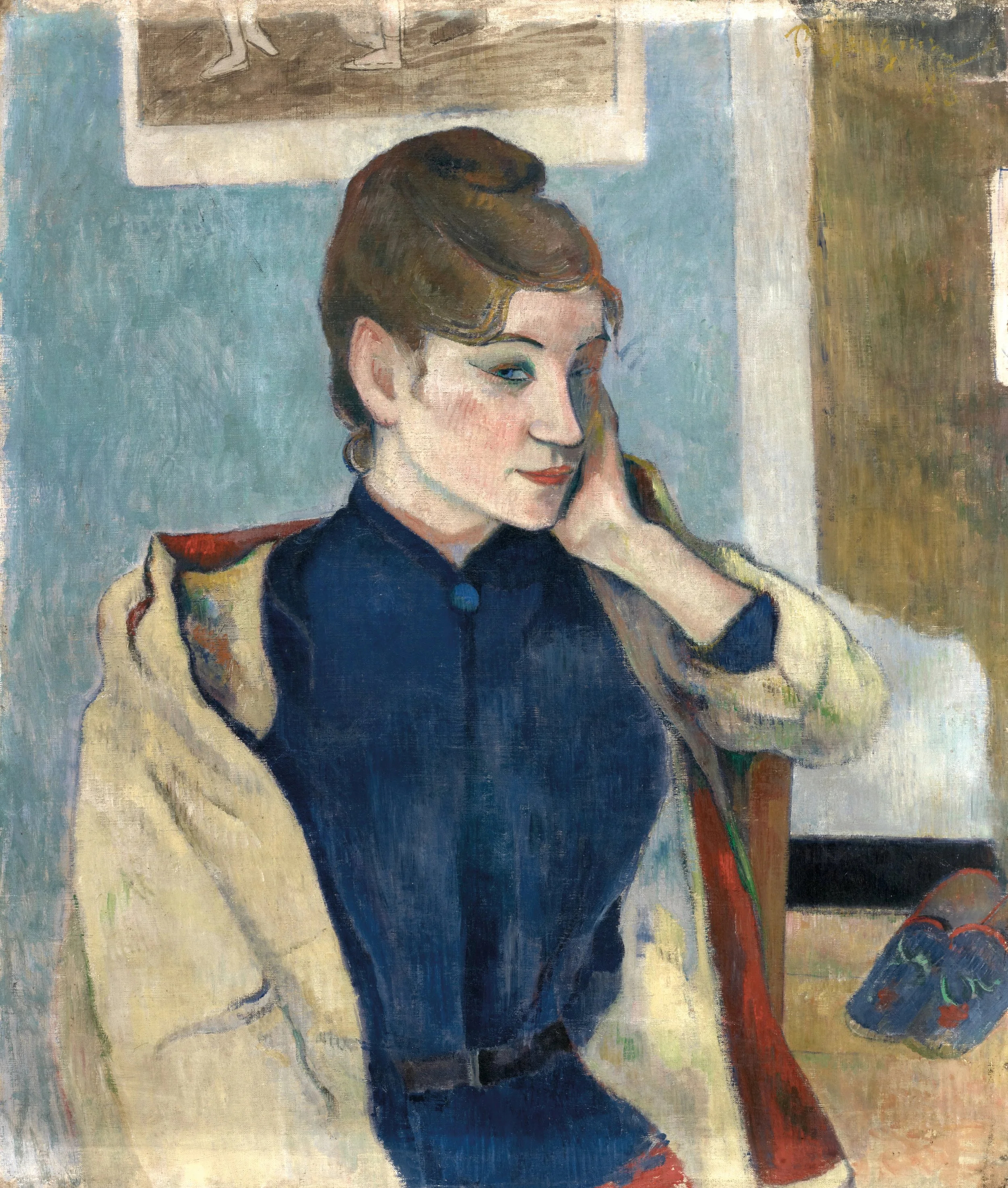
Paul Gauguin, Portrait de Madeleine Bernard

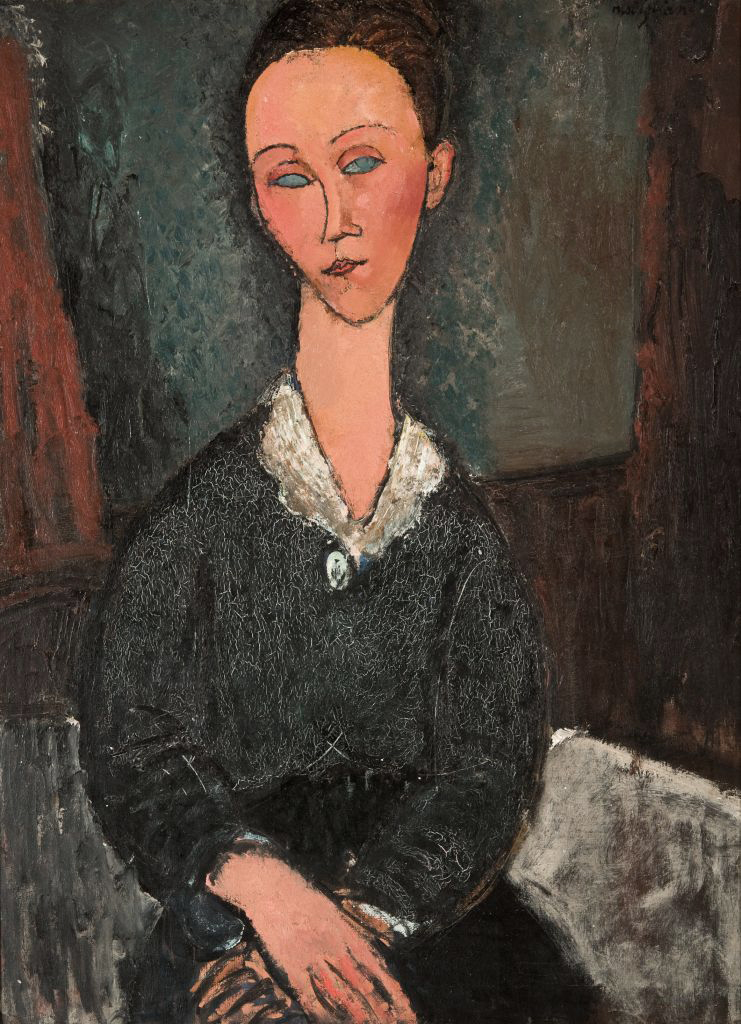
Amedeo Modigliani, Portrait de femme au col blanc (1917)

== The sculpture garden ==
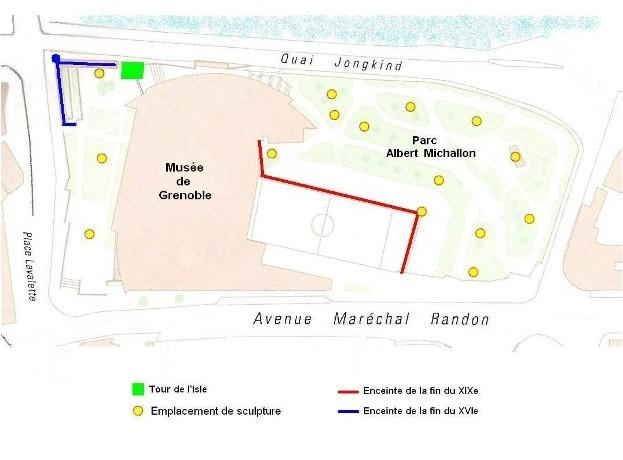
Sitemap of museum.

A sculpture garden, a concept born in the 17th century, has been installed on the perimeter east / north-west of the museum, in Albert-Michallon Park.

Covering an area of 16,000 m^{2}, in 1964 it was the first development allowed at the location of an old half moon fortification. Overall, the park is a square shape and meets the path of the massive 19th-century fortification wall that ends inside the museum. Beautifully landscaped, this park contains the oldest tree in the city, a Cedar from Lebanon planted in 1847. It offers a unique opportunity in the heart of town to display outdoor sculptures.

The surface of the Michallon Park does not allow an unlimited area to present sculptures. In 1988, the choice of development was focused on the 20th century period, consistent with the extensive collection of the contemporary art museum. Going to the park through the front of the museum, partly framed by the walls built at the end of the 16th century by the Duke of Lesdiguieres, two works in metal and a bronze statue placed on the Esplanade François Mitterrand can be seen. These are:

- Alexander Calder – Monsieur Loyal, 1993, height 9 metres, painted steel 1967
- Mark di Suvero – Polar Star, 23 meters high, 18 metres wide, painted steel 1972
- Marcel Gimond – Girl standing, bronze 1934, (in front of the 16th century wall)

In the Albert Michallon Albert Park, some works closest to the museum, such as Duna, are visible from the inside. These are:

- Robert Wlérick – Standing Female Nude, patinated bronze, (1936–1942)
- Marta Pan – Duna (Danube, Hungary) 1992, height 3.30 metres, 5 discs of pink granite 1991
- Ossip Zadkine – Orpheus, bronze 1948
- Bernar Venet – Three Indeterminate Lines, 1994, weathered steel 1992
- Léon-Ernest Drivier & Marcel Gimond – Cecilia, treated antique bronze 1928
- George Rickey – Conversation (mobile sculpture Stainless Steel) 1991
- Gottfried Honegger – Monoform 26, height 5 metres, painted metal 1988
- Morice Lipsi – The Great Wave, stone 1978
- Eduardo Chillida – Zuhaitz (tree), weathered steel 1989
- Anthony Caro – The Song of the mountains, which backs on to the old wall, 1993
- Richard Nonas – Transi West (for 36 Albanians ...), 1994
- Eugene Dodeigne – Couple Pierre de Soignies, 1993

== The Library ==
The Library of Art History is open to the public with consultation on site. Books about the collection and the policy for purchasing works of art are the most important and heavily used by students. The Library is open on Mondays, Wednesdays, and Fridays from 2pm to 6pm. It is closed during summer.

== Temporary exhibitions ==
In addition to space devoted to the presentation of permanent collections, some halls with an area of 1,000 square metres are reserved for temporary exhibitions.

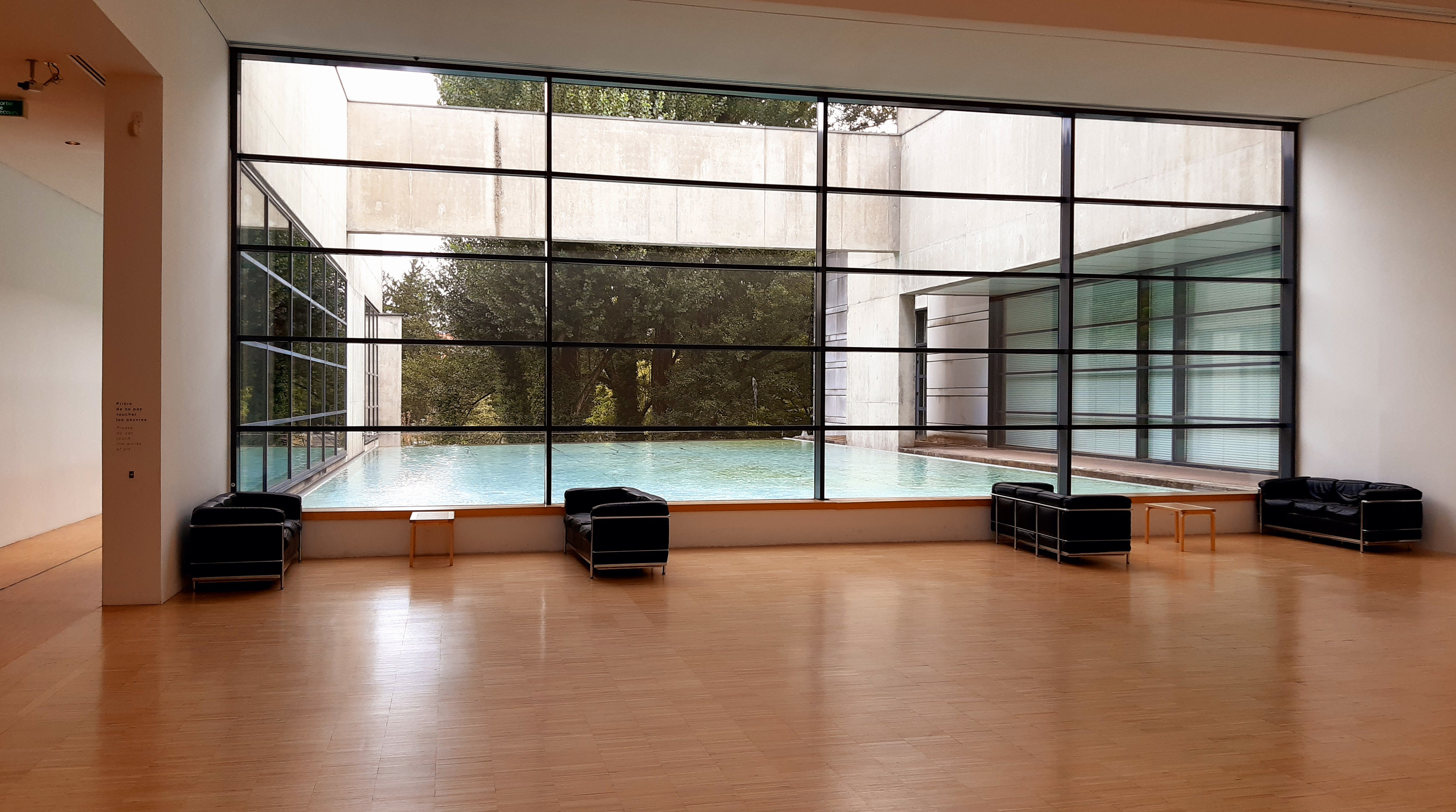
The patio with a water basin.

Each year, two major exhibitions are organized to help make the museum an important centre of French artistic life. At the exit to these rooms, a pool of water encourages visitors to take a break. In 2011 there was a record attendance for a temporary exhibition with 143,230 visitors for the Chagall exhibition surpassing hugely the previous record of 98,000 visitors for the Impressionism of France and America exhibition of 2008. In 2019, the exhibition Serving the gods of Egypt attracts 136,127 visitors, the second largest affluence in the history of the museum.

- 1995: Rebecca Horn
- 1998: The feeling of the mountain
- 2000: Eustache Lesueur
- 2005: Jean Achard, Laurent Guetal, Charles Bertier: three masters of the Dauphinois landscape in the 19th century
- 2006: Braque, Klee, Léger
- 2007: Impressionism in France and America
- 2008: Collection of African art, heritage revealed.
- 2008: Wolfgang Laib Without place, Without Time, Without Body
- 2009: Henriette Deloras, Marc Pessin
- 2009: Patrick Faigenbaum, Gerhard Richter, Alex Katz, Gregory Forstner, Duncan Wylie, Gaston Chaissac
- 2010:
  - 6 March to 30 May 2010:In flesh and spirit – Italian drawings of 15th at 18th centuries
  - March 6 to May 30, 2010: Read Impressionism, six tables six masters
  - July 3, 2010 to January 9, 2011: The General de Beylié, collector and patron
  - October 30, 2010 to January 23, 2011: Stephan Balkenhol
- 2011: 5 March to 13 June: Chagall and the Russian avant garde
- 2012: French drawing of museum (XVIe au XVIIIe siècle) – The idea and the line – The White River – Die Brücke
- 2013 : Alberto Giacometti
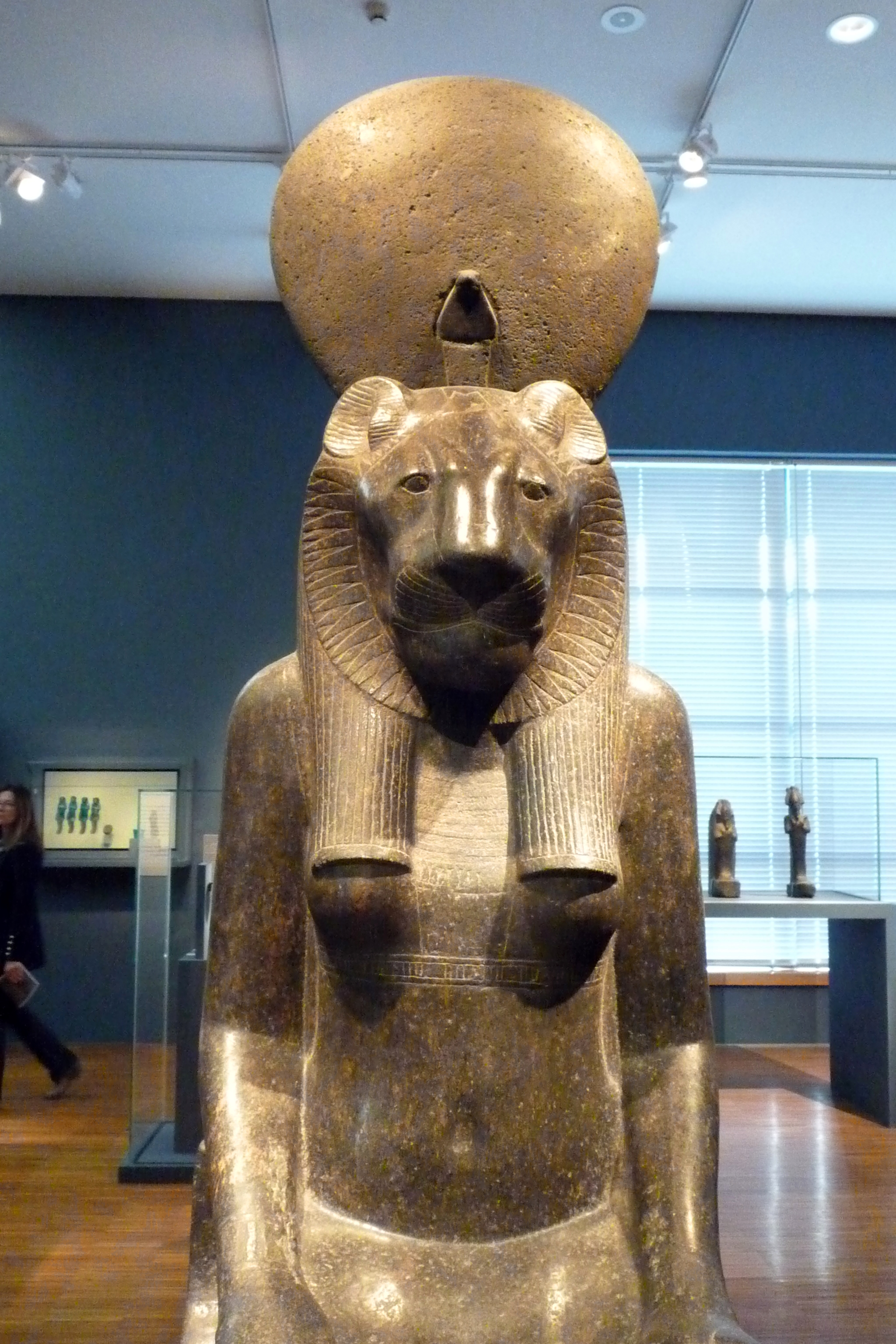
  The goddess Sekhmet at the exhibition Serving the Gods of Egypt.
- 2013 : Sigmar Polke
- 2014 : La pointe et l'ombre, les dessins nordiques du musée de Grenoble 16th at 18th centuries
- 2014 : Giuseppe Penone
- 2015 : De Picasso à Warhol, une décennie d’enrichissement des collections du musée de Grenoble
- 2015 : Georgia O'Keeffe et ses amis photographes
- 2016 : Cristina Iglesias
- 2016 : Kandinsky – Les années parisiennes (1933–1944)
- 2017 : Henri Fantin-Latour – À fleur de peau
- 2017 : Daniel Dezeuze – une retrospective
- 2018 : Drawings from Delacroix to Gauguin
- 2018 : Servir les dieux d'Égypte (Serving the gods of Egypt)
- 2019 : Souvenirs de voyage. Private collection of Antoine de Galbert
- 2019 : Picasso. In the heart of darkness (1939–1945)
- 2020 : Grenoble and its artists in the 19th century
- 2021 : Giorgio Morandi. The collection Magnani-Rocca
- 2021 : Pierre Bonnard

== International trade ==
The Museum of Grenoble is part of the frame (French Regional & American Museum Exchange), one of whose missions is to promote the circulation and exchange of art between French and American museums.

== Bibliography ==
- Joseph Roman, History and description of library-museum of Grenoble, Editor Library Plon, Nourishes and Co. (1890?), Paris
- Gabrielle Kueny, Grenoble, Museum of Fine Arts, Egyptian collection, edition of the meeting of National Museums, Paris, 1979 (ISBN 2-7118-0050-4)
- Foundation of The Hermitage, Masterpieces of the Museum of Grenoble, Library Arts, Lausanne, 1992 (ISBN 2-85047-204-2)
- Serge Lemoine, Museum of Grenoble Editions museums and monuments in France, Paris, 1988 (ISBN 2-907333-02-X)
- Lucile Duc, Museum of Grenoble, un itinéraire de passion, Éditions Artes-Publialp, 1994, Grenoble
- Catherine Chevillot, Painting and sculpture of 19th century, Réunion des musées nationaux, 1995 (ISBN 2-7118-2964-2)
- Serge Lemoine, A collection of Images on the 200th Anniversary of the Museum of Grenoble, 1999 (ISBN 2-7118-3795-5)
- Jean Yves Aupetitallot and Jean Guibal, A museum without walls, Edip, Dijon, 1999 (ISBN 2-906732-64-8)
- Gilles Chomer,French Paintings before 1815 – the collection at the Museum of Grenoble, Réunion des Musées Nationaux, Paris, 2000 (ISBN 2-7118-2950-2)
- Guy Tosatto,The collections of the Museum of Grenoble, Artly Publishing, 2004
- Laurick Zerbini, Collection of African Art at the Museum of Grenoble, Grenoble Museum, 2008 (ISBN 978-88-7439-440-1)
- Eric Pagliano with Catherine Monbeig-Goguel and Philippe Costamagna,Flesh and spirit. Italian Drawings from the Museum of Grenoble, Editions Somogy, 2010 (ISBN 978-2-7572-0305-7)
- Guillaume Kazerouni, with Barbara Brejon de Lavergnée and Jérôme Delaplanche, The idea and the line. French Drawings at the Museum of Grenoble 16th-18th century, Éditions Somogy, 2011 (ISBN 978-2-7572-0481-8).
