= Andry-Farcy =

French painter (1882–1950)

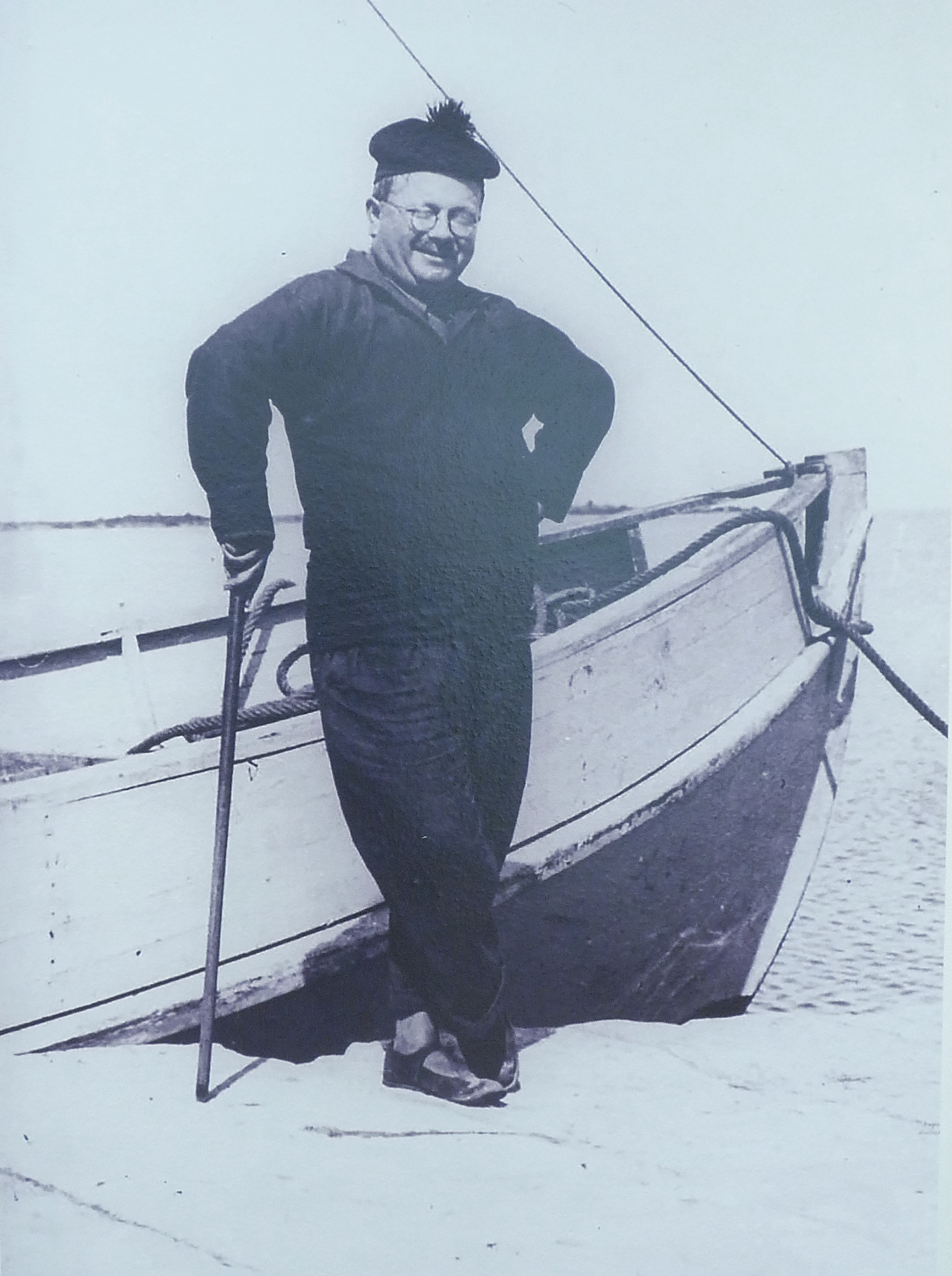
Andry-Farcy.

Pierre-André Farcy (18 May 1882 – 5 July 1950) was a French museum curator, designer and artist, heading the Museum of Grenoble (1919–1943 and 1946–1949) and musée Fantin-Latour (1949–1950). He was popularly known as Andry-Farcy.

He brought contemporary art into the Grenoble collection, becoming a pioneer of contemporary art displays in the 1920s and providing a template for other French towns after the Second World War, stating:

My plans are simple: to continue to do the opposite of what my predecessors did. I open the door to young people, to those who bring a new form.. That is the rule… which will allow us to create the only modern museum in France.

He developed strong relationships with contemporary artists, acquiring an important collection of modern art (Picasso, Bonnard, Matisse) and transforming the Museum of Grenoble into one of France's main art collections. He received bequests from Agutte-Sembat, which added neo-Impressionist and Fauve works, along with the Fantin-Latour donation, which added drawings and engravings. Even artists such as Picasso, Bonnard and Matisse donated their own and others' works. Even if not all his acquisitions were of the same quality, the main masterpieces now in the museum are down to his choices and curiosity at a time when many museums refused to acquire and exhibit these innovative and contested artists.

== Life ==
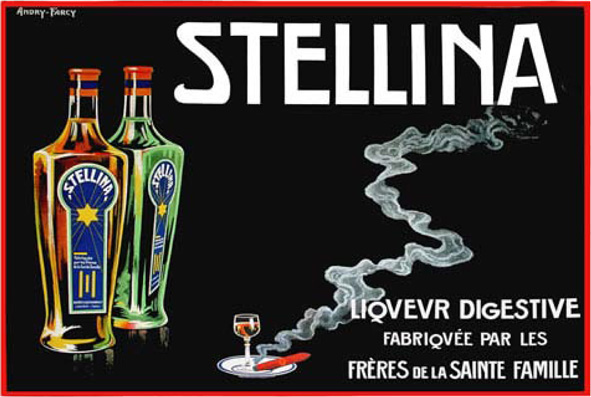
Poster for boissons Stellina designed by Andry-Farcy in 1950.

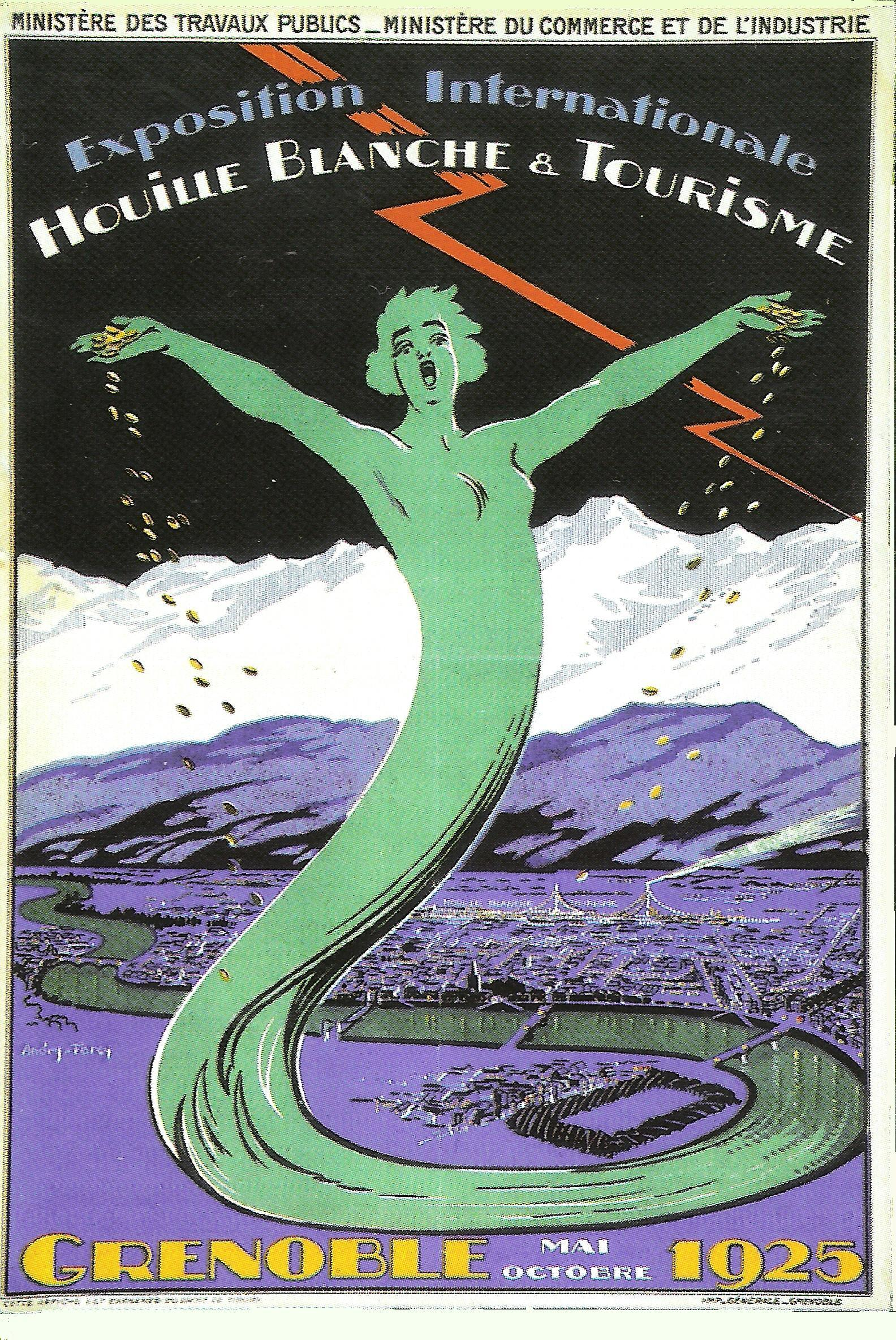
Poster by him for the 1925 International Exhibition.

Born in Charleville, he studied in Paris from 1899 onwards at the École nationale des Arts décoratifs then at the École Nationale des Beaux-Arts, where he was taught by Fernand Cormon. He exhibited at the Salon d'automne in 1905 and at the Salon de Lyon and at around the same time settled permanently in Grenoble. In 1910 he became a journalist, art critic and artist for Petit Dauphinois and set up a poster studio near the Imprimerie Générale, which he ran until the Second World War. From Paris to Grenoble, he moved in avant-garde circles.

In 1914 he became a member of the Museum of Grenoble's consultative commission and was made that museum's curator in 1919 by a vote confirmed the town council's choice (the rival candidate was Tancrède Bastet). He gained recognition for the museum across Europe in the era of the 1925 International Exhibition of Hydropower and Tourism in the town, putting up publicity panels and getting the museum mentioned in tourist guides to the town. He rose through the Légion d'honneur, becoming a Knight (27 January 1927) and then Officer (31 July 1936), also gaining recognition from Belgium as a Knight of the Order of the Crown (1928) and an Officer of the Order of the Gold Lion of the House of Nassau (1936).

He remained the museum's curator for thirty years, supported by the town council who wanted to put the museum on the tourist map despite fierce opposition from a conservative, nationalist and academic cabal which reproached Andry-Farcy for acquiring artworks for the museum that dishonoured the town. In 1943 he was arrested for exhibiting 'degenerate art', imprisoned in Grenoble for twenty-five days then interned at Royallieu-Compiègne, where he became the camp librarian. On 2 September 1944 he was liberated by Canadian troops, moving to Toulouse for a year and unsure whether to return to his role in Grenoble. The director of Musées de France refused to appoint an inspector general of provincial museums, leading Andry-Farcy to return to the Alps and resume his work as curator.

There he expanded his role, also working as an arts advisor for the town of Toulouse, on exhibitions and on cultural and tourist exchange programmes between Grenoble, Nice and Toulouse. On 3 August 1949 he was made curator of the musée Fantin-Latour after Jean Leymarie was nominated his successor at the Museum of Grenoble on 20 July the same year. He died in Grenoble in 1950 and is buried in Toulouse.

== Works ==
The Forney Library contains three posters designed by him and eight documents relating to him, whilst the Museum of Grenoble holds 104 drawings, paintings and posters by him.

One of his paintings, dating to around 1910 and showing the château de Vizille, is on display in the salle de la manufacture at the musée de la Révolution française. His oil on canvas Alpine Hunter is at the musée des Beaux-arts, Chambéry.

== Bibliography (in French) ==
- Vincent, Hélene (1982). Andry-Farcy un conservateur novateur: Le musée de Grenoble de 1919 à 1949. Grenoble: Musée de Grenoble.
- Wantellet, Maurice (1987). Deux siècles et plus de peinture dauphinoise. Grenoble: édité par l'auteur. ISBN 2-9502223-0-7.
