= Family tree of Mahidharapura monarchs =

Mahidharapura Dynasty (Khmer: រាជត្រកូលមហិធរៈបុរៈ; Thai: ราชวงศ์มหิธรปุระ; Roman: House of Mahidharapura, Mahidra pura) Family of Mahidharpura, some sources call Mahitarapura dynasty or Khom royal family. The Mahidharapura dynasty of the Varman dynasty was established by Hiranyavarman and was known after the accession of Jayavarman VI in 1080. Its ancestor was Hiranyavarman of the royal family ruling Bhimapura.

== Family Tree ==
Family tree of Mahidharapura monarchs

Hiranyavarman
□	Dharanindra -Varman I r.1107-1113	Jayavarman VI r.1080-1107	□	Suryavarman I r.1006-1050
Ksitindratiya	Mahidharaditya	Harsha -Varman III r.1066-1080	Udayaditya -Varman II r.1050-1066
Suryavarman II ?-1145/1150 r.1113-1145/1150	Dharanindra -Varman II r.1150-1160	Chudamani
Indradevi	Jayavarman VII; 1125–1218 r.c. 1181–1218	Yasovarman II r.1160-1166
Indravarman II c. 1215-1243
Jayavarman VIII r.1243-1295
Indrajaya -Varman r.1308-1327	Indravarman III r.1295-1308	Indra -bhupesvera Cuda
Jayavarman IX r.1327-1336
