= Phimeanakas =

Hindu temple at Angkor, Cambodia

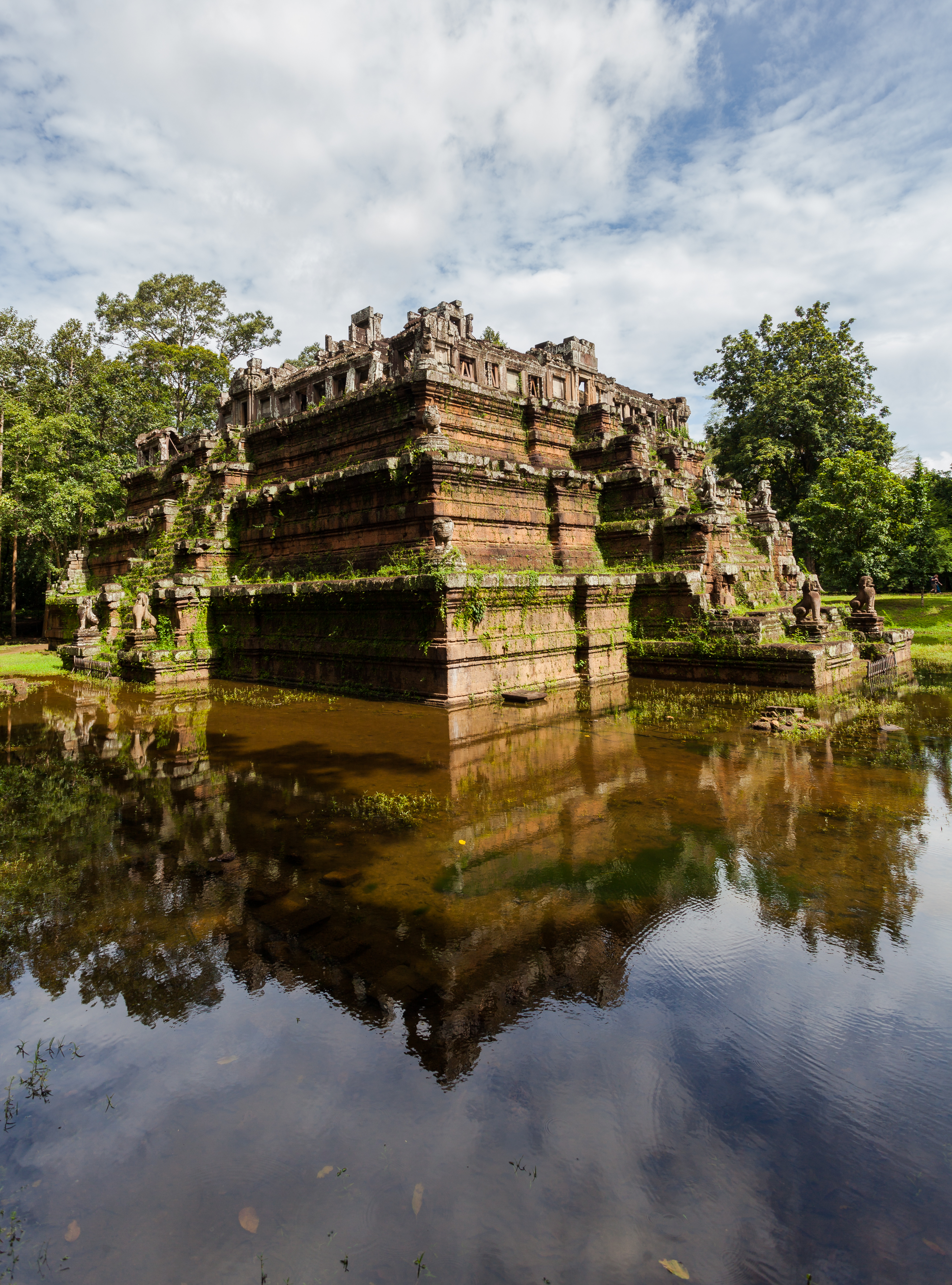

- Location in Cambodia

Religion
- Affiliation: Hinduism

Location
- Location: Angkor
- Country: Cambodia
- Interactive map of Phimeanakas
- Coordinates: 13°26′44″N 103°51′21″E

Architecture
- Creator: Rajendravarman
- Completed: end of the 10th century

Phimeanakas (Khmer: ប្រាសាទភិមានអាកាស, Prasat Phimean Akas, 'celestial temple') or Vimeanakas (Khmer: ប្រាសាទវិមានអាកាស, Prasat Vimean Akas) at Angkor, Cambodia, is a Hindu temple in the Khleang style, built at the end of the 10th century, during the reign of Rajendravarman (from 941 to 968), then completed by Suryavarman I in the shape of a three tier pyramid as a Hindu temple. On top of the pyramid there was a tower, while on the edge of top platform there are galleries. Phimeanakas is located inside the walled enclosure of the Royal Palace of Angkor Thom north of Baphuon.

== Description ==
The temple was the centrepiece of Suryavarman I's capital. The buildings there from his reign are enclosed by a wall 600 by 250 m, with five gopuram, and include the Southern and Northern Khleangs.

The tower was originally crowned with a golden pinnacle, as Zhou Daguan described it in The Customs of Cambodia, written in 1297 CE. According to legend, kings spent the first watch of every night with a woman thought to represent a Nāga in the tower, and during this time not even a queen could intrude. Only in the second watch did the king return to his palace with the queen. If the nāga (considered the supreme landowner of the Khmer realm) did not appear for a night, the king's days would be numbered; if the king did not visit her, calamity would strike the land.

One of the stele states Jayavarman VII, while on a military expedition in Champa, learned that his father Dharanindravarman II had died, and “returned in great haste to aid King Yasovarman II. His second wife, Indradevi, “...composed in impeccable Sanskrit the inscription...panegyric of her sister” Jayarajadevi, which included biographical detail of Jayavarman VII.

== Gallery ==
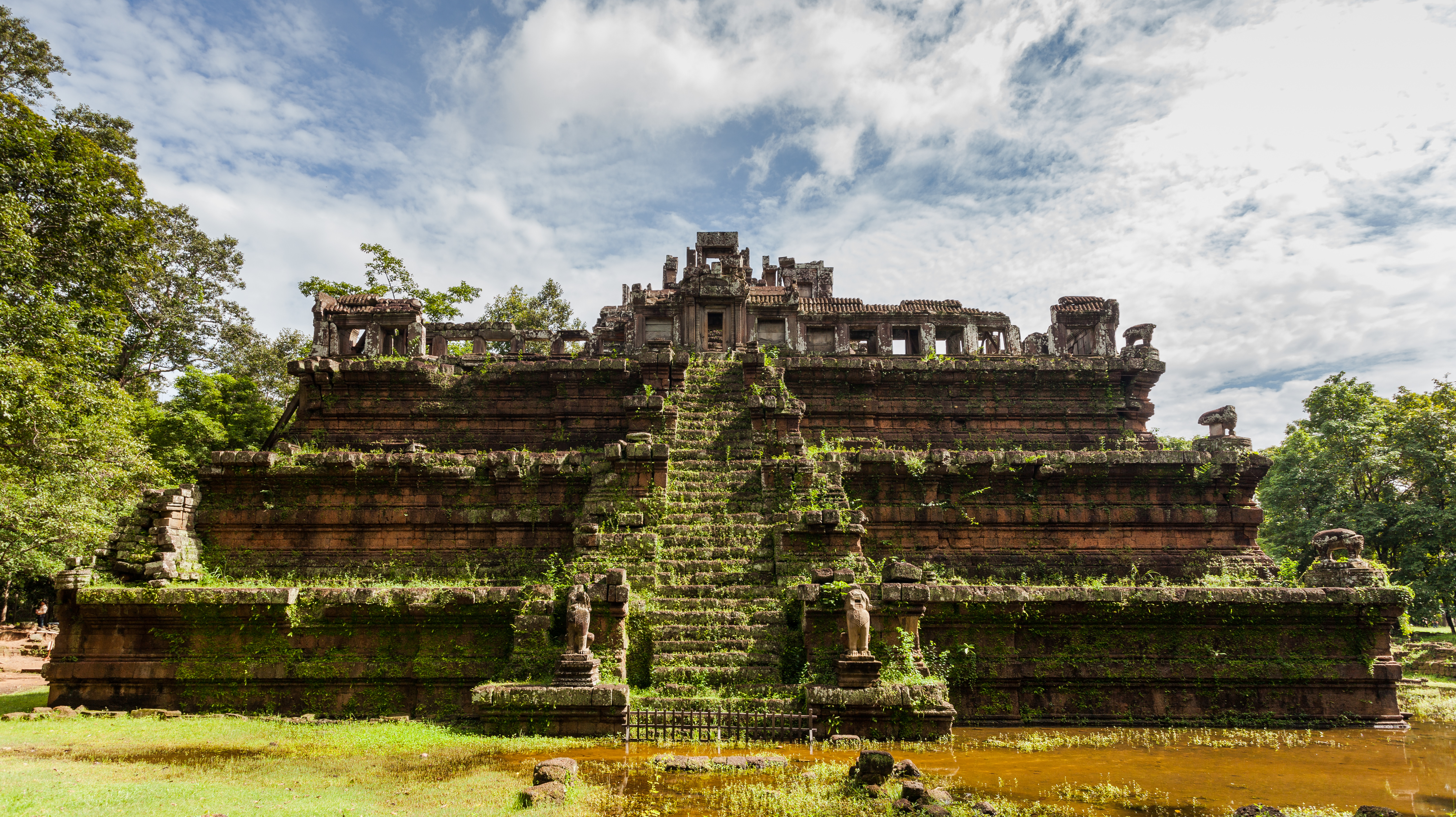

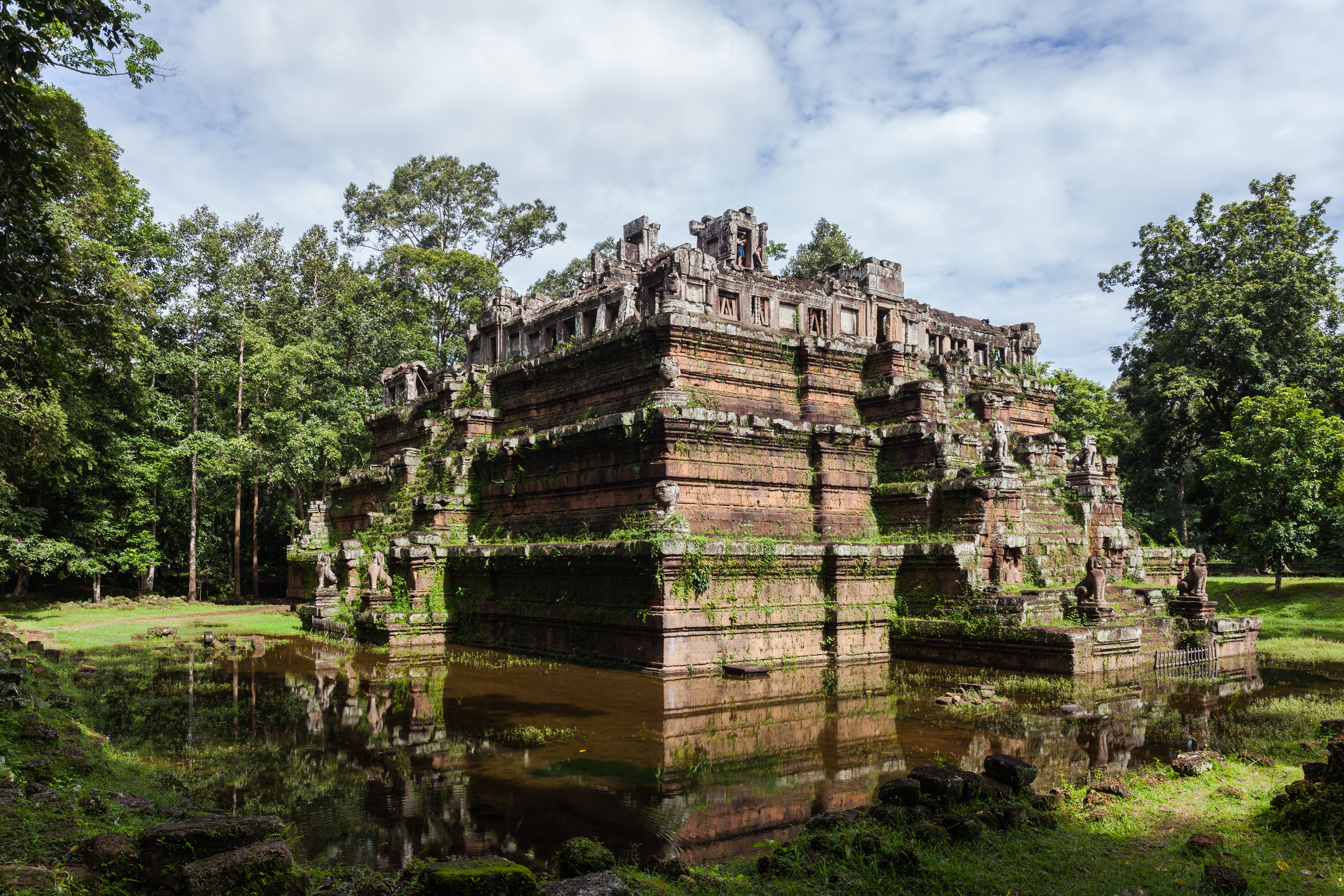

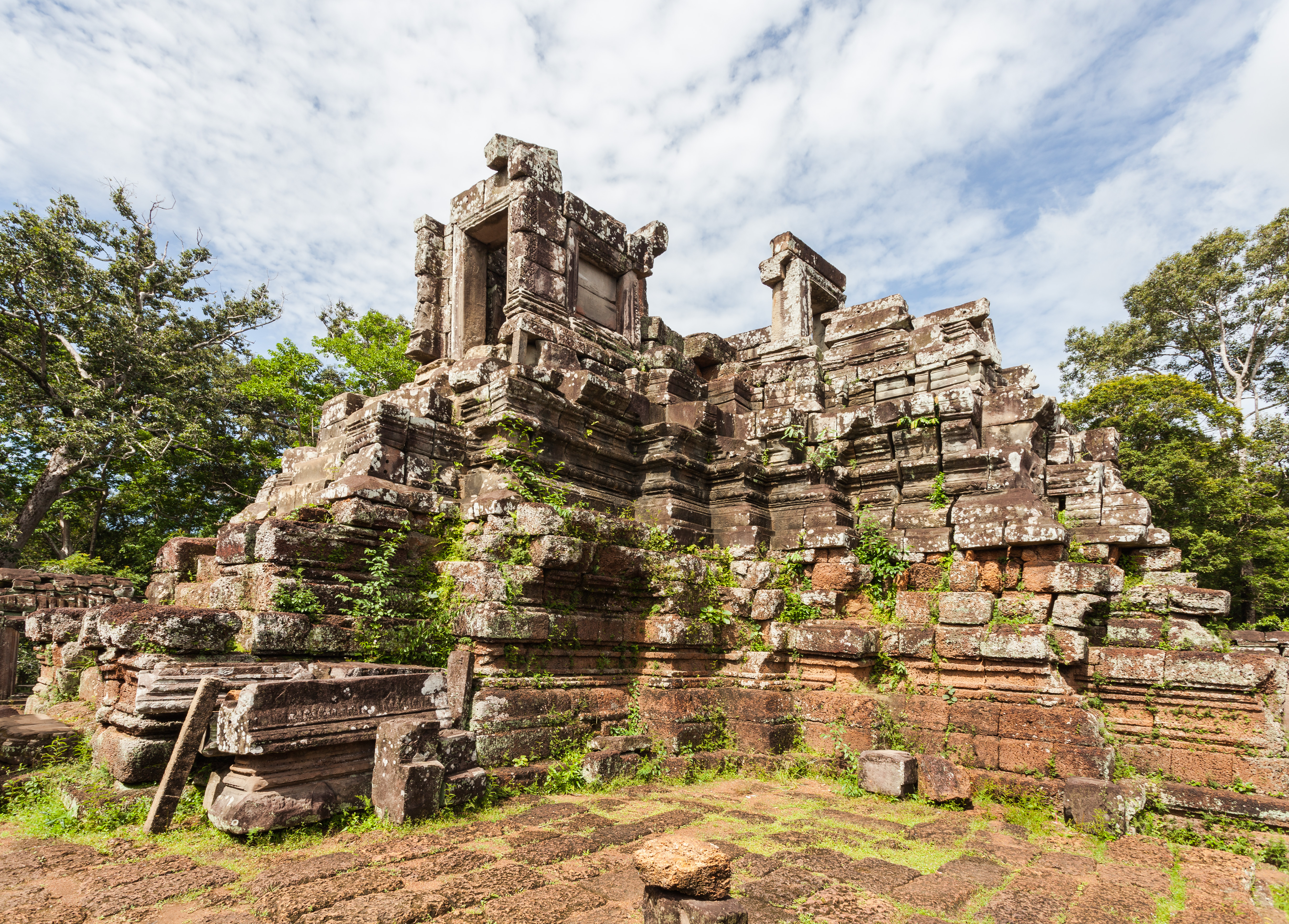

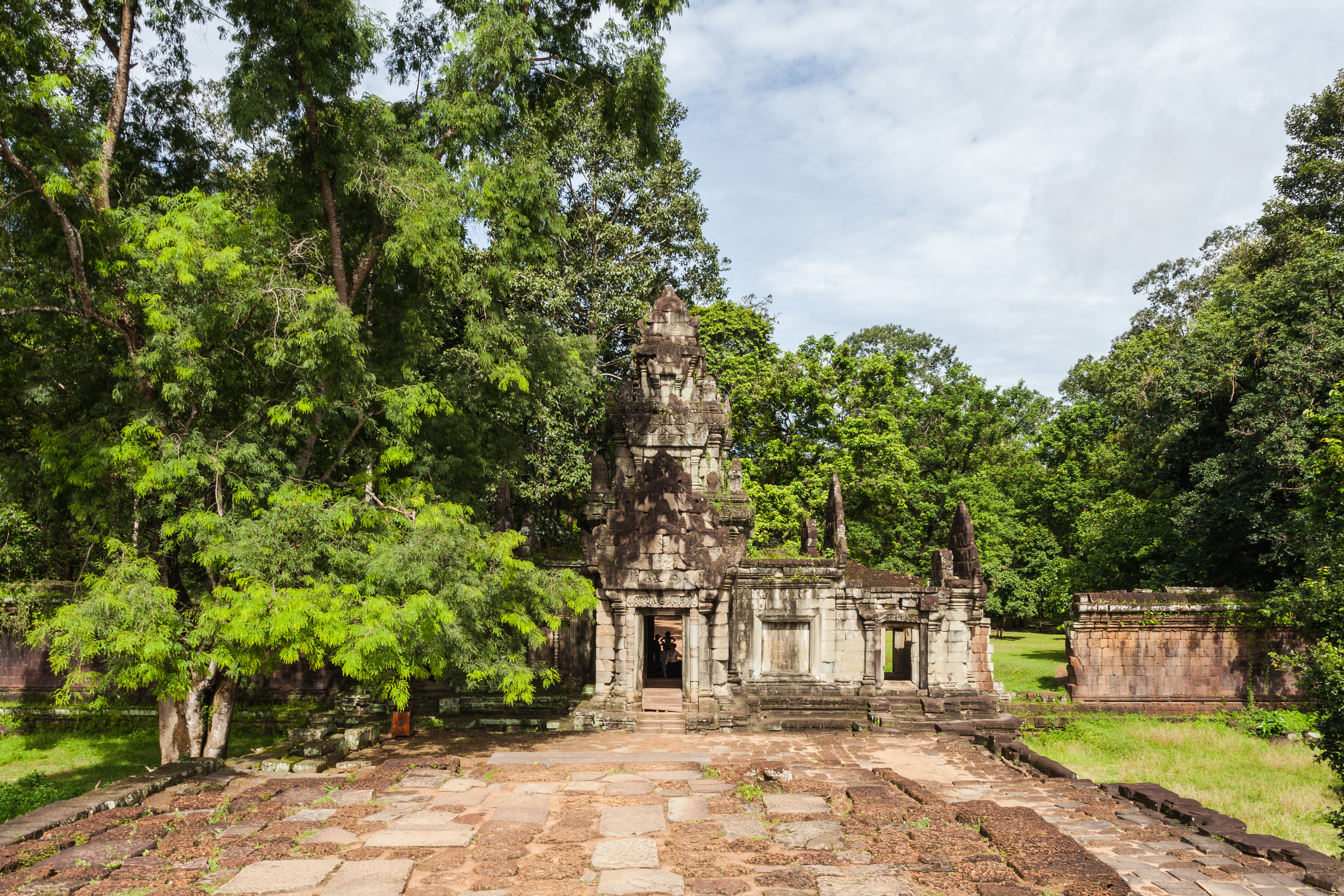

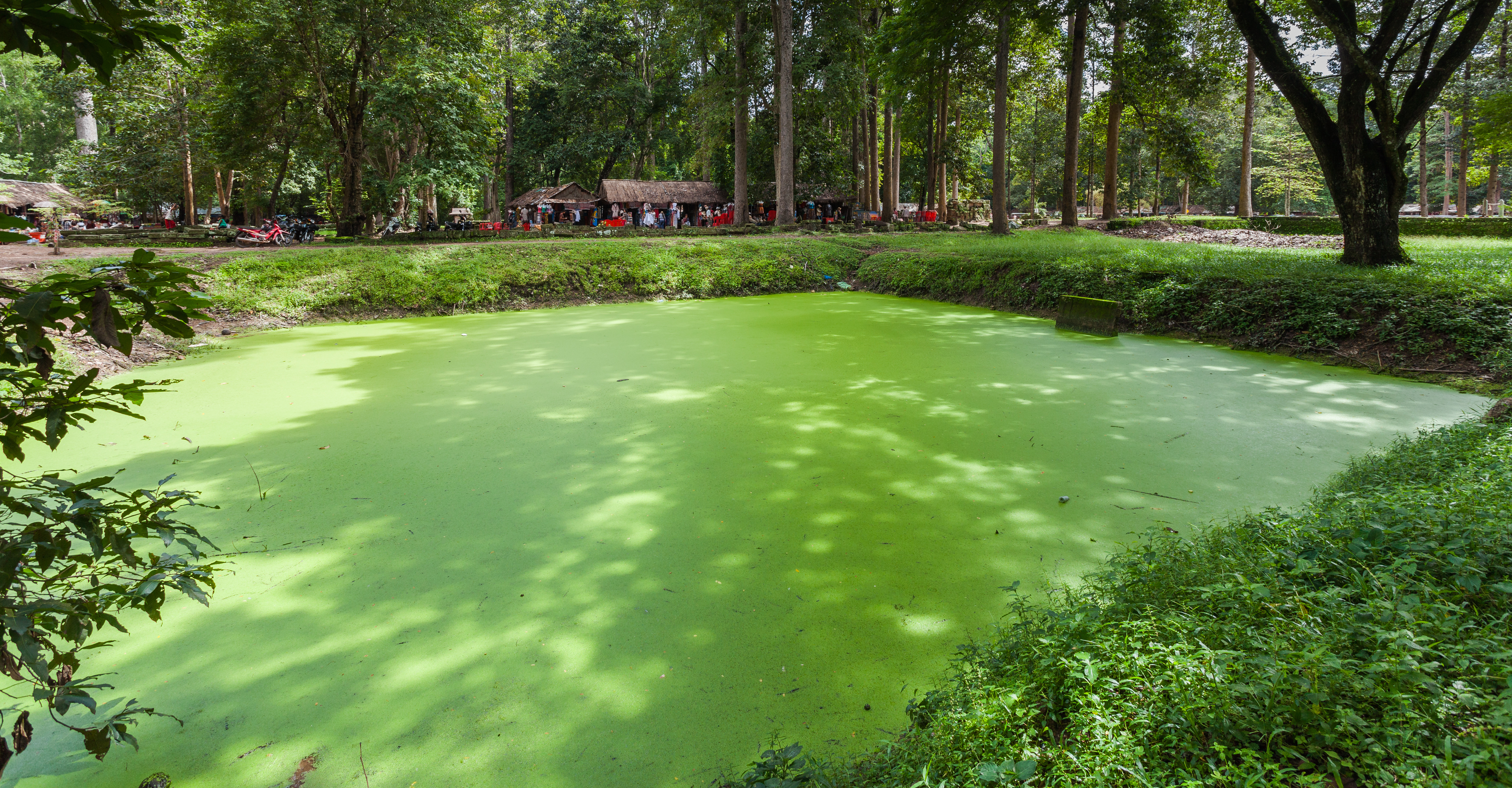
