= Nripatindravarman III =

Lavo king (c. 1181–1218)

Nripatindravarman III ន្ឫបតីន្ទ្រវម៌្មទី៣
- Nripatindradityavarman

King of the Lavo Kingdom, Khmer Empire
- Reign: 1181–1218
- Predecessor: Jayasimhavarman
- Successor: Srindrapatindradityavarman
- Born: Lavo, Khmer Empire
- Died: Angkor, Khmer Empire
Names
- Nrpendradhipativarman
- House: Lavapura
- Dynasty: Varman
- Father: Jayavarman VII
- Mother: Jayarajadevi
- Religion: Mahayana Buddhism

Nripatindravarman III (Khmer: ន្ឫបតីន្ទ្រវម៌្មទី៣, Thai: นฤปตีนทรวรมัน It is possible that Jayasimhavarman was succeeded by a king named Nripatindravarman who reigned in Lavo until 1218. He was possibly an elder brother of Vijayendralakshmi.

== Biography ==
The Prasat Phimeanakas inscription describes the relationship between King Jayavarman VII and Queen Sri Jayarajadevi and Queen Sri Indradevi as his first and second officially appointed consorts and also records the names of King Jayavarman VII's sons, as seen in the text of Verse 57, which mentions a prince of Lavodaya (or Lavodayapura) named "...tindravarman" who was born to Queen Sri Jayarajadevi, as stated in the following inscription: "[...]tindravarman, the lord of Lavodaya (Lopburi), who was as humble as Lava (Rama's son), [...] wished to practice asceticism, but was prevented by her because someone accused him of the evil things mentioned previously." / 57 / This is because the inscription that records the text before the word "...tindravarman" is missing in the inscription, leading Cœdès to assume that the full name of this Prince of Lavo was Nripatindravarman. He was also known as Indravarman. Information about the sons of King Jayavarman VII, as recorded in inscriptions, includes four names: 1) Prince Sri Suryakumara, 2) Prince Sri Virakumara, 3) Prince Srindrakumara, and 4) Nripatindravarman, or Indravarman. Note that the name Indravarman is a homonym for the Prince Srindarakumara, who later succeeded King Jayavarman VII, was named King Indravarman II. Furthermore, some scholars are unsure whether King Indravarman II, who succeeded King Jayavarman VII, was the son of King Jayavarman VII.

The Prasat Phimeanakas inscription identifies Nripatindravarman as the son of King Jayavarman VII. The poet compares Nripatindravarman to the Ramayana character, Lava, who is the son of Rama, who shares his humility. However, the content of the inscription is worth considering. A single short verse in the inscription may raise several questions: Why did the son born of Sri Jayarajadevi have to rule Lavopura, far from Angkor? Did King Jayavarman VII personally send his son to Lavo? And were Prince Nripatindravarman's relatives already in Lavo?

The Prasat Phimeanakas inscription indicates that King Jayavarman VII married Queen Sri Jayarajadevi and Queen Sri Indradevi. The difference is that the marriage of King Jayavarman VII to Queen Sri Jayarajadevi occurred before King Jayavarman VII's coronation. He then separated from his queen to travel to Champa, thus estranging their relationship. The marriage of King Jayavarman VII to Queen Sri Indradevi occurred during King Jayavarman VII's accession to the throne. The inscription does not indicate that Queen Sri Indradevi fathered a son with King Jayavarman VII, but it does suggest that Queen Sri Jayarajadevi fathered a son with King Jayavarman VII, Nripatindravarman. The relationship between Nripatindravarman and King Jayavarman VII may not have been intimate. Because the inscription records that Nripatindravarman did not reside in the city of Angkor, but in the city of Lavo during the reign of King Jayavarman VII.

Regnal titles
Preceded by Jayasimhavarman	King of Lavo Kingdom, Khmer Empire; 1181–1218	Succeeded by Srindrapatindradityavarman

== Bibliography ==
- G. Coedès (1968), The Indianized States of Southeast Asia, Honolulu: University of Hawaii Press
