= Prasat Prang Ku, Sisaket province =

Khmer Buddhist temple

Prasat Prang Ku
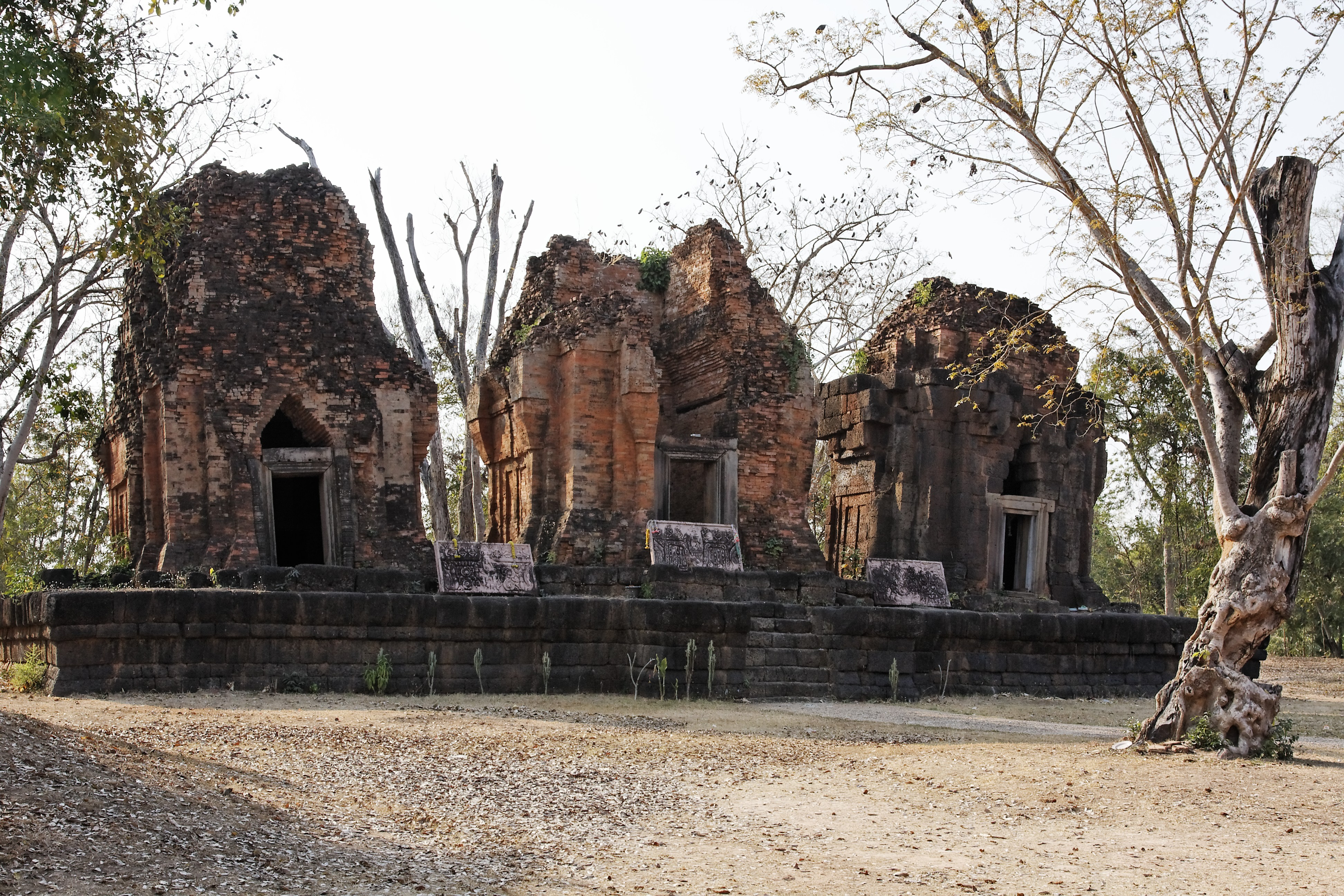

Religion
- Affiliation: Mahayana Buddhism
- District: Prang Ku
- Province: Sisaket
- Deity: The Buddha

Location
- Location: Ban Ku village
- Country: Thailand
- Interactive map of Prasat Prang Ku
- Coordinates: 14.78981°N 104.05108°E

Architecture
- Type: Khmer
- Creator: Jayavarman VII
- Completed: Late 12th to early 13th century

Prasat Prang Ku, is an ancient Khmer Buddhist temple in Prang Ku district, Sisaket province, Thailand. Built during the late 12th or early 13th century in the Khmer architectural style, it served as a temple and a hospital.

== Description ==
Built in the late 12th to early 13th century during the reign of Jayavarman VII in the Khmer Bayon architectural style, the temple is in Ban Ku village, Prang Ku district. It served as a Arogayasala or hospital, providing medical as well as religious services, one of many such buildings built by Jayavarman VII.

The site consists of three towers built on the same laterite base arranged in a north–south direction. The central principal tower and the south tower are made of brick and the north tower of laterite, each with door frames and lintels made from sandstone. The buildings were situated within an enclosure with gopura or entrance pavilions. Outside the walls is a Srah or pond. The site was registered as an historic site by the Fine Arts Department in 1935.

== Artefacts ==
Artefacts recovered from the site include three well-preserved, carved lintels in sandstone which have been deposited in Phimai National Museum. Copies of the lintels have been placed at the site at the foot of each tower. The lintel from the central tower shows Indra riding on the bull Nandin above a Kala face disgorging garlands. The northern tower lintel depicts the scene from the Ramayana in which the warrior Indrajit binds Rama and Lakshmana with snakes (Nagapasha) surrounded by sorrowful monkeys. The southern lintel shows Vishnu with four arms holding a conch, shell, discus, lotus flower and mace, standing on Garuda resting on two lions.

== Gallery ==
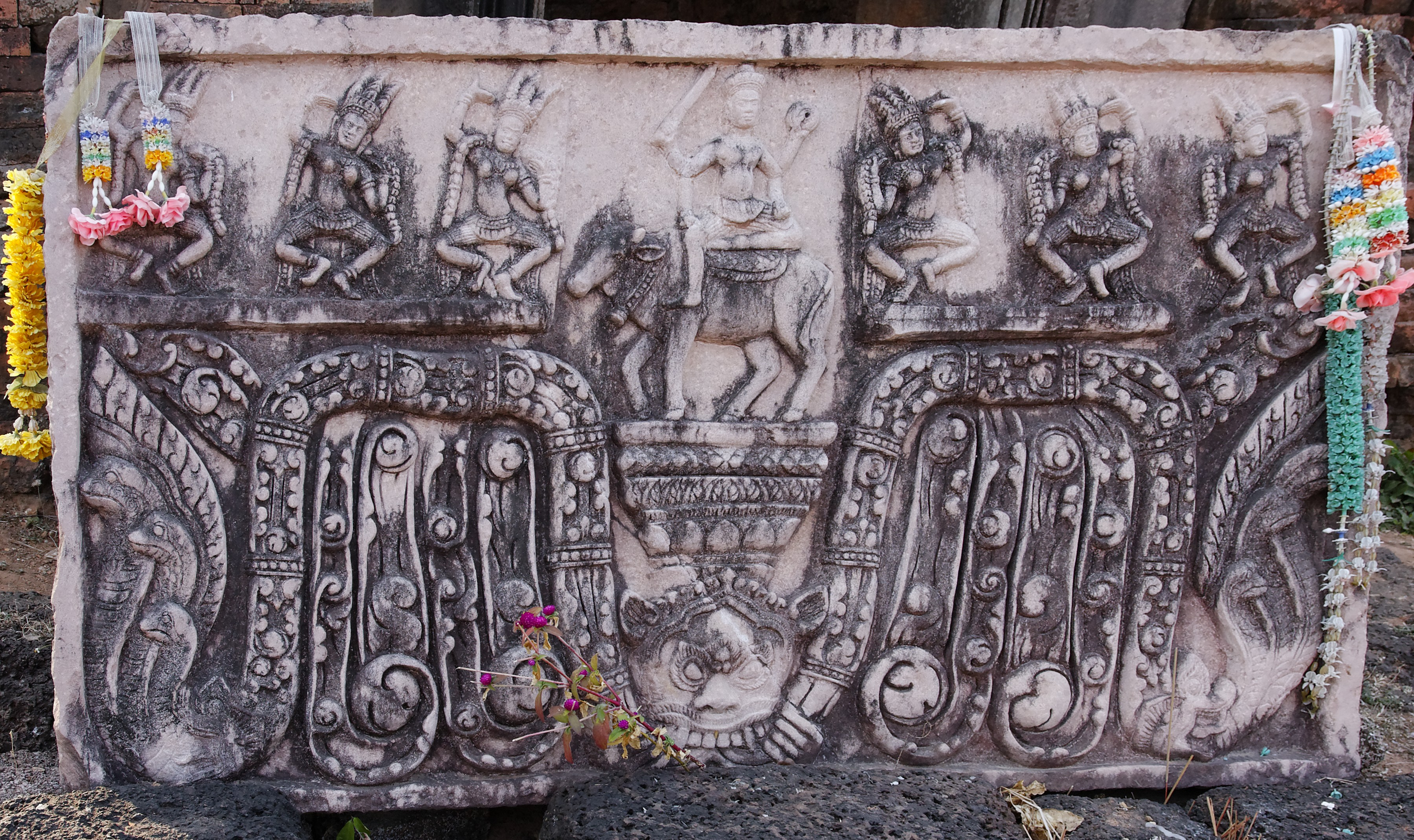
Lintel (copy), central tower, depicting Indra on Nandin

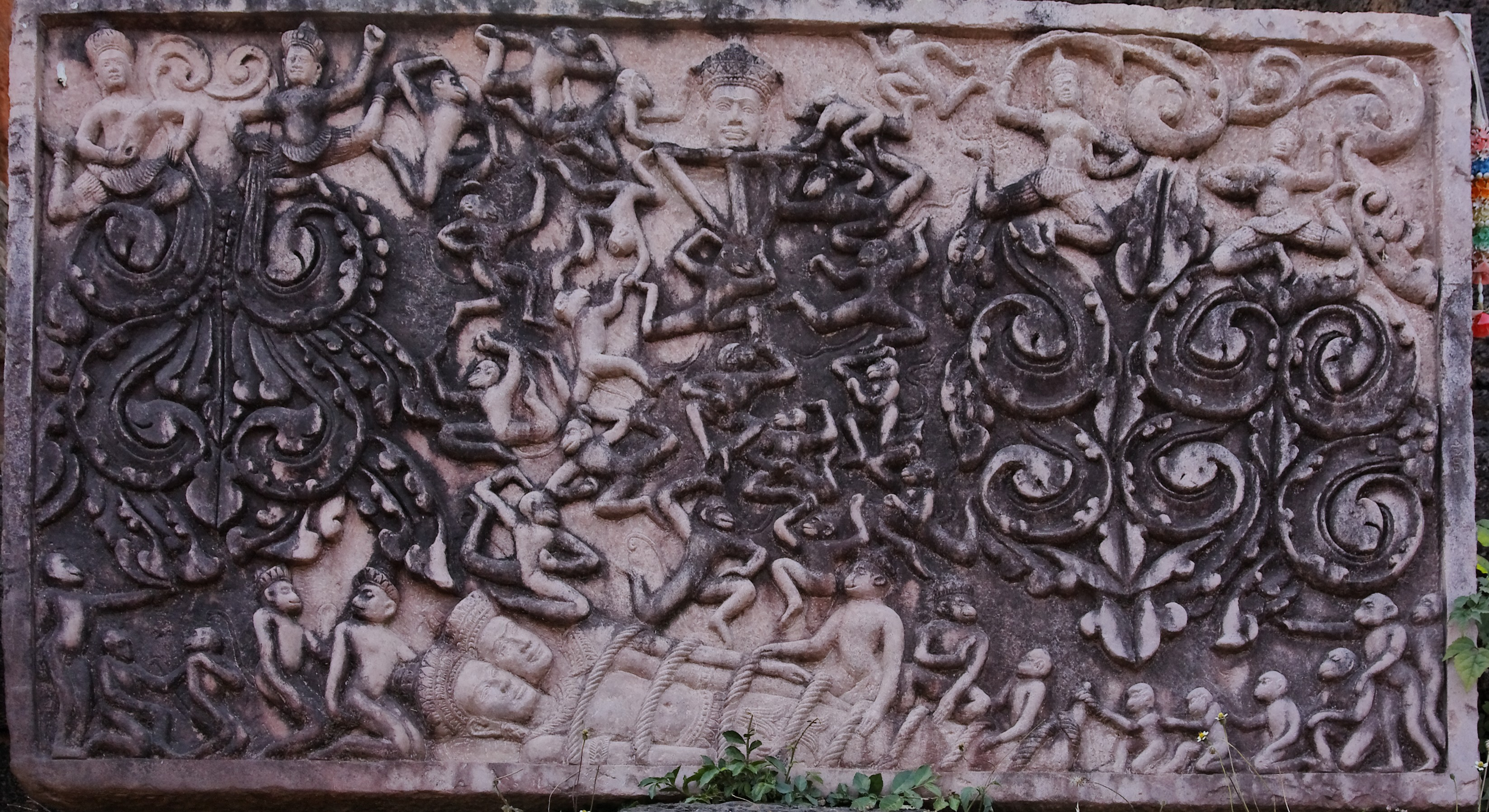
Lintel (copy), north tower, depicting Rama and Lakshmana bound by Indrajit

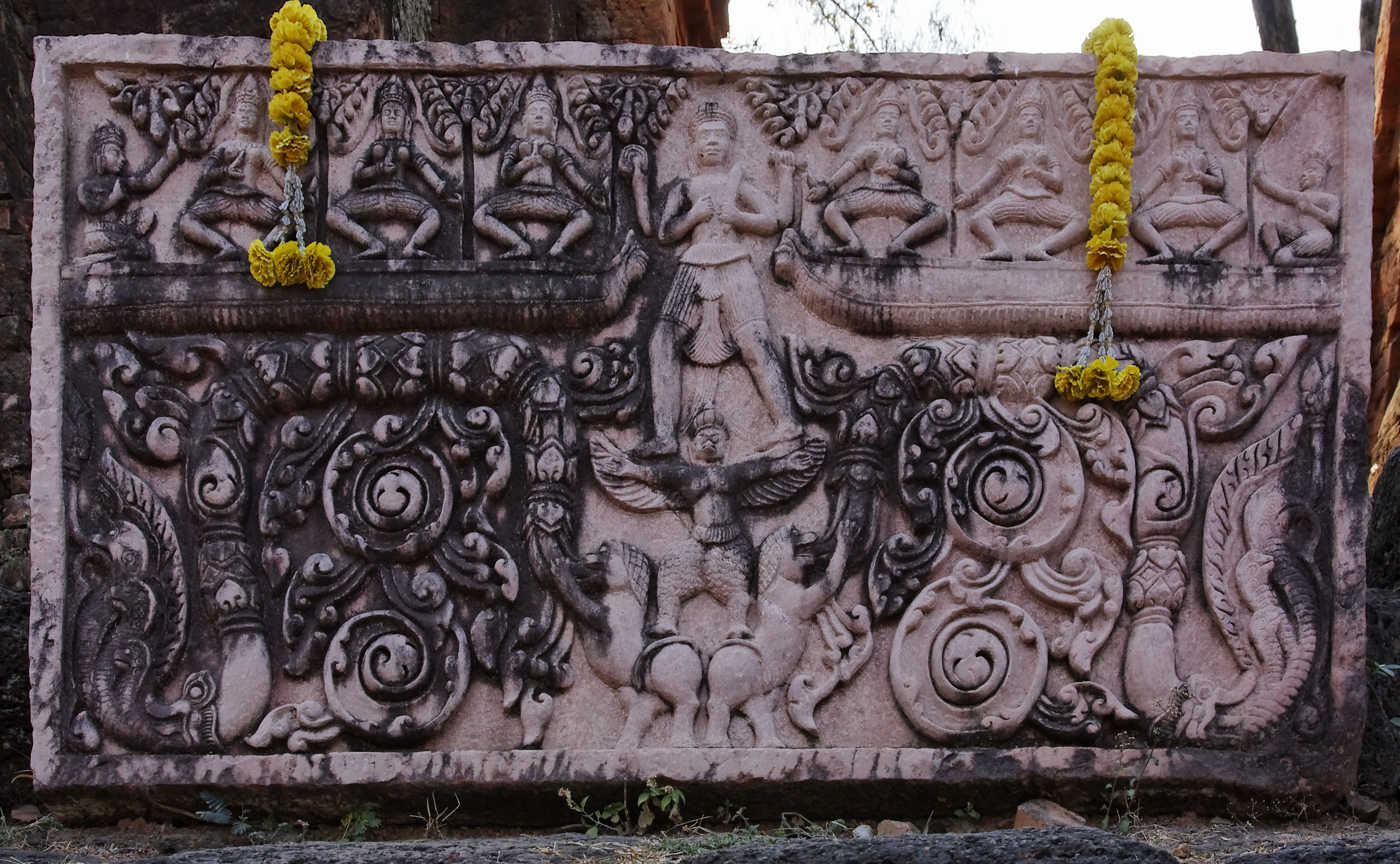
Lintel (copy), south tower, depicting Vishnu standing on Garuda

== See also ==
- Jayavarman VII
- Khmer architecture
- Arogayasala
- Khmer Empire
