= Hiranyavarman =

Founder of the Mahidharapura Dynasty

Mahidharapura Dynasty
- Successor: Dharanindravarman I
- Born: Upper Mun Valley near Phimai
- Spouse: Hiranyalakshmi
- Issue: Dharanindravarman I; Jayavarman VI; (Male); Yuvaraja; Dharanindrarajalakshmi
Names
- Hiranyavarman
- Religion: Hindu

Hiranyavarman (Khmer: ហិរណ្យវរ្ម័ន, Thai: หิรัณยวรมัน), the founder of the Mahidharapura Dynasty, was a king from the Upper Mun Valley near Phimai (northern region of Phnom Dangrek), a vassal state of Khmer Empire.

== Biography ==
King Hiranyavarman was the father of King Dharanindravarman I (r. 1107–1113) and King Jayavarman VI (r. 1082-1107). He never claimed that his dynasty has any link to the King Suryavarman I’s dynasty nor to any other lines of Khmer kings. However, his great-grandson, Dharanindravarman II claimed the throne through the marriage with Sri Jayarajacudamani, granddaughter of King Suryavarman I.

He was named after Hiranyavarman, a son of Somasaman and a daughter of King Viravarman.^{[1]}

Unknown	Head of Mahidharapura; Unknown	Succeeded by Dharanindravarman I
