= Banteay Samré =

- ប្រាសាទបន្ទាយសំរែ
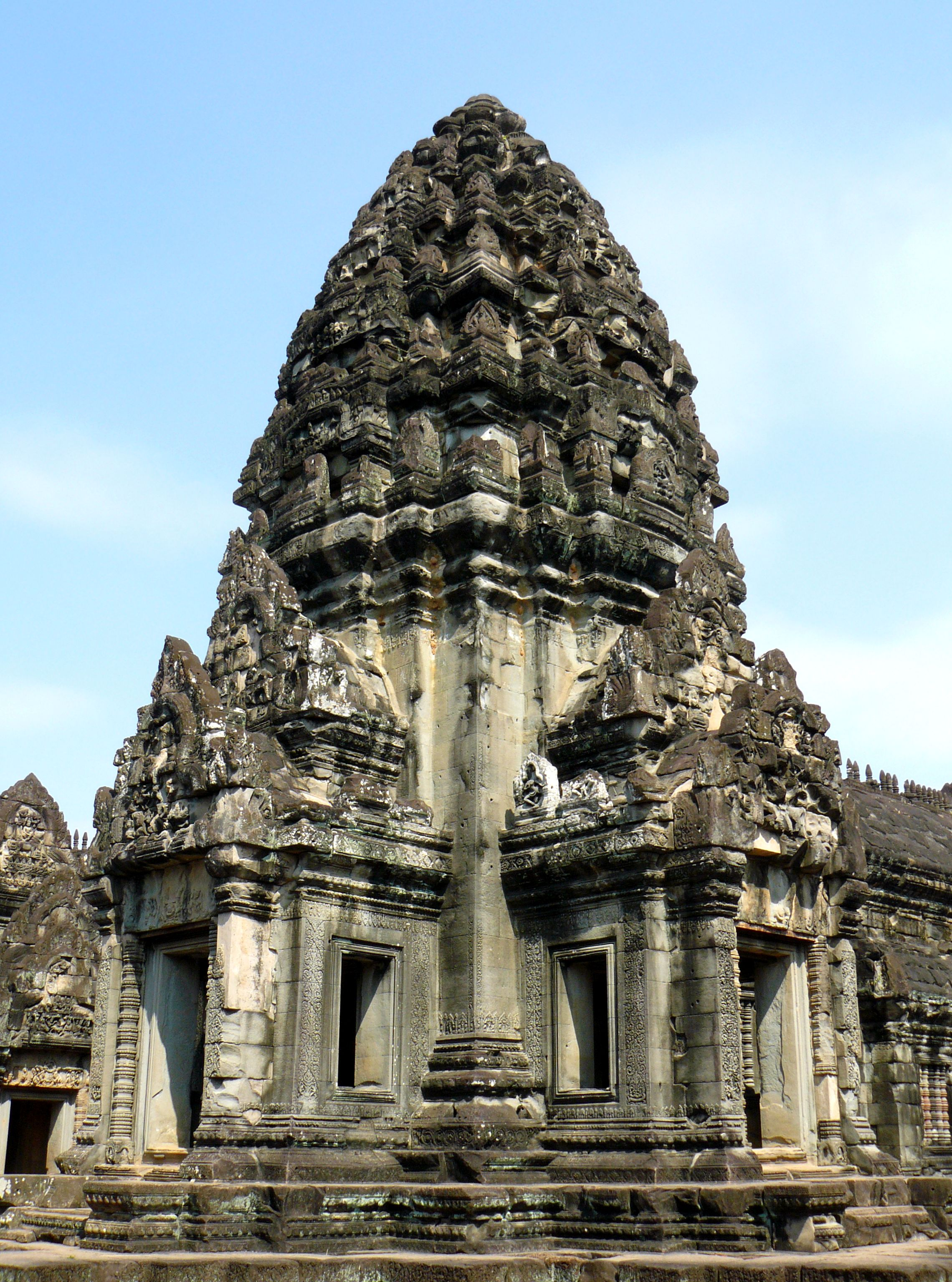
- The central tower of the temple

- Location in Cambodia

Religion
- Affiliation: Hinduism
- Province: Siem Reap

Location
- Location: Angkor
- Country: Cambodia
- Interactive map of Banteay Samré
- Coordinates: 13°26′32″N 103°57′33″E

Architecture
- Type: Khmer (Angkor Wat style)
- Creator: Suryavarman II, continued by Yasovarman II
- Completed: First half of the 12th century

Banteay Samré (Khmer: បន្ទាយសំរែ [ɓɑntiəj sɑmrae]; "The Citadel of the Samré") is a temple at Angkor, Cambodia, located 400 metres to the east of the East Baray. Built during the reign of Suryavarman II and Yasovarman II in the early 12th century, it is a Hindu temple in the Angkor Wat style.

Named after the Samré, an ancient people of Indochina, the temple uses the same materials as the Banteay Srei.

Banteay Samré was excellently restored by Maurice Glaize from 1936 until 1944. The design of its single ogival tower is immediately recognizable as Angkor Wat style along with other temples in the region such as Thommanon and Chau Say Tevoda. Due to this temple's similarity to some monuments of north-east Thailand, it has the appearance of a compact Phimai. While there are no inscriptions describing its foundation, it seems likely to have been built by a high official of the court during the reign of King Suryavarman II.

== Plan ==
It has a single tower over the shrine and this is connected by an antarala to a mandapa. All of this is flanked by two libraries, and two concentric gallery enclosures surround the ensemble. Banteay Samré is approached by a 200 metre long raised causeway from the east. This suggests that the temple enclosed a reasonable sized town. An avenue of 350 metres leads from the East Baray, ending in another cruciform terrace at the west side of the temple. The outer enclosure wall is 6 metres high and the inner enclosure has gopuras at the cardinal points.

== Gallery ==
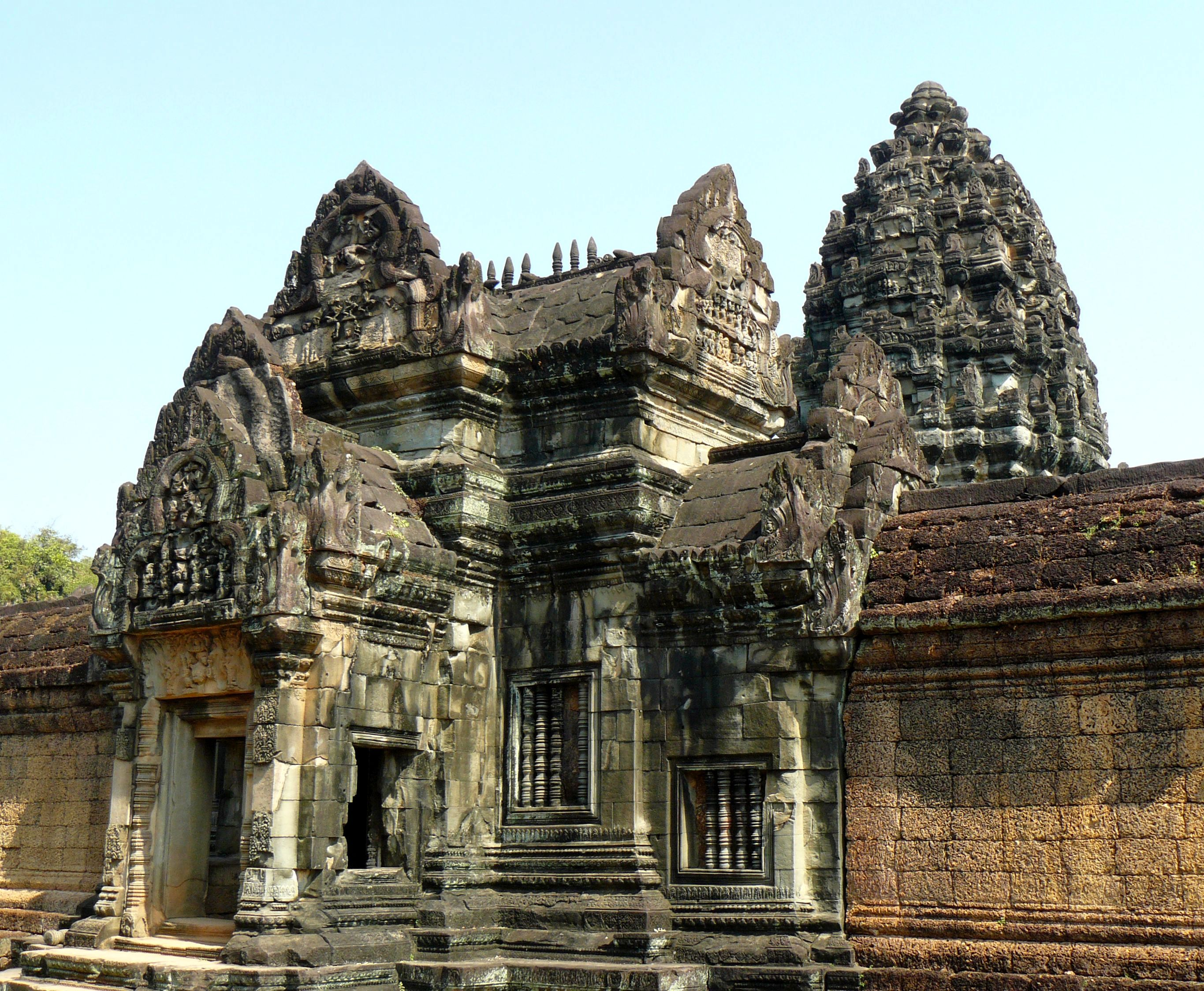

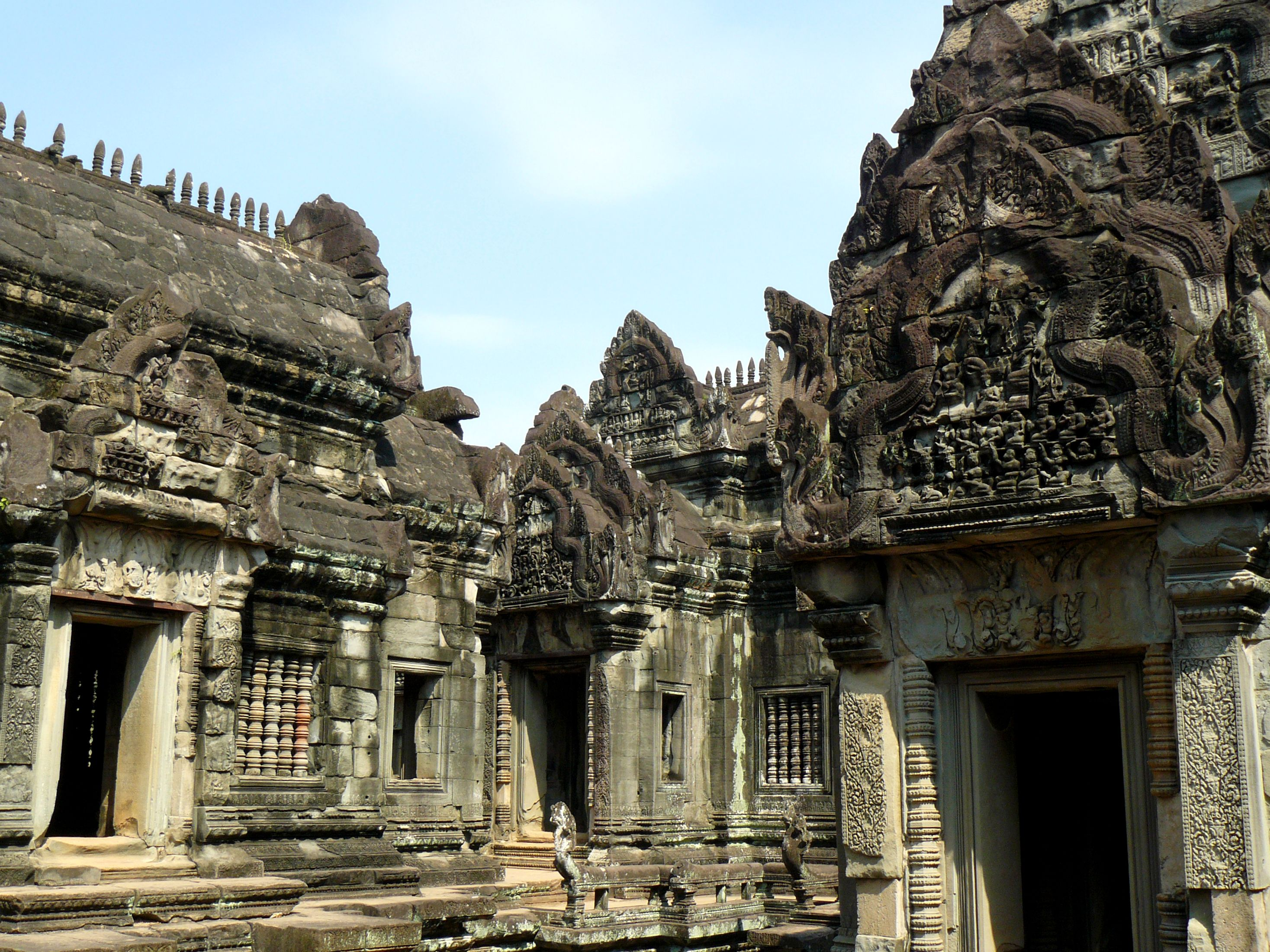

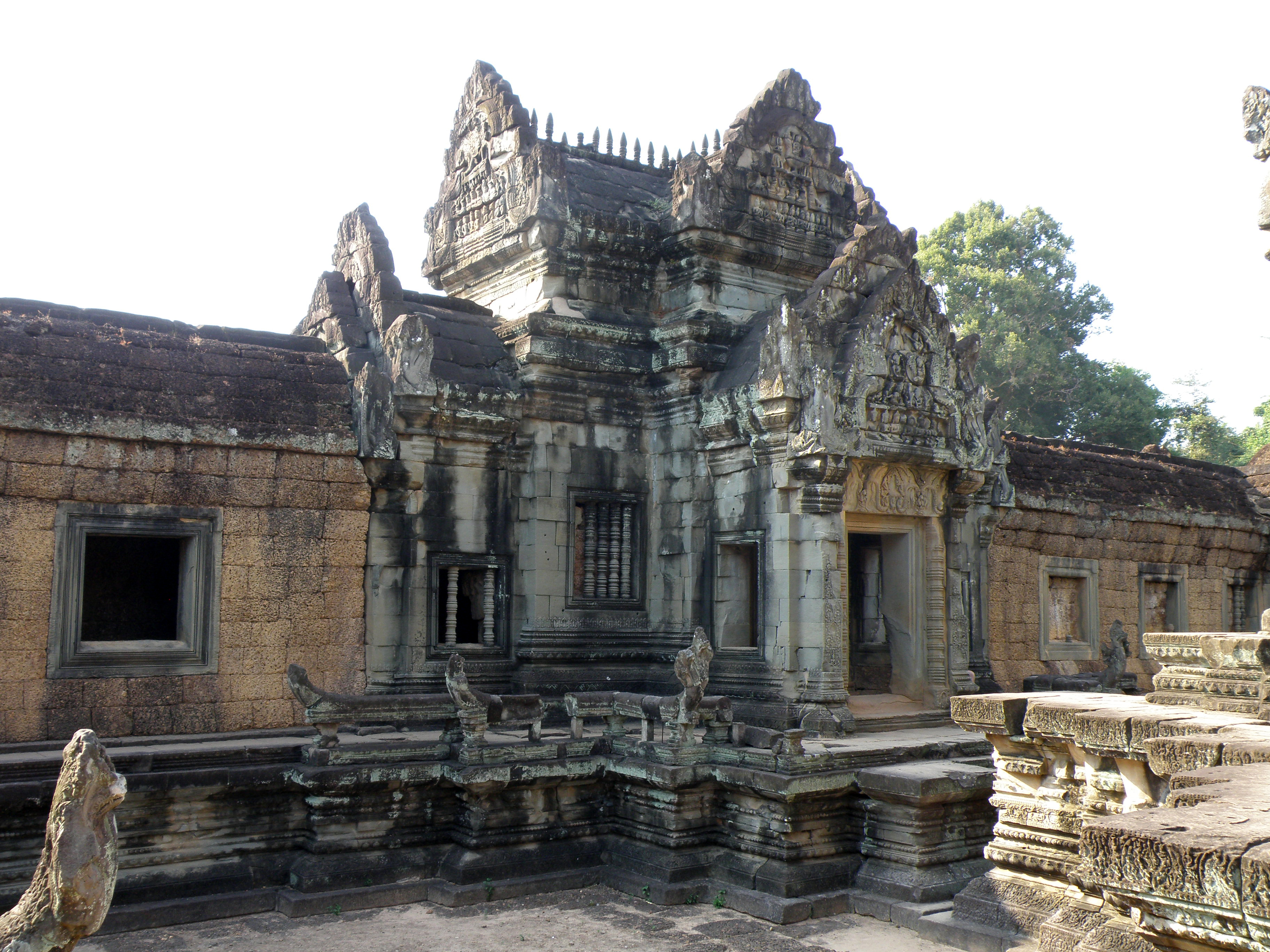

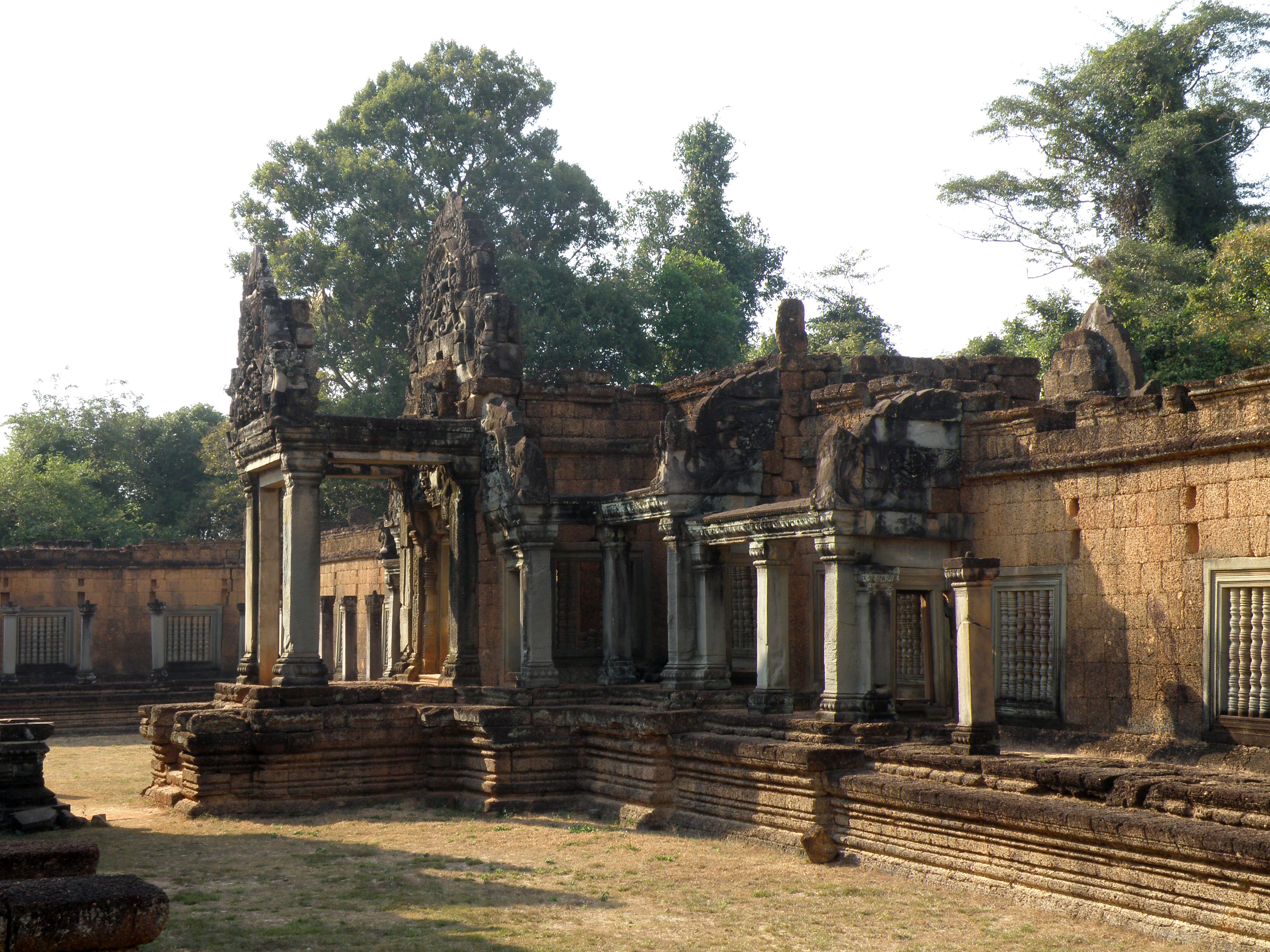

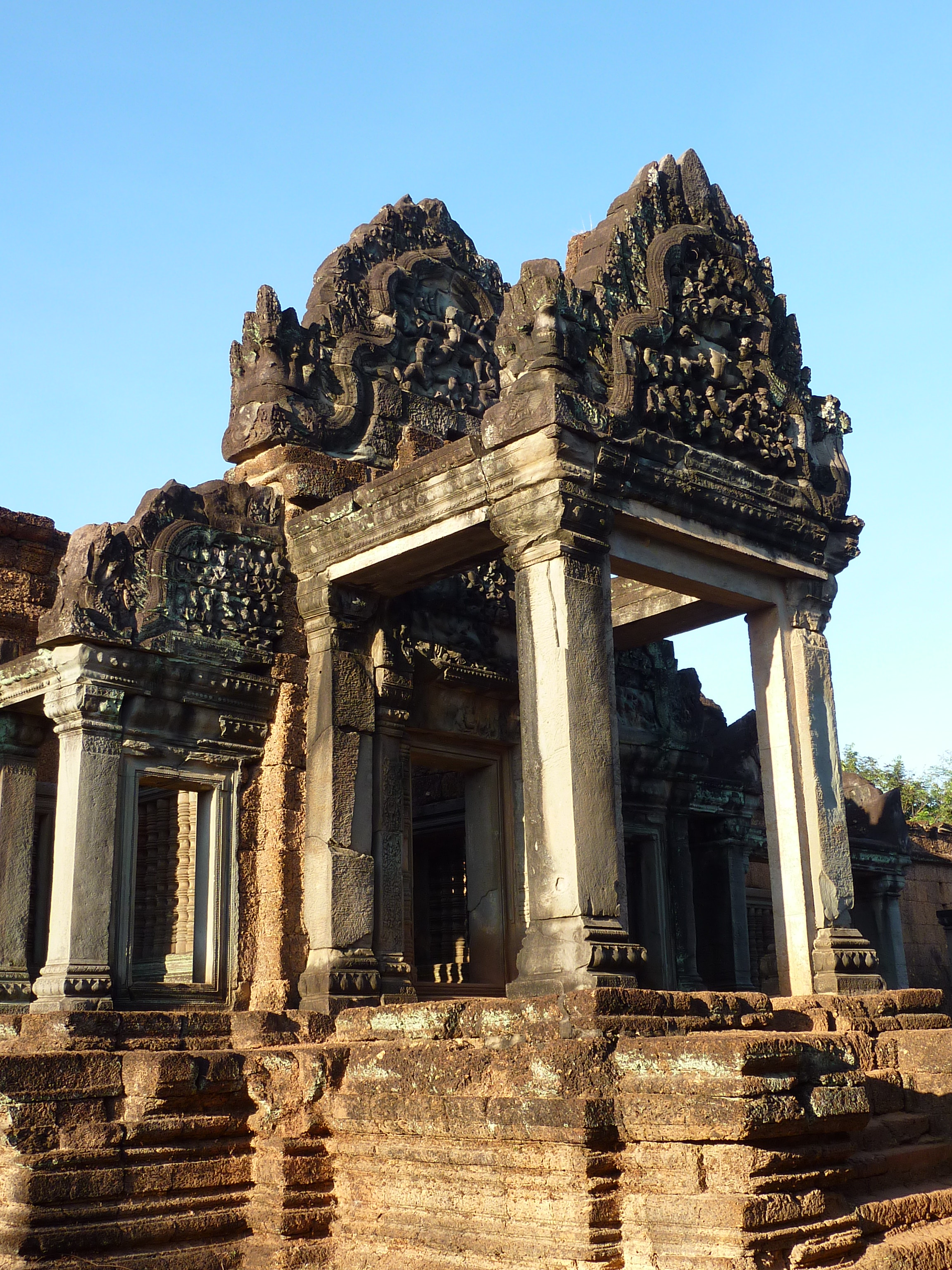

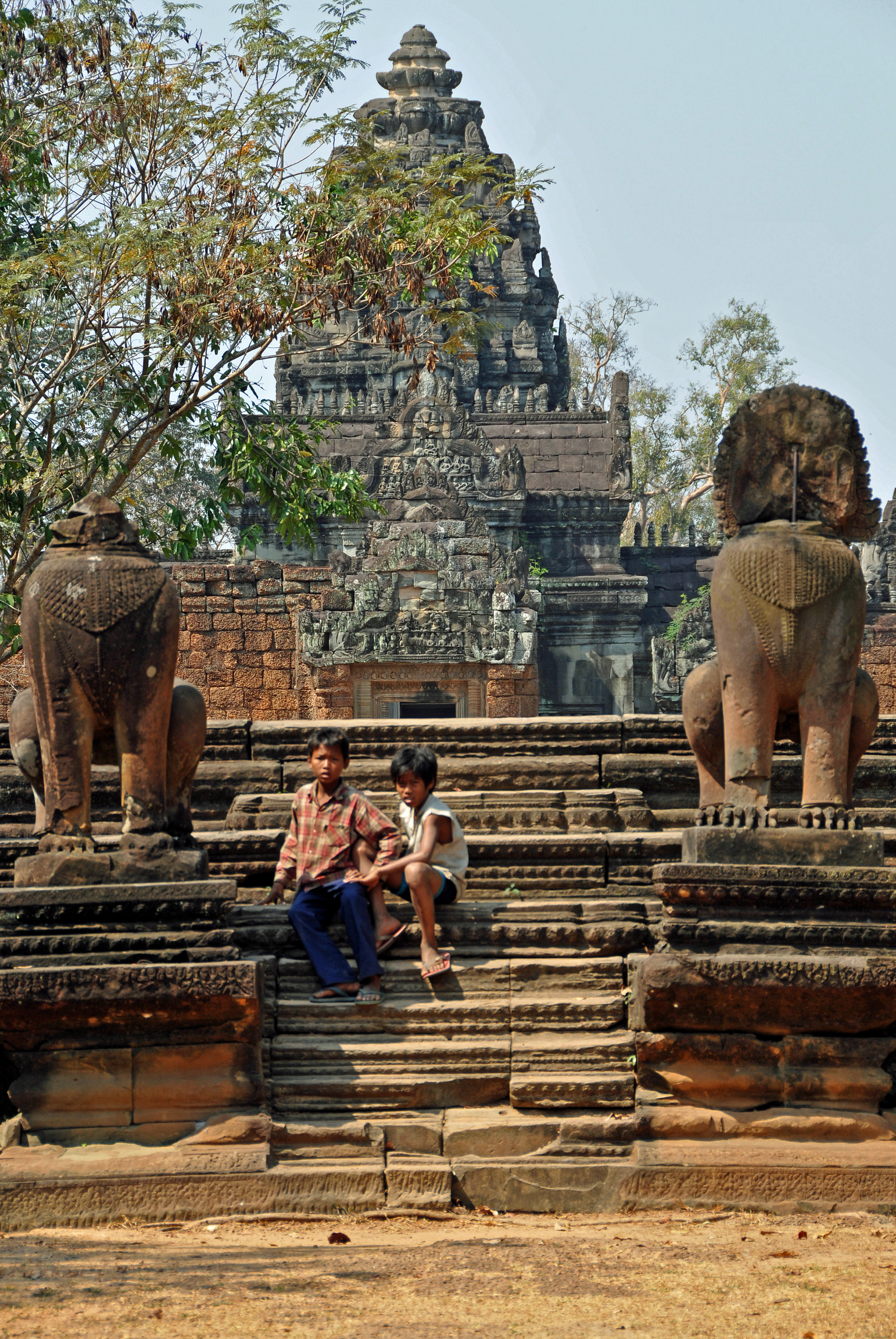

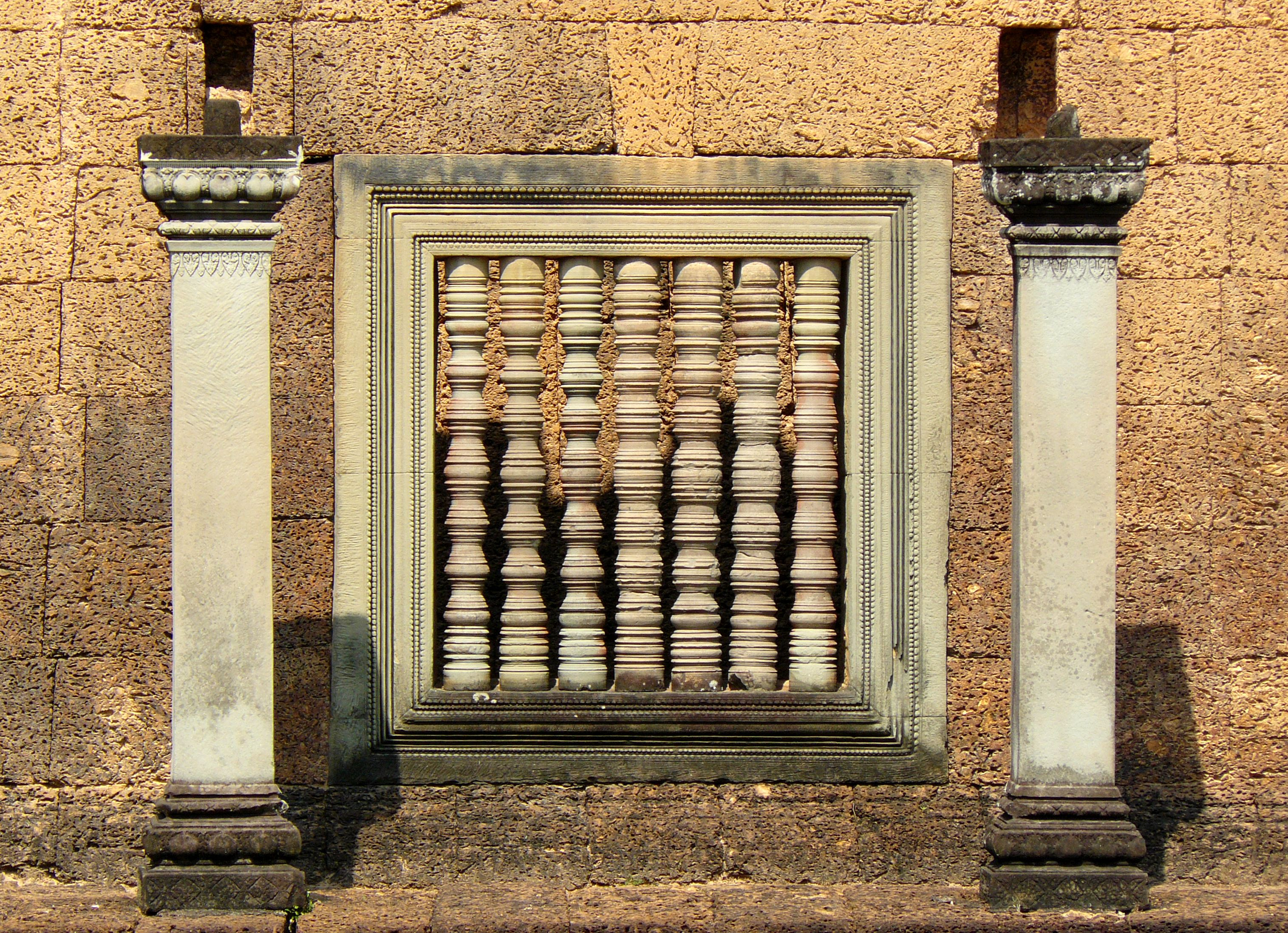

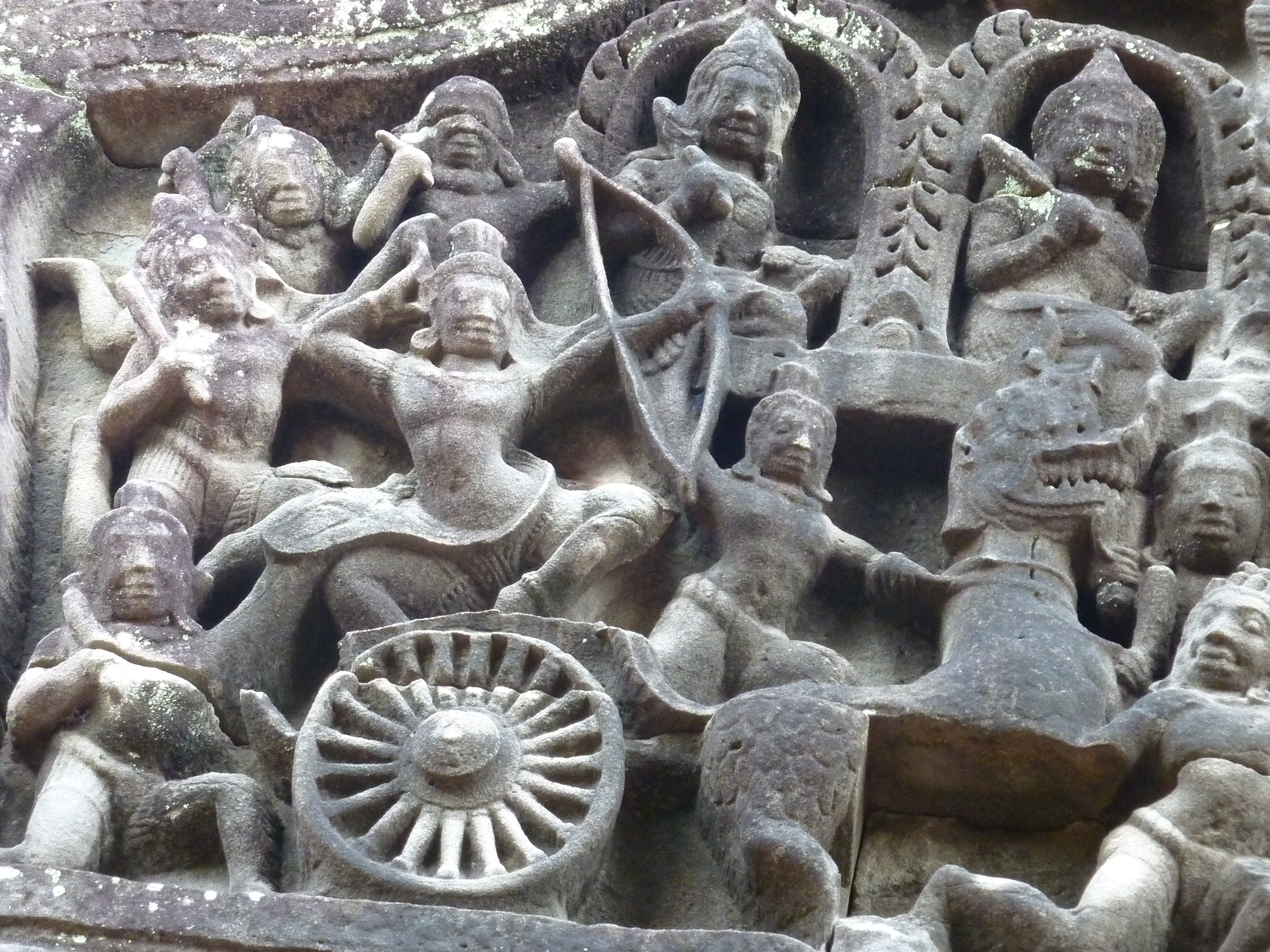
