= Tonle Bati =

Lake in Cambodia

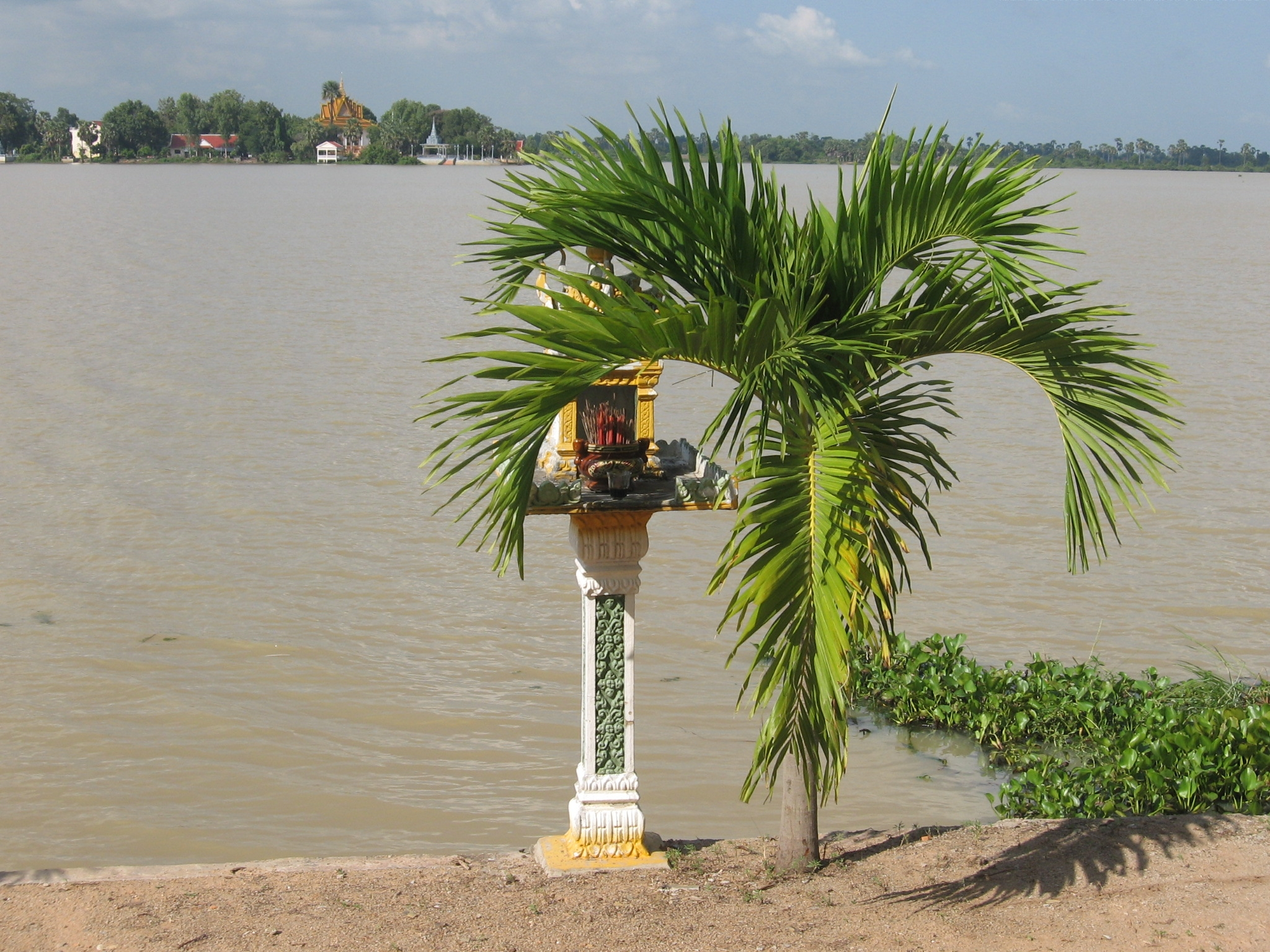
- Tonle Bati Lake, near Phnom Penh - panoramio

- Location within Cambodia Location within Asia
- Location: Takéo Province
- Coordinates: 11.34°N 104.85°E
- Basin countries: Cambodia

Tonle Bati (Khmer: ទន្លេបាទី) is a small lake about 30 km south of Phnom Penh, the capital of Cambodia. It is a popular weekend destination for the local population. It is also a popular fishing spot for both tourists and people who live locally.

Close to the lake, there is the Ta Prohm of Bati, one of several shelters built in Cambodia and Thailand during the reign of Jayavarman VII to house the Jayabuddhamahanatha statues. It is located off the highway to Takéo Province.

The word Jayabuddhamahanatha means "Victory-Buddha-Great Saviour" and may refer to the defeat of the Chams by the king Jayavarman VII. A similar sculpture was found at the Vihar Prampil Lveng on the Avenue of Victory at Angkor Thom.

20 minutes south of the lake there is another temple called Phnom Chisor (Khmer: ភ្នំជីសូរ). It is situated on a mountain top which requires a visitor to climb 461 steps.
