= Bust of Jayavarman VII =

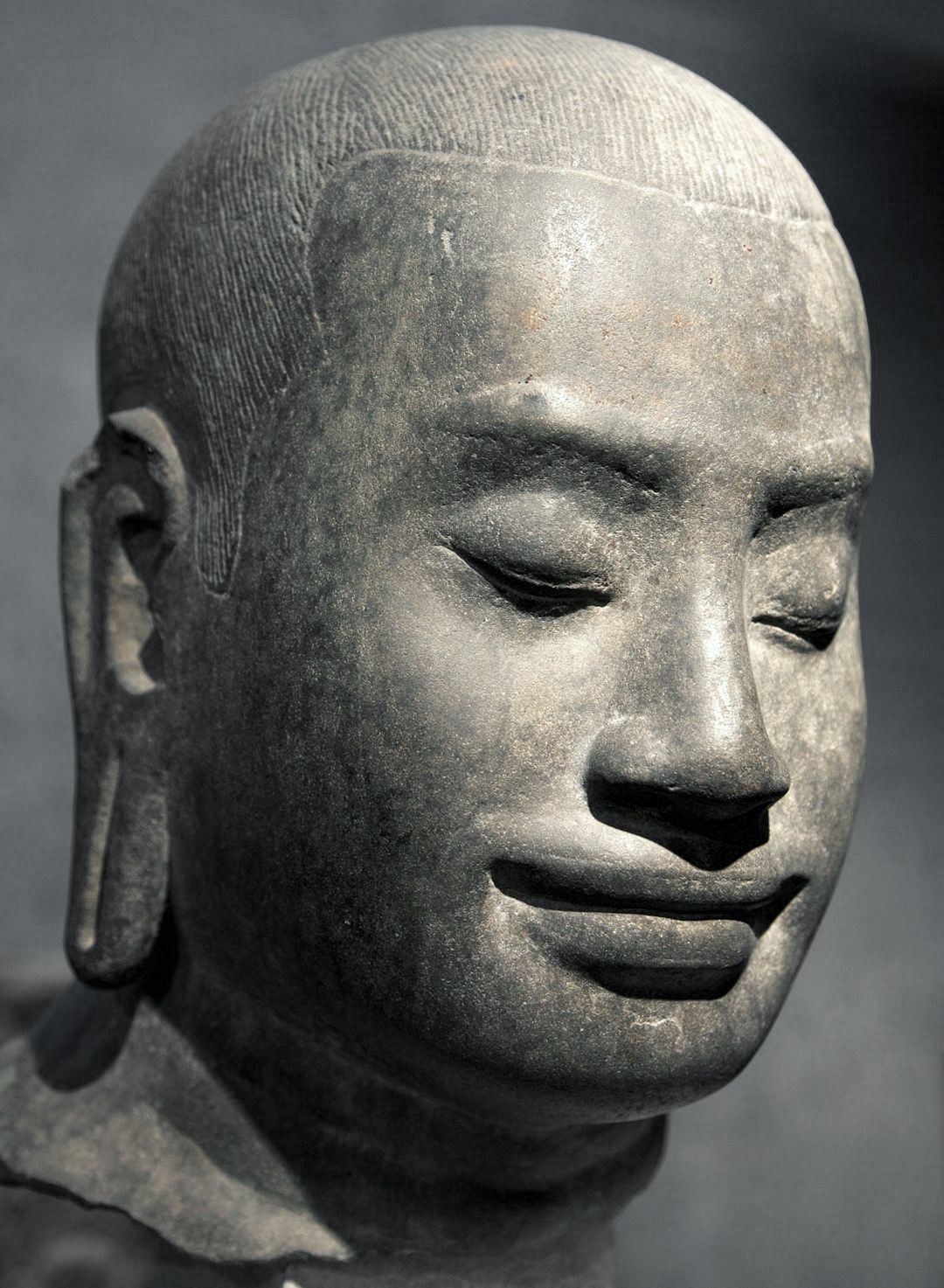
- The location of the statue today Click on the map to see marker.
- Year: 12th-13th century
- Type: Green sandstone
- Subject: Jayavarman VII
- Dimensions: 42 cm × 25 cm (17 in × 9.8 in)
- Designation: P430
- Location: Guimet Museum, Paris; 48°51′55″N 2°17′38″E

The portrait of Jayavarman VII is a stone bust carved in Angkor during the late 12th or early 13th century representing Jayavarman VII and currently conserved at the Guimet Museum in Paris. It is one of the landmarks of the aesthetics of the Bayon style.

== Description ==
The bust of Jayavarman VII is a grey-green sandstone head, with downcast eyes and a faint smile. The hairstyle, with the hair pulled into a small round bun at the top of the skull, makes it possible to identify the subject as being a man; the four squatting men sculpted on the pediment of the temple of Banteay Srei, kept at the Guimet museum, have practically the same hairstyle. The square face with full cheeks suggests that the character of Angkor is middle-aged. He wears no adornment and displays a meditative expression. The upper lip, a little longer than the lower lip, seems to protrude slightly; this would make one think that he had his teeth slightly forward, unless this effect is due to the flat mustache which surmounts this lip. The stretched ears indicate that this man usually wore heavy earrings.

== Identification of the « statue-portraits» of King Jayavarman VII ==
Four fragmentary statues representing Jayavarman VII have been found in various places within his Empire, at Angkor, at Preah Khan of Kompong Svay and at Phimai, in Thailand. In these various portraits, though his main traits are very similar, Jayavarman VII appears more or less young, as if these sculptures had been made at different times in his life. The sculptures from Angkor, found between 1910 and 1931, show him obviously older.

=== Seated portrait of Phimai ===
In the early 20th century, the seated statue of Jayavarman VII in Phimai, with a kneeling woman, was considered to be a representation of Brahmadatta, the legendary ruler of Benares, who ruled during the previous lives of the Buddha Shakyamuni according to the Jataka Tales. This statue was found in a laterite tower dating back to the reign of Jayavarman VII in the south-east part of the Phimai complex.

=== Seated portrait of Krol Romeas ===
In 1924, the body of a statue and later in 1931, a matching head were identified as a second seated statue of Jayavarman VII. As soon as 1935, Georges Coedes suggested that this statue could instead represent the Khmer ruler Jayavarman VII based on the similarities found with his representations in the bas-relief of the Bayon and Banteay Chhmar.

=== Seated portrait of the Preah Khan of Kampong Svay ===
Another similar head was found in 1958 in his stronghold of Jayavarman VII, the Preah Khan of Kompong Svay, in which he is represented slightly younger and less corpulent. His identification decisively corroborated the fact that this head was that if Jayavarman VII. The mutilated body matching that head was found in 2000.

=== Bust in the Musee Guimet ===
The bust kept in the Musee Guimet was presumed to be Jayavarman VII since Etienne de La Jonquiere who relied on the proximity of its original place in the Ta Prohm and a 2,60 meter inscription in Sanskrit of the time of Jayavarman VII. It was only recognized in the 2010s as a bust of Jayavarman VII by consensus of the scientific community as the bust of Jayavarman VII originating from Ta Prohm.

== History ==
=== Portraying Jayavarman VII ===
The representations of Khmer kings were exceptional during the Khmer Empire. Two representations of Suryavarman II have come down to us, as enthroned sovereign and as army commander, in the so-called “historical” bas-relief in the gallery of the third enclosure of his temple at Angkor Wat. Jayavarman VII is the only other Khmer king whose portraits are known.

With the religious changes imposed by Jayavarman VII who was the first Khmer leader to embrace Mahayana Buddhism, Khmer art was given a new direction. Tempered realism was the characteristic of this new style. Though its physical shape is idealized and radiates spiritual intensity, its humanistic style is emblematic of the shift from the myths of Hinduism to the ethos of Buddhism.

=== Observing Ta Prohm ===
In 1911, Etienne Lunet de Lajonquiere noticed that the statue of Ta Prohm, which his predecessors had been guided to by the local Khmer who honored it as a neak ta, had been taken away. Locals identified the bust with Brahma but the French explorers dissented and believed it represented a king or prince, most probably Jayavarman VII.

=== Excavating the bust of King Ta Prohm ===
The first archeological study of the bust of Jayavarman VII was published by Alfred Foucher in 1912. He considered it among the most beautiful artefacts of ancient Khmer sculpture. The statue was given to French botanist Édouard Marie Heckel by Auguste Coreil who had been in Cambodia for the first time in 1885 to secure the French protectorate. At that time, the scholarly interest shifted towards the seated statues of Jayavarman VII found both in Cambodia and in Thailand.

Meanwhile, the bust of Jayavarman VII was transferred to the Colonial Museum of Marseille until it shut down in 1962 and the head was deposited at the Musee Guimet in 1965 through the intervention of Philippe Stern.

In 2000, Pottier emitted the possibility that a torso corresponding to this bust was found within the third circular wall of Ta Prohm.

=== Caught between the traffic of antiquities and the souvenir shop ===
Since the 1990s, within Cambodia's post-conflict tourism industry, the portrait of Jayavarman VII has been stereotyped and reproduced in various materials of stone, clay, wood or bronze, mostly as a tourist souvenir, as it has become the "single most popular tourist souvenir marking a trip to Angkor". It has also more recently become an object of national pride for Cambodian households and venues. However, incidentally, the popularity of the portrait of Jayavarman VII has led a to a greater traffick in original and sometimes unidentified portraits of Jayavarman VII. Thus, in March 2000, a military squad captured suspected smugglers of antiquities who were believed to have looted 97 carvings and statues from this temple, including a Buddha figure, and an unspecified original bust of Jayavarman VII.

== Use: official logo of the Cambodian Ministry of Culture and Fine Arts ==
The bust of Jayavarman VII notably adorns the logo of the Ministry of Culture and Fine Arts. The original model used is not the bust of Ta Prohm but that of Kampong Svay.

== Bibliography ==
- Cœdès, George (1960). "Le portrait dans l'art khmer". Arts Asiatiques (in French). 7 (3): 179–198. ISSN 0004-3958. JSTOR 43485206.
- Cœdès, George (1958). "Les statues du roi khmèr Jayavarman VII". Comptes rendus des séances de l'Académie des Inscriptions et Belles-Lettres. 102 (3): 218–226. doi:10.3406/crai.1958.10910.
- Auboyer, Jeannine (1959). "Trois portraits du Roi Jayavarman VII". Arts Asiatiques. 6 (1): 70–74. ISSN 0004-3958. JSTOR 43471485.
- Pottier, Christophe (2000). "A propos de la statue portrait du roi Jayavarman VII au temple de Préah Khan de Kompong Svay". Arts Asiatiques (in French). 55 (1): 171–172. doi:10.3406/arasi.2000.1458. ISSN 0004-3958.
