= Arogayasala =

Cambodian temples

Arogayasala, or Arogyashala, are temple structures found in Cambodia and North-Eastern Thailand dating to the Khmer Empire. These Arogayasala served as medical facilities and are attributed to King Jayavarman VII whose reign lasted from c.1181 to c.1218.

== Etymology ==
Ārogyaśālā (आरोग्यशाला) is commonly written in English as Arogyasala or Arogyashala. It is a Sanskrit compound consisting of the terms ārogya (आरोग्य), meaning health and śālā (शाला), meaning house or enclosed space.

== Architecture and Construction ==
The Khmer hospitals appear across a great expanse of Jayavarman VII's territory and mostly near main settlements. Archaeological remains show that Arogayasala had a consistent structural composition. Inscriptional evidence from the Ta Prohm inscription (1186 CE) attests to 102 Arogayasala across Jayavarman VII's territory during his reign. Evidence found in the Surin Province determined that each Arogayasala contains both a medical facility and a Suttalaya (stone structure) enshrined with the Bhaiṣajya-guru-vaiḍūrya-prabhā, the medicinal Buddha. This religious aspect is also presented in architecturally standard forms, with three main images appearing on the main Prasat (temple); with Bhaisajayaguru-Vaidurya-Prabha in the centre and Surya-Vairocana and Candra-Vairocana on either side. Ritual worship in the temple aspect would have been conducted through offerings and sacrifices aligning with Buddhist traditions. Arogayasala remains also suggest that the hospitals had rectangular ponds with steps to their northeast. Given the importance of water to the Angkorian culture, these were likely filled with water and possibly involved in rituals. The hospital temples also possess pedestals with three holes, presumably to hold a Buddha and possibly Avalokitesvara and Prajnaparamita on the sides, both symbols of compassion, a central value in the Buddhist religion.

These temples are constructed out of laterite, an iron-rich rock found in warm, tropical regions. Laterite was a common building material in the later 12th century and 13th century, particularly in Jayavarman VII's early building regime. Arogayasala are identified by their architectural design, material composition and by their foundational stele. So far, less than half of the original 102 Arogayasala have been positively identified in remains today.

Prasat Andon Kuk is a late 12th-century example of these iconic Arogayasala in Jayavarman VII's capital of Koh Ker. This temple has provided evidence for the continued occupation of Koh Ker beyond the 10th century, an important historical discovery. Another example is the remains of Prang Ku in Chaiyaphum. The structure features a main Prang at its center, of about five meters in diameter with recessed corners. This is enclosed by a laterite wall outside of which resides a pond, like that described above. Its entrance includes an antechamber while three false doors guard the other sides of the structure. False doors were a typical architectural feature of the Khmer empire with their development visible in the Dieng Plateau temples of the early 7th century. Above one of these false doors on the north side is a lintel bearing the image of the Buddha sitting on the Kala in a classic meditative posture and holding garlands in each hand. Lintel design in the Khmer Empire followed observable trends and styles.

== History ==
The Arogayasala served dual purposes, providing both medical and religious services. They reflect an important and unique aspect of Jayavarman VII's reign; his focus on aiding and serving his people. These objectives reflect principles based on the Buddhist philosophy that was highly influential during the Angkorian period. In fact, during this time Jayavarman VII altered the ‘Hindu worldview’ from Deva-raja to Buddha-raja. The Deva-raja cult was established in the early 9th century by Jayavarman II and held its roots in Hindu traditions, with the king defined as the manifestation of the Hindu god, Śiva. Buddha-raja however, was a Buddhist cult to which Jayavarman VII dedicated several temples.

It would have taken an impressive investment to compile the labor and materials required to construct so many new structures across Jayavarman VII's vast territory. This effort correlates with the mass building efforts of Jayavarman VII's reign and the expansion and wealth of the Angkorian Empire at the time. The construction of Arogayasala appears to align with a reconfiguration of territory that came at the end of Jayavarman VII's reign. This rearrangement included changes to the very topography of the ancient landscape. For instance, some Arogayasala were positioned at certain corners of existing villages where, combined with other changes, they altered transportation routes.

== The Ta Prohm Stele Inscription ==
A key piece of evidence for the current understanding of Arogayasalas is the inscription of the Ta Prohm stele in Angkor, Cambodia, dated to 1186 CE. It is one of the larger inscriptions in Angkor and details the reign and works of King Jayavarman VII. Among these records are the constructional and operational details of Jayavarman VII's Arogayasala hospitals. The inscription attests to the scale and public support for these facilities, describing each of the 102 temples as having the complete support of both kings and the thousands of civilians inhabiting the many villages across the empire. The inscription also demonstrates Jayavarman VII's Buddhist ideologies towards his reign and subjects:

Filled with a deep sympathy for the good of the world, the king swore this oath: "All the beings who are plunged in the ocean of existence, may I draw them out by virtue of this good work. And may the kings of Cambodia who come after him me, attached to goodness...attain with their wives, dignitaries and friend, the places of deliverance, where there is no more illness."
