= Sri Jayarajacudamani =

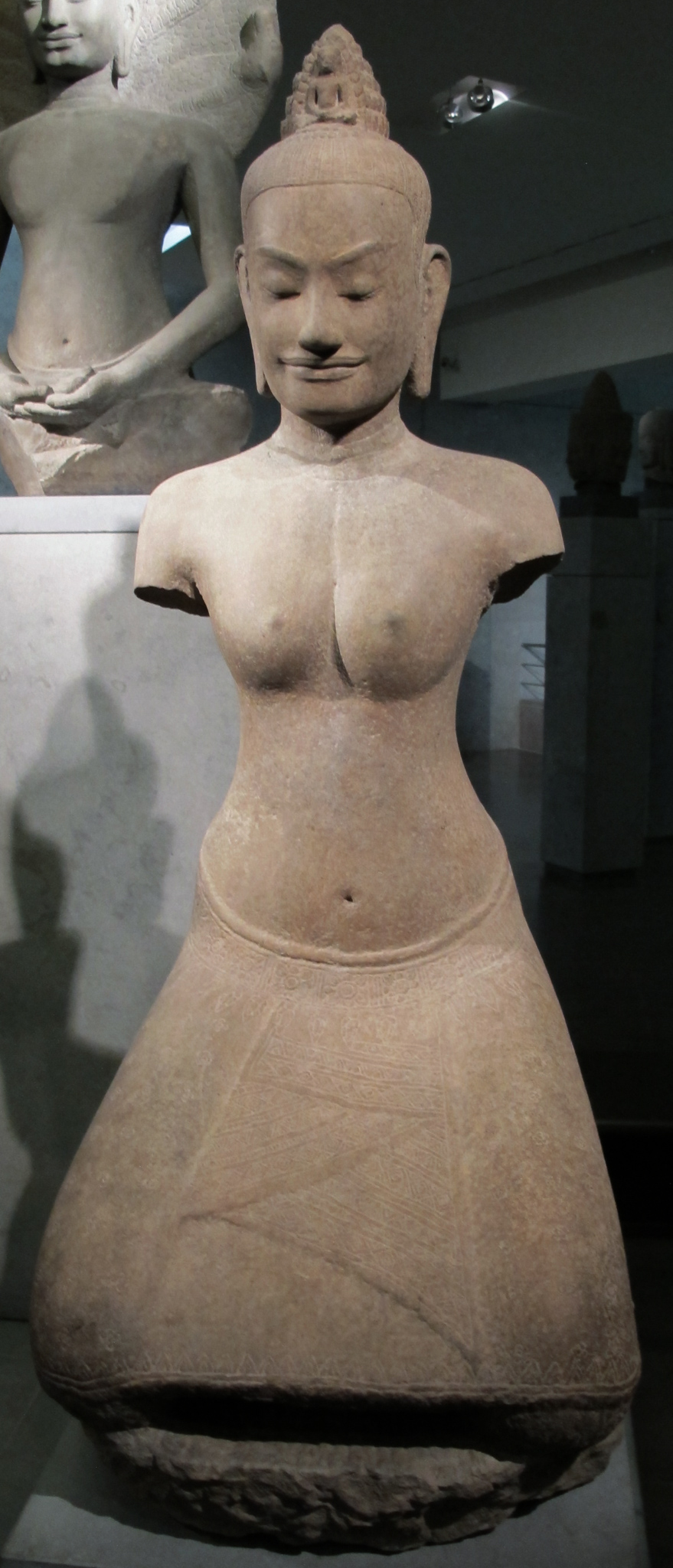
Presumed portrait of Sri Jayarajacudamani, in a representation of Prajnaparamita goddess, recognizable to the jina Amitabha in her coiffure, 12th century, Khmer Empire, Cambodia.

Sri Jayarajacudamani (12th-century), was a princess and queen consort of the Khmer Empire, married to Dharanindravarman II of the Khmer Empire (r. 1150–1160).

She was the daughter of Harshavarman III.

She married before 1125. She best known for being the mother of Jayavarman VII, who was born circa 1125.

Her spouse became king in 1150, and she became queen.

An inscription described Queen Jayarajadevi after her husband went into exile:

"[her] asceticism, her virtuous conduct, her tears, her likeness to Sita, found by her husband and then separated from him, her body thinned by observances, her religion, her devotion to him, her joy at this ultimate return."

Royal titles
| Preceded by queen ofSuryavarman II (Unidentified name) | List of Cambodia consorts | Succeeded by queen ofYasovarman II (Unidentified name) |
