= Indravarman II =

- King of the Khmers
- Reign: Khmer Empire
- Predecessor: Jayavarman VII
- Successor: Jayavarman VIII
- Died: 1243
Names
- Indrakumara
- Father: Jayavarman VII
- Mother: Jayarajadevi

Indravarman II (Khmer: ឥន្ទ្រវរ្ម័នទី២) was the ruler of the Khmer Empire, son of Jayavarman VII. There is some dispute regarding the actual period of his reign, even because his successor, Jayavarman VIII, probably destroyed historical records about him, but the only inscription which directly mention him reports that he died in 1243. He was a Buddhist and was also credited with having enlarged (or completed) some of Jayavarman VII's temple. During his peaceful kingdom, the Khmers lost control of Champa and the newborn Sukhothai Kingdom under Indraditya took possession of some western territories.

David P. Chandler hypothesized that Indravarman II was possibly the Leper King of Khmer legends.

Regnal titles
Preceded by Jayavarman VII	King of the Khmers c.1218–1243	Succeeded by Jayavarman VIII
