= Yasovarman II =

- King of Cambodia
- Reign: 1160–1167
- Predecessor: Dharanindravarman II
- Successor: Tribhuvanadityavarman
- Died: 1167

Yasovarman II (Khmer: យសោវរ្ម័នទី២) was the ruler of the Khmer Empire from 1160 to 1166. He succeeded Dharanindravarman II. In 1165, he was overthrown by the mandarin Tribhuvanadityavarman(ត្រីភូវនាទិត្យាវម្ម៌). His rule ended with his assassination by one of his subordinates.

== See also ==
- Banteay Chhmar
- Banteay Samré

Regnal titles
Preceded by Dharanindravarman II	Emperor of Angkor; 1160–1167	Succeeded by Tribhuvanadityavarman
