= Jayavarman VII =

Khmer king (c. 1122–1218)

Jayavarman VII the Great
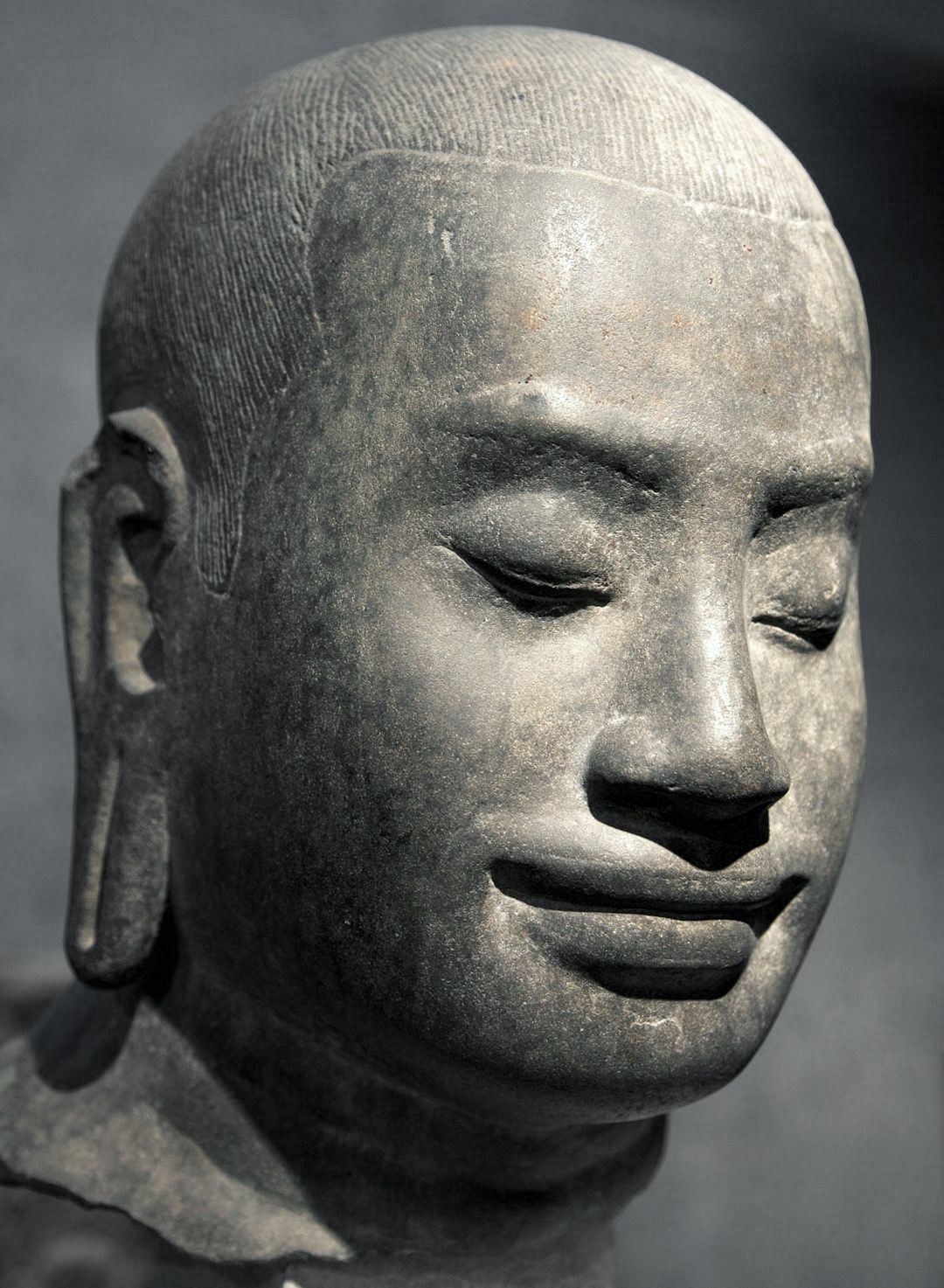
- Bust of Jayavarman VII, Guimet Museum

Emperor of the Khmer Empire
- Reign: 1181–1218
- Coronation: 1181
- Predecessor: Tribhuvanadityavarman (prior to the Cham Invasion)
- Successor: Indravarman II
- Born: c. 1122/1125; Angkor, Khmer Empire
- Died: 1218 (aged c. 95); Yaśodharapura (Angkor), Khmer Empire
- Consort: Jayarajadevi, Indradevi
- Issue: Suryakumara (mentioned in Ta Prohm); Virakumara (mentioned in Preah Khan); Srindrakumara (mentioned in Banteay Chhmar); Indravarman II; Tamalinda (later became a bhikku); Sukhara Mahadevi, chief consorts of Pho Khun Pha Mueang; Nripatindravarman III
Names
- Jayavarthon
- Dynasty: Varman
- Father: Dharanindravarman II
- Mother: Sri Jayarajacudamani
- Religion: Mahayana Buddhism

Military service
- Allegiance: Khmer Empire
- Battles/wars: Khmer–Cham wars

Jayavarman VII (Khmer: ព្រះបាទជ័យវរ្ម័នទី៧, lit. 'victory armor'), known posthumously as Mahaparamasaugata (1122–1218), was king of the Khmer Empire. He was the son of King Dharanindravarman II (r. 1150–1160) and Queen Sri Jayarajacudamani. He was the first Khmer king devoted to Buddhism; only one other had been a Buddhist. He built the Bayon as a monument to Buddhism. Historians generally consider Jayavarman VII the most powerful of the Khmer monarchs. His government built many projects, including hospitals, highways, rest houses, and temples. With Buddhism as his motivation, Jayavarman VII is credited with introducing a welfare state that served the Khmer people's physical and spiritual needs.

== Defeat of the Cham and coronation ==
In 1177, Champa King Jaya Indravarman IV launched the battle of Tonlé Sap on the Khmer capital by sailing a fleet up the Mekong River, across Lake Tonlé Sap, and up the Siem Reap River, a tributary of the Tonle Sap. The invaders pillaged the Khmer capital of Yasodharapura and put king Tribhuvanadityavarman to death. The Chams occupied Cambodia for the next four years.

Between 1177 and 1181, when he was in his mid-50s, Jayavarman came to historical prominence by leading a Khmer army to oust the Cham invaders, including a naval battle depicted on the walls of the Bayon and Banteay Chmar. Returning to the capital, he found it in disorder. He put an end to the disputes between warring factions and in 1181 was crowned king himself.

Early in his reign, he probably repelled another Cham attack and quelled a rebellion of the vassal Kingdom of Malyang (Battambang). He was greatly helped by the military skill of refugee Prince Sri Vidyanandana, who also played a part in the subsequent sacking and conquest of Champa (1190–1191). His conquest of Champa made it a dependency of the Khmer Empire for 30 years. Jayavarman expanded Khmer control of the Mekong Valley northward to Vientiane and southward down the Kra Isthmus.

== Public works and monuments ==
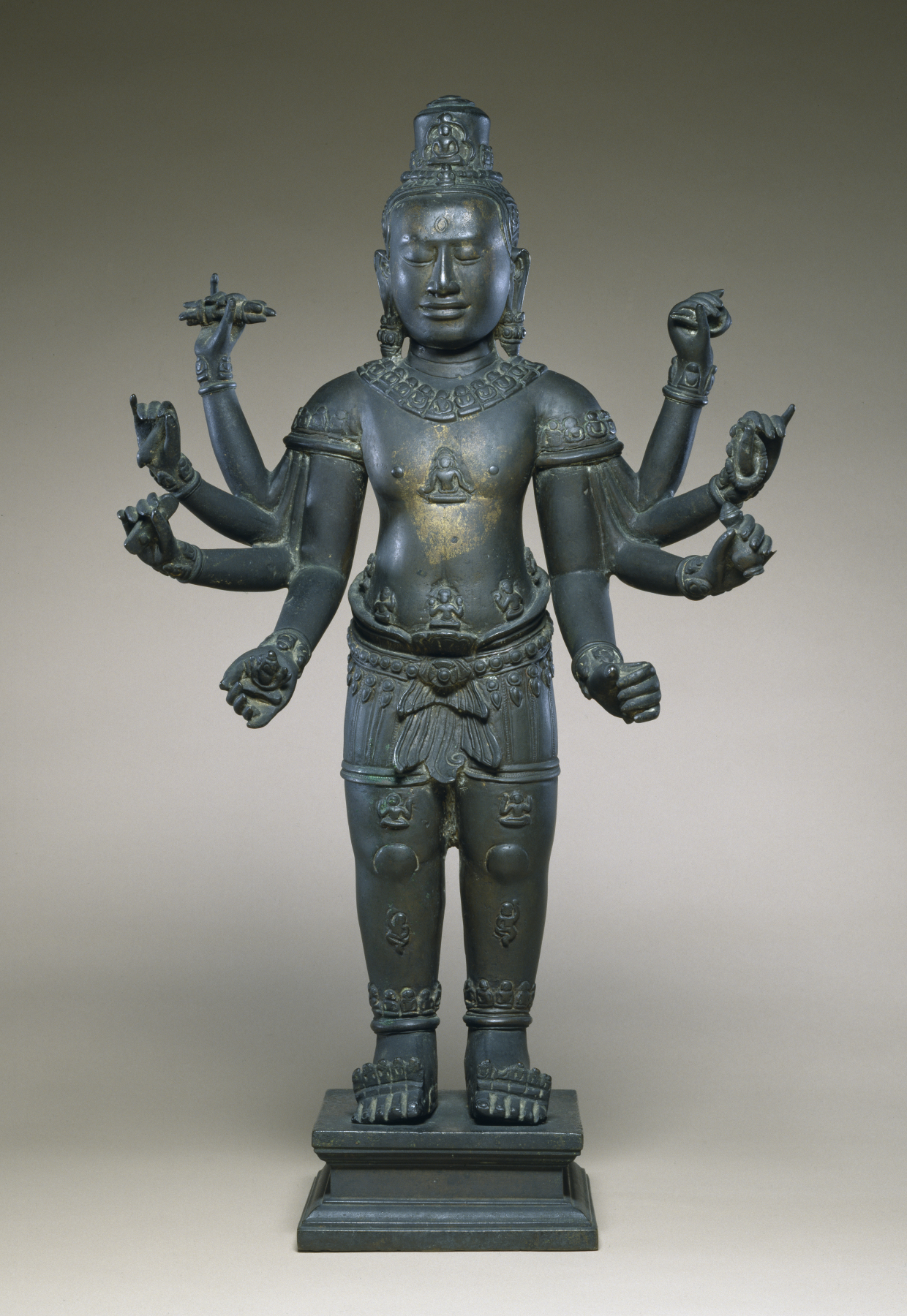
Bronze replica of one of the twenty-three stone images King Jayavarman VII sent to different parts of his kingdom in 1191. The Walters Art Museum.

Over the 37 years of his reign, Jayavarman embarked on a grand program of construction that included both public works and monuments. As a Mahayana Buddhist, his stated aim was to alleviate his people's suffering. One inscription tells us, "He suffered from the warts of his subjects more than from his own; the pain that affected men's bodies was for him a spiritual pain, and thus more piercing." This declaration must be read in light of the fact that the numerous monuments Jayavarman erected must have required the labor of thousands of workers, and that his reign was marked by the centralization of the state and the herding of people into ever greater population centers.

Historians have identified many facets of Jayavarman's intensive building program. In one phase, he focused on useful constructions, such as his famous 102 hospitals, rest houses along the roads, and reservoirs. Thereafter, he built a pair of temples in honor of his parents: Ta Prohm in honor of his mother and Preah Khan in honor of his father.

Finally, he constructed his own "temple-mountain" at Bayon and developed the city of Angkor Thom around it. He also built Neak Pean ("Coiled Serpent"), one of the smallest but most beautiful temples in the Angkor complex, a fountain with four surrounding ponds set on an island in the artificial lake.

The Preah Khan inscription says that the King erected Buddha stone images, the Jayabuddhamahanatha, in 23 towns in his empire. Among them were Lavo (modern Lopburi), Svarnapura, Sambukapattana, Srijayarajapuri (modern Ratchaburi), Srijayasimhapuri (modern Kanchanaburi), and Srijayavajrapuri (modern Phetburi).

=== Ta Prohm ===
In 1186, Jayavarman dedicated Ta Prohm ("Ancestor Brahma") to his mother. An inscription indicates that the temple at one time had 80,000 people assigned to its upkeep, including 18 high priests and 615 female dancers.

=== Angkor Thom and Bayon ===
Angkor Thom ("Grand Angkor" or "Angkor of Dham(ma)") was a new city centre, called in its day Indrapattha. At the centre of the new city stands one of Jayavarman's biggest achievements—the temple now called the Bayon, a multifaceted, multi-towered temple that mixes Buddhist and Hindu iconography. Its outer walls have bas reliefs of warfare and of the everyday life of the Khmer army and its followers. They show camp followers on the move with animals and oxcarts, hunters, women cooking, female traders selling to Chinese merchants, and celebrations of common foot soldiers. The reliefs also depict a naval battle on the great lake, the Tonle Sap.

=== Popular icon ===
Jayavarman VII's bust has been a favorite of Khmer households and a masterpiece of the National Museum for many years. The recent discovery of parts of the rest of his statue confirmed speculations about his spiritual aura as a sovereign.

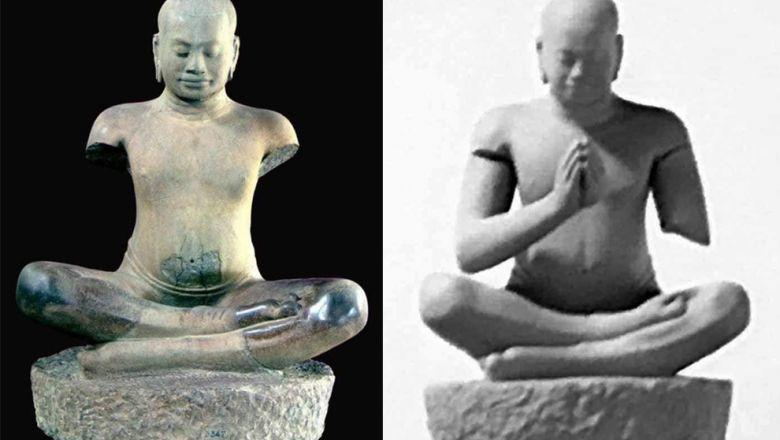

== Chronology ==
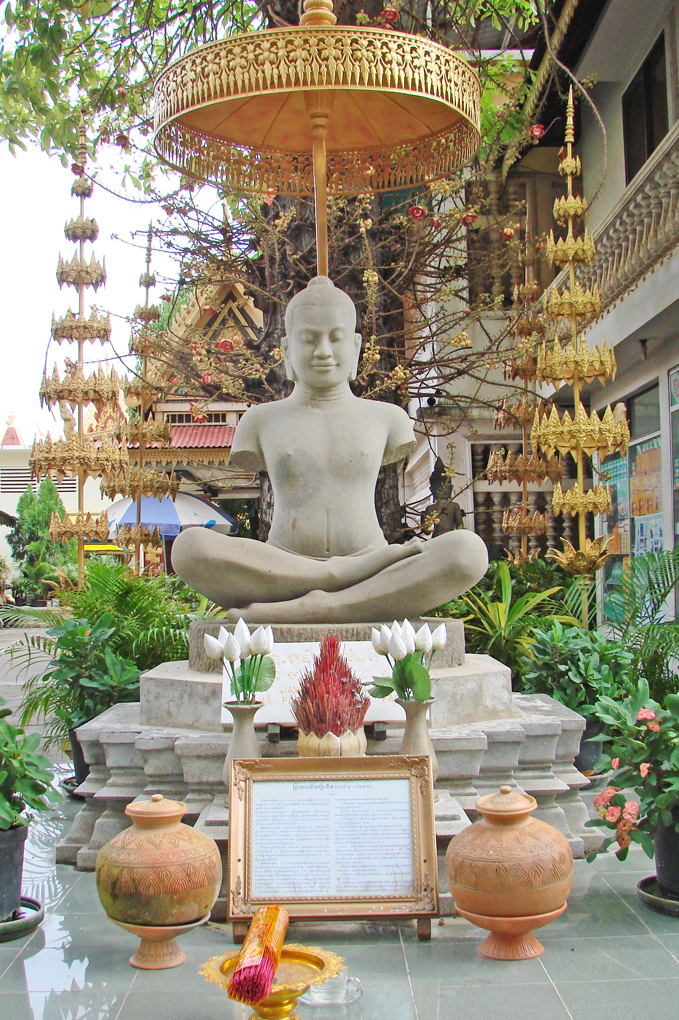
Jayavarman VII is commonly depicted with both his arms amputated.

King Suryavarman (Sun Shield) II, builder of Angkor Wat, died in 1150. He was succeeded by Dharanindravarman II, who ruled until 1160. Due to the absence of Jayavarman VII, Yashovarman II succeeded the throne, but was overthrown by Tribhuvanadityavarman (Protegee of the Sun of three worlds), assumed to be a usurper. In 1177, the Chams, led by Jaya Indravarman IV, invaded and Angkor was sacked. Nonetheless, this date, and the event itself, have been questioned by Michael Vickery, who doubts the reliability of the Chinese sources for this period. In 1181 Jayavarman VII became king after leading the Khmer forces against the Chams. In 1190, he took revenge on Champa for the 1177 raid.

Jayavarman died around 1218. He was succeeded by Indravarman II, who died by 1243. Indravarman was succeeded by Jayavarman VIII, a Shivaite. He embarked on the destruction or defacement of Jayavarman VII's Buddhist works. The niches along the top of the wall around the city contained images of the Buddha, and most were removed, as were the statue of Buddha at Bayon and the Buddha images in Angkor Thom, which were converted into linga.

== Legacy ==
The history of the Khmer empire cannot be read in the manner of European patterns of kingship, inheritance, or nationhood. A son of a Khmer king did not necessarily inherit the throne; Jayavarman VII had many sons, such as Suryakumara, Virakumara (the suffix "kumara" usually is translated as "prince"), and Srindrakumaraputra, the crown prince who died before his father, but only Indravarman II inherited the throne.

Jayavarman VII built 121 "houses with fire" rest houses every 15 kilometers along raised highways for travellers, and 102 hospitals. His was the "Buddhism of the Greater Vehicle". But Brahmans continued to play a "role at court", with Hrishikesa being made chief priest, with the title Jayamahapradhana.

Jayavarman married Princess Jayarajadevi. After her death, he married her sister Indradevi. The two women are commonly thought to have been a great inspiration to him, particularly in his strong devotion to Buddhism.

Though he had many sons, we know the names of only four, Suryakumara (mentioned in Ta Prohm), Virakumara (mentioned in Preah Khan), Srindrakumara (mentioned in Banteay Chhmar), and Tamalinda (who became a bhikku). He also fathered Sukhara Mahadevi, chief consorts of Pho Khun Pha Mueang, that appeared in Stele of Wat Sri choom Script of Sukhothai Historical Park.

== In popular culture ==
A fictionalised account of Jayavarman VII's life is the basis of one thread of Geoff Ryman's 2006 novel The King's Last Song.

Jayavarman VII is a playable character in the 4X video game Civilization VI, where he leads the Khmer civilization.

== See also ==
- Khmer–Cham wars
- History of Cambodia
- List of monarchs of Cambodia
- Terrace of the Leper King

Preceded by: Tribhuvanadityavarman	King of the Khmers; 1181–1218	Succeeded by: Indravarman II
