= Dharanindravarman II =

- King of the Khmer Empire
- Reign: 1150–1160
- Predecessor: Suryavarman II
- Successor: Yasovarman II
- Spouse: Sri Jayarajacudamani
- Issue: Jayavarman VII

Dharanindravarman II (Khmer: ធរណីន្ទ្រវរ្ម័នទី២; also titled Paramanishkalapada) was king of the Khmer Empire from 1150 to 1160.

He married the daughter of Harshavarman III, Princess Sri Jayarajacudamani. Their son Jayavarman VII was born by 1125.

Dharanindravarman II was a cousin of the king he succeeded, Suryavarman II.

The Yuhai encyclopedia records that in 1155 “Zhenla-Luohu” (that is, Cambodia) sent two elephants as tribute to the Song emperor.

== See also ==
- Early history of Cambodia
- Khmer Empire
- Preah Khan Kompong Svay

Regnal titles
Preceded by Suryavarman II	Emperor of Angkor; 1150–1160	Succeeded by Yasovarman II
