= Khmer Empire =

Empire in Southeast Asia (802–1431)

Kambuja កម្វុជ (Old Khmer)
- 802–1431 CE
- Khmer Empire, c. 900
- Capital: Mahendraparvata (early 9th century); Hariharalaya (mid 9th century); Yasodharapura (Note: Angkor) (late 9th cent.–928); Lingapura (Note: Koh Ker) (928–944); Yasodharapura (944–1431)
- Common languages: Old Khmer (common); Sanskrit (religious)
- Religion: Hinduism; Theravada Buddhism
- Government: Monarchy
- Monarch
  - 802–850 (first): Jayavarman II
  - 1113–1150: Suryavarman II
  - 1181–1218: Jayavarman VII
  - 1327–1336: Jayavarman IX
  - 1336–1340: Trasak Paem
  - 1373–1393: Thomma Saok
  - 1394–1431 (last): Ponhea Yat
- Historical era: Post-classical era
  - Indrapura founded: 781
  - Consecration of Jayavarman II: 802
  - Khmer–Cham wars: 950–1203
  - Construction of Angkor Wat: 1113–50
  - Conversion to Theravada Buddhism: 1295
  - Fall of Angkor: 1431

Area
- 1290: 1,000,000 km^{2} (390,000 sq mi)
- Currency: Moneyless barter (c.9th–12th centuries).; Chinese cash, hemp cloth, gold and silver (c.13th century).
Preceded by
Lower Chenla
Upper Chenla
Succeeded by
Post-Angkor Cambodia
Lan Xang
Ayutthaya
- Today part of: Cambodia; Laos; Thailand; Vietnam; Myanmar; China

The Khmer Empire, also known as the Angkorian Empire, was an empire in mainland Southeast Asia, centred on hydraulic cities in what is now northern Cambodia. Known as Kambuja (Old Khmer: កម្វុជ; Khmer: កម្ពុជ) by its inhabitants, it grew out of the former civilisation of Chenla and lasted from 802 to 1431 CE. Historians call this period of Cambodian history the Angkor period, after the empire's most well-known capital, Angkor. The Khmer Empire ruled or vassalised most of Mainland Southeast Asia and stretched as far north as southern China.

The beginning of the Khmer Empire is conventionally dated to 802 CE, when Khmer prince Jayavarman II declared himself chakravartin (lit. 'universal ruler', a title equivalent to 'emperor') in the Phnom Kulen mountains. Although the end of the Khmer Empire has traditionally been marked with the fall of Angkor to the Siamese Ayutthaya Kingdom in 1431 CE, the reasons for the empire's collapse are still debated amongst scholars. Researchers have determined that a period of strong monsoon rains was followed by a severe drought in the region, which caused damage to the empire's hydraulic infrastructure. Variability between droughts and flooding was also a problem, which may have caused residents to migrate southward and away from the empire's major cities.

The site of Angkor is perhaps the empire's most notable legacy, as it was the capital during the empire's zenith. The majestic monuments of Angkor, such as Angkor Wat and the Bayon, bear testimony to the Khmer Empire's immense power and wealth, impressive art and culture, architectural technique, aesthetic achievements, and variety of belief systems that it patronised over time. Satellite imaging has revealed that Angkor's elaborate water management network, during its peak in the 11th to the 13th centuries, was the most extensive pre-industrial urban complex in the world.

== Etymology ==
Modern scholars often refer to the Empire as the "Khmer Empire" (Khmer: ចក្រភពខ្មែរ) or the "Angkorian Empire" (Khmer: ចក្រភពអង្គរ), the latter after the capital Angkor. As the word Khmer is synonymous with the Khmer ethnicity, the majority ethnic group of Cambodia, the word Angkorian Empire is a less politically charged word than Khmer Empire. The Khmer Empire was not an ethno state and its kings did not think of the Empire in terms of racial identity and the Khmer Empire at its peak had dozens of minorities, including the Mon, Cham, and the Thai.

The Empire referred to itself as Kambuja (Sanskrit: កម្ពុជ; Old Khmer: កម្វុជ; Khmer: កម្ពុជ) or Kambujadeśa (Sanskrit: កម្ពុជទេស, lit. 'the country of the sons of Kambu'; Old Khmer: កម្វុជទេឝ; Khmer: កម្ពុជទេស), names which were pre-modern predecessors to the modern Kampuchea.

== Historiography ==
No written records of the Angkor period have survived other than stone inscriptions. Current knowledge of the historical Khmer civilisation is derived primarily from:

- Archaeological excavation, reconstruction and investigation
- Stone inscriptions (the most important of which are foundation steles of temples), which report on the political and religious deeds of the kings
- Reliefs in a series of temple walls with depictions of daily life, market scenes, military marches, and palace life
- Reports and chronicles of Chinese diplomats, traders, and travellers

== History ==
=== Formation and growth ===
==== Reign of Jayavarman II ====
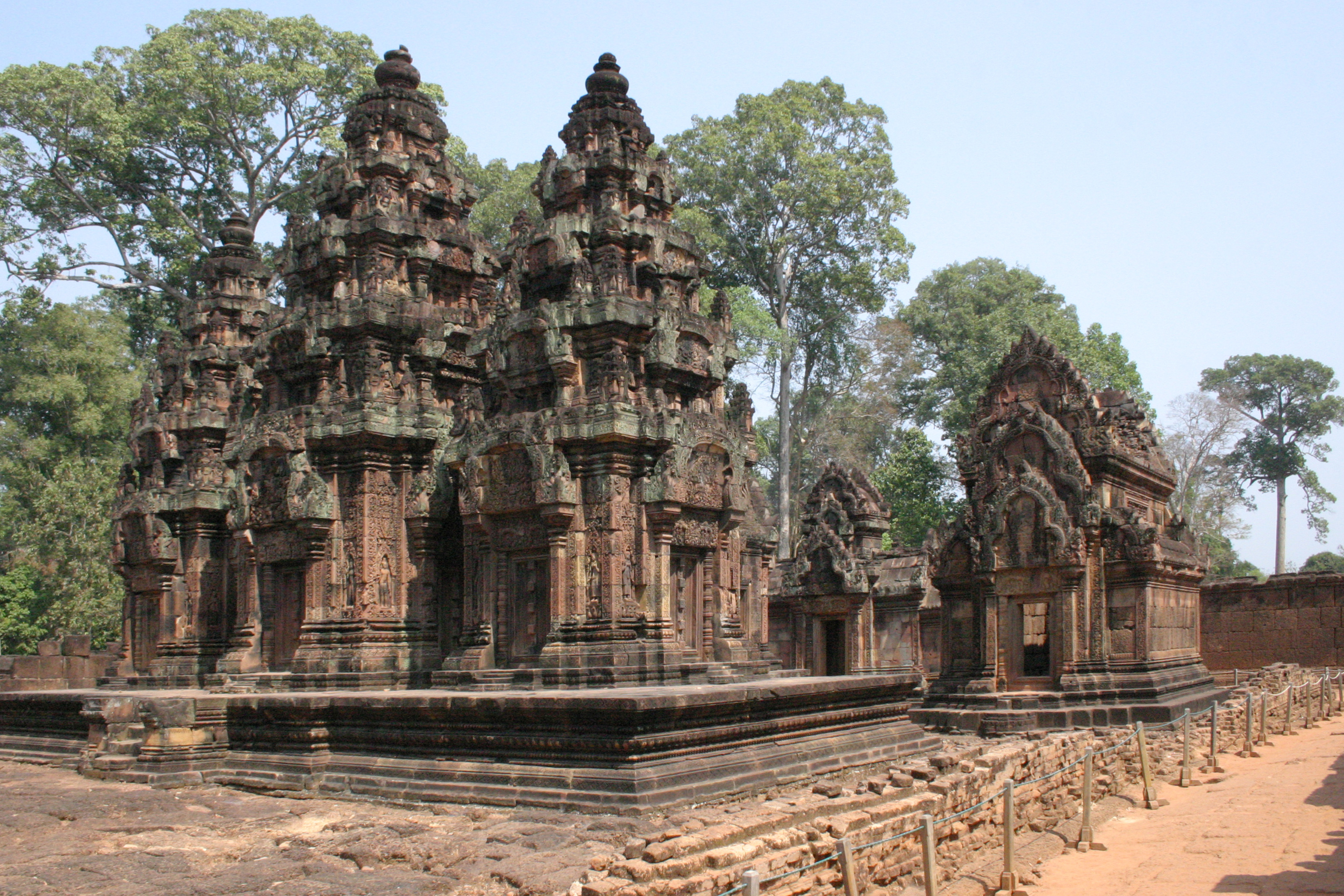
Temple of Banteay Srei, built 967 AD

According to an Sdok Kok Thom temple inscription, around 781 the Khmer prince Jayavarman II established Indrapura as the capital of his domain. It was located in Banteay Prey Nokor, near today's Kampong Cham. After returning to his home in the former kingdom of Chenla, he quickly built up his influence and defeated a series of competing kings. In 790 he became king of an empire called Kambuja by the Khmer. He then moved his court northwest to Mahendraparvata, far inland north from the great lake of Tonlé Sap.

Jayavarman II (reigned 802–835) is widely regarded as the king who set the foundations of the Angkor period. According to the Baksei Chamkrong inscription, dated to 947, he was born in the lineage of Rudravarman. Historians generally agree that this period of Cambodian history began in 802, when Jayavarman II conducted a grandiose consecration ritual on the sacred Mount Mahendraparvata, now known as Phnom Kulen. At the ritual, which was taken from the Hindu tradition, Jayavarman II proclaimed himself as chakravartin (from Sanskrit, commonly translated as "universal ruler"; Old Khmer: Kamraten jagad ta Raja) and devaraja (from Sanskrit, lit. 'god king'). He also declared Kambuja's independence from a place inscriptions call "Java".

Historians debate whether "Java" means the Indonesian island of Java, Champa or a different location. According to an older established interpretation, Jayavarman II was a prince who lived at the court of Sailendra in Java and brought back to Cambodia the art and culture of the Javanese Sailendran court (such as the concept of a devaraja). This classical theory was criticised by modern scholars such as Claude Jacques and Michael Vickery, who noted that the Khmer used the term chvea to describe the Chams, their neighbours to the east. But in 2013 Arlo Griffiths refuted these theories and convincingly demonstrated that in almost all cases the inscriptions mention Java they refer to the island of Java in the Indonesian archipelago.

Jayavarman's political career began in Vyadhapura (likely the modern-day ruins of Banteay Prey Nokor) in eastern Cambodia. Moreover, many early temples on Phnom Kulen show Cham (e.g. Prasat Damrei Krap) as well as Javanese influences (e.g. the primitive "temple-mountain" of Aram Rong Cen and Prasat Thmar Dap), even if their asymmetric distribution seems typically Khmer.

In the following years, Jayavarman II extended his territory and established a new capital, Hariharalaya, near the modern-day town of Roluos. He thereby laid the foundation of Angkor, which was to arise some 15 kilometres (9.3 mi) to the northwest. Jayavarman II died in 835 and was succeeded by his son Jayavarman III. Jayavarman III died in 877 and was succeeded by Indravarman I.

The successors of Jayavarman II kept extending the territory of Kambuja. Indravarman I (reigned 877–889) managed to expand the kingdom without wars and initiated extensive building projects, which were enabled by the wealth gained through trade and agriculture. Foremost were the temple of Preah Ko and irrigation works. Indravarman I developed Hariharalaya further by constructing Bakong circa 881. Bakong in particular bears striking similarities to the Borobudur temple in Java, which suggests that it may have served as the prototype for Bakong. There were at the time exchanges of travellers and missions between Kambuja and the Sailendras in Java, which brought to Cambodia not only ideas, but also technical and architectural details.

==== Establishment of Yasodharapura ====
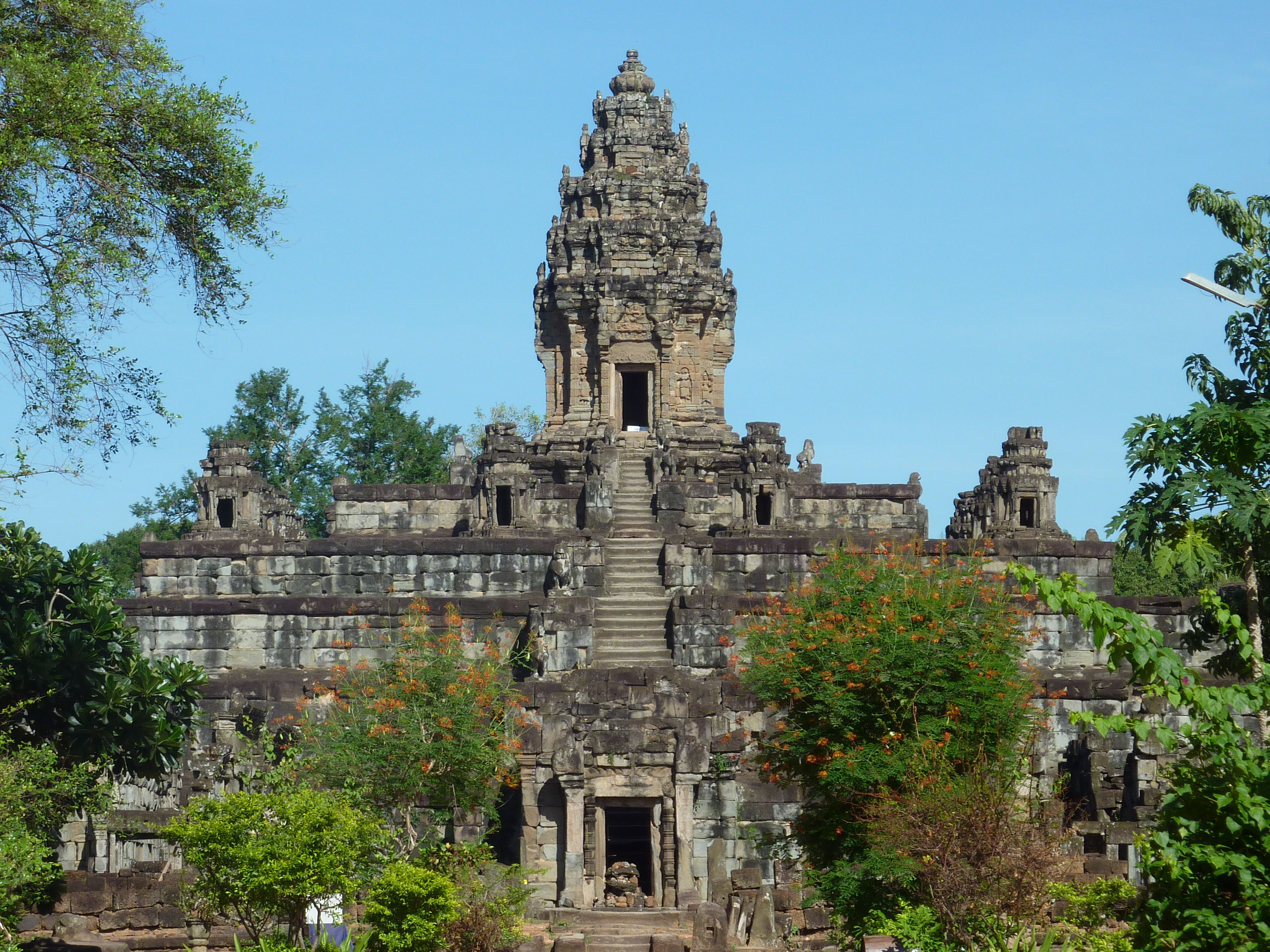
Bakong, one of the earliest temple mountains in Khmer architecture

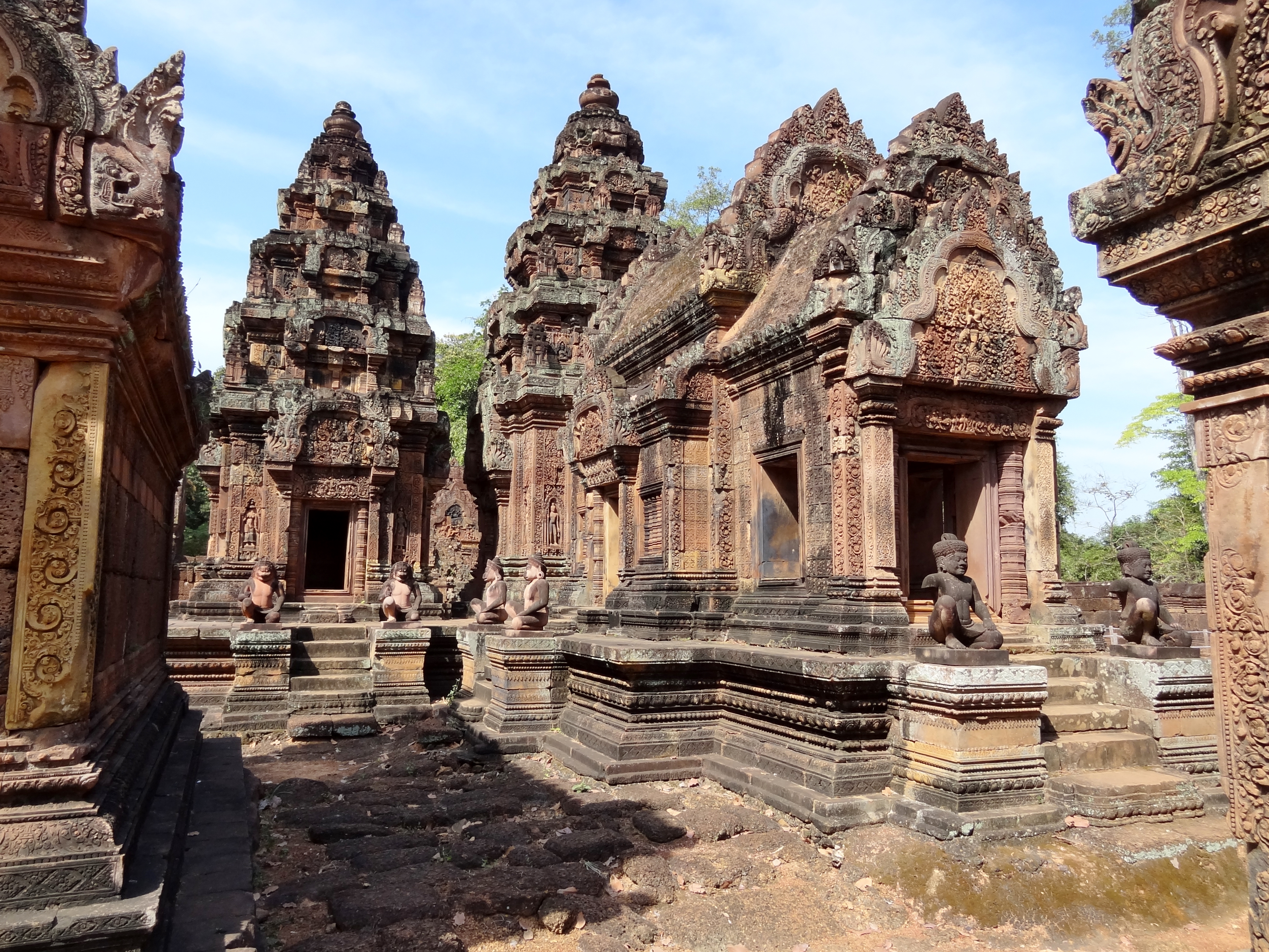
Banteay Srei, a 10th-century Cambodian temple dedicated to the Hindu god Shiva

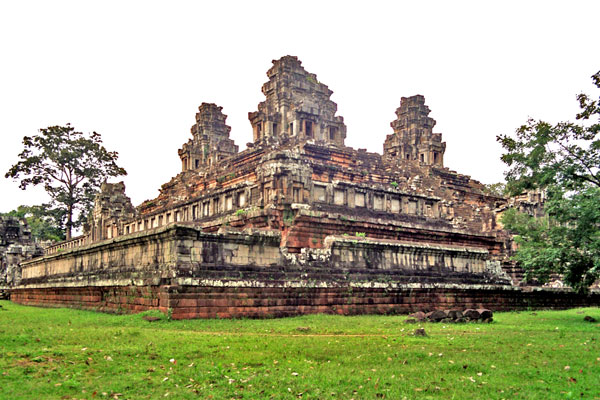
Ta Keo, a state temple built around the year 1000

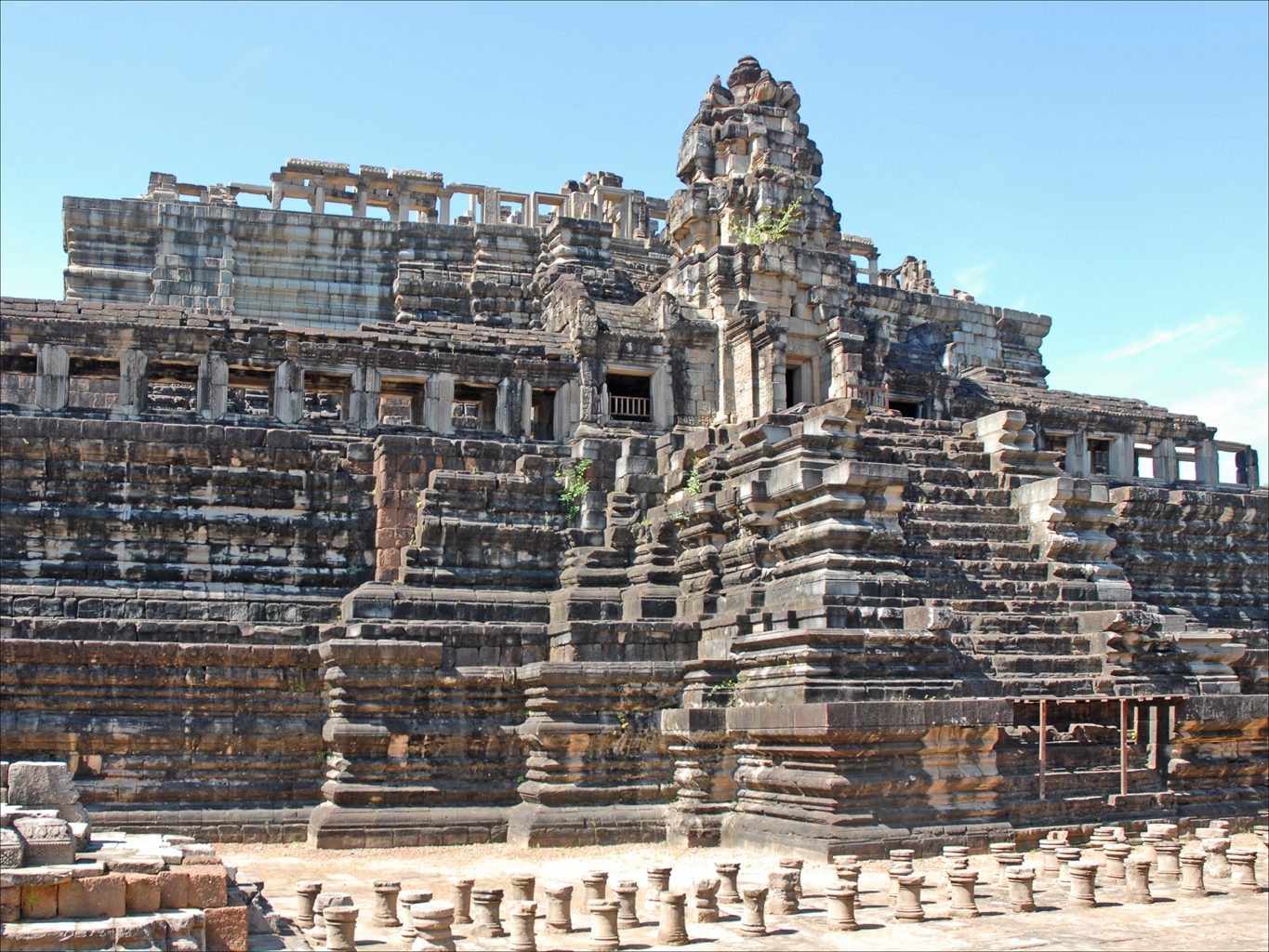
Baphuon, a temple-mountain dedicated to Shiva

Indravarman I was followed by his son Yasovarman I (reigned 889–915), who established a new capital, Yasodharapura – the first city of the larger Angkor area. The city's central temple was built on Phnom Bakheng, a hill which rises around 60 m above the plain on which Angkor sits. The East Baray, a massive water reservoir measuring 7.1 by 1.7 kilometres (4.4 by 1.1 mi), was also created under the reign of Yasovarman I.

At the beginning of the 10th century, the empire fractured. Jayavarman IV moved the capital to Lingapura (now known as Koh Ker), some 100 kilometres (62 mi) northeast of Angkor. Only when Rajendravarman II ascended to the throne (reigned 944–968) was the royal palace returned to Yasodharapura. He once again took up the extensive building schemes of the earlier kings and established a series of Hindu temples in the Angkor area, such as Pre Rup and the East Mebon, a temple located on an artificial island in the centre of the East Baray. Several Buddhist temples and monasteries were also built. In 950, the first war took place between Kambuja and the kingdom of Champa to the east (in what is now central Vietnam).

The son of Rajendravarman II, Jayavarman V, reigned from 968 to 1001, after establishing himself as the new king over the other princes. His rule was a largely peaceful period, marked by prosperity and a cultural flowering. He established a new capital slightly west of his father's and named it Jayendranagari; its state temple, Ta Keo, was to the south. At the court of Jayavarman V lived philosophers, scholars, and artists. New temples were also established; the most important of these were Banteay Srei, considered one of the most beautiful and artistic of Angkor, and Ta Keo, the first temple of Angkor built completely of sandstone.

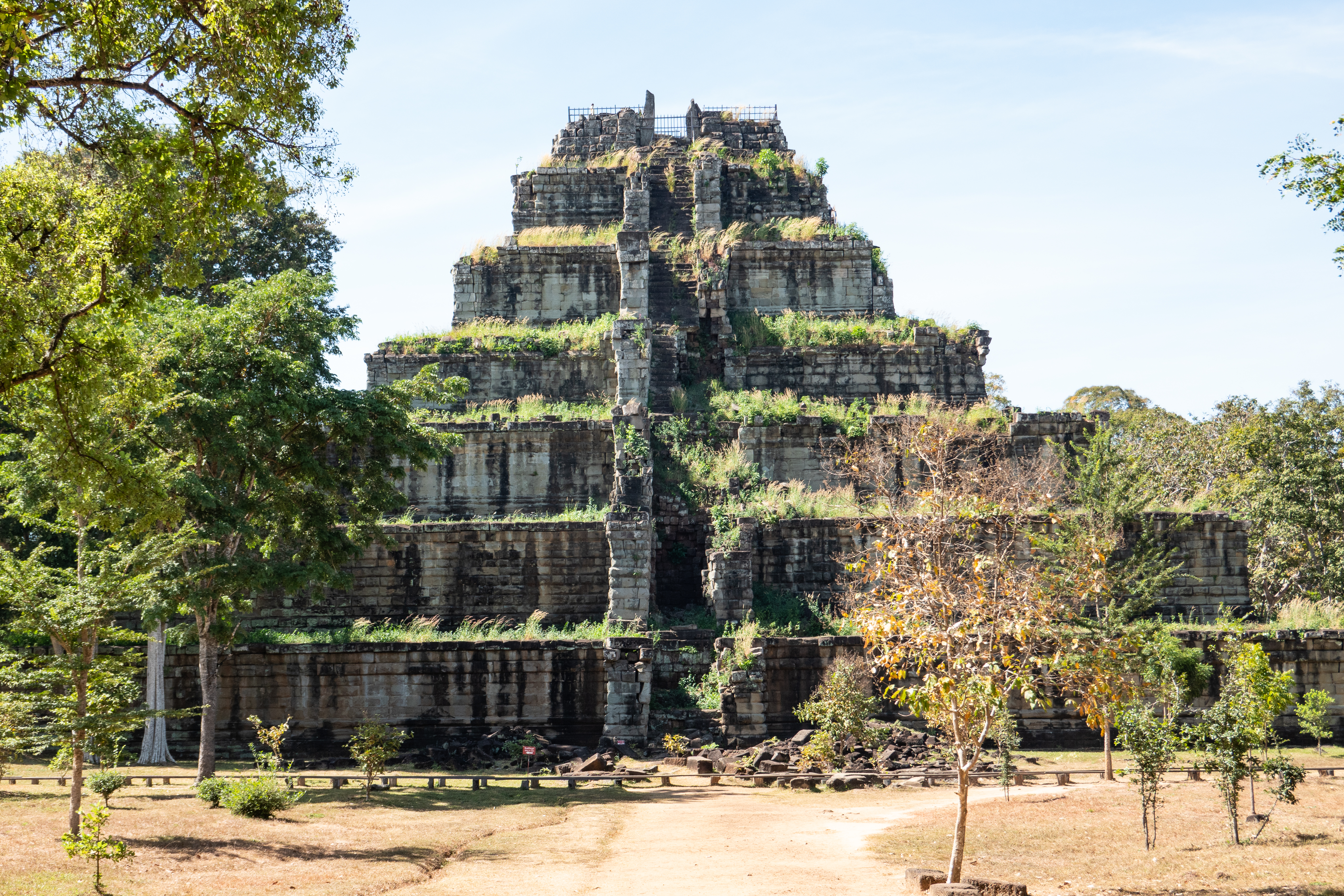
The pyramid of Koh Ker. Koh Ker (Lingapura) was briefly the capital of Kambuja.

A decade of conflict followed the death of Jayavarman V. Three kings reigned simultaneously as antagonists to each other until Suryavarman I (reigned 1006–1050) ascended to the throne by taking the capital Angkor. His rule was marked by repeated attempts by his opponents to overthrow him and military conflicts with neighbouring kingdoms. Suryavarman I established diplomatic relations with the Chola dynasty of south India early in his rule.

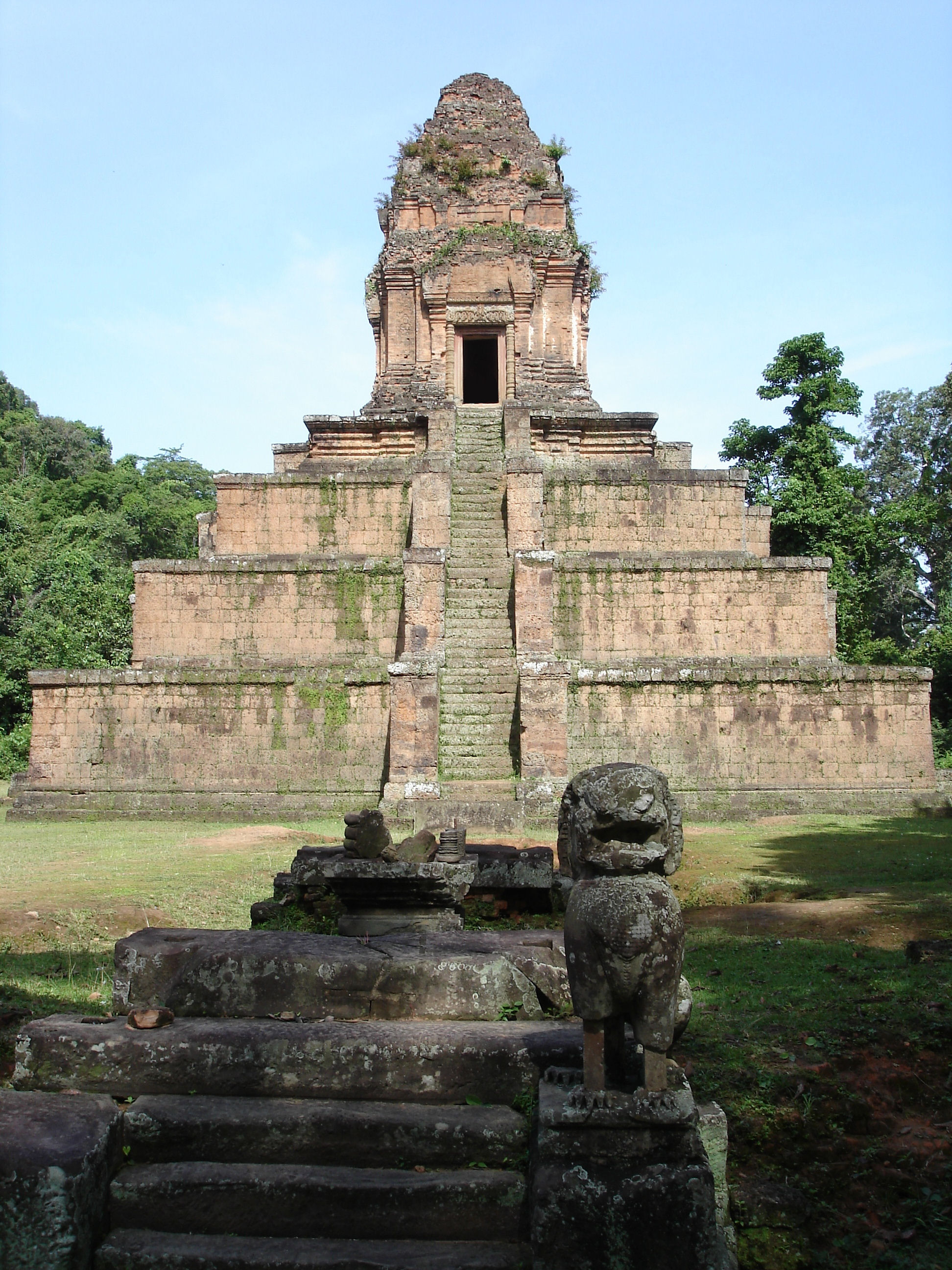
Pyramid of Prasat Baksei Chamkrong

In the first decade of the 11th century, Kambuja came into conflict with the kingdom of Tambralinga in the Malay Peninsula. After surviving several invasions from his enemies, Suryavarman requested aid from the powerful Chola emperor Rajendra I against Tambralinga. After learning of Suryavarman's alliance with Chola, Tambralinga requested aid from the Srivijaya king Sangrama Vijayatungavarman. This eventually led to Chola coming into conflict with Srivijaya. The war ended with a victory for Chola and Kambuja, and major losses for Srivijaya and Tambralinga. The two alliances had religious nuance, as Chola and Kambuja were Hindu Shaivite, while Tambralinga and Srivijaya were Mahayana Buddhist. There is some indication that, before or after the war, Suryavarman I gifted a chariot to Rajendra I to possibly facilitate trade or an alliance.

Suryavarman I's wife was Viralakshmi, and following his death in 1050, he was succeeded by Udayadityavarman II, who built the Baphuon and West Baray. In 1074, conflict arose between Harshavarman III, the younger brother and successor of Udayadityavarman II, and the Champa king Harivarman IV.

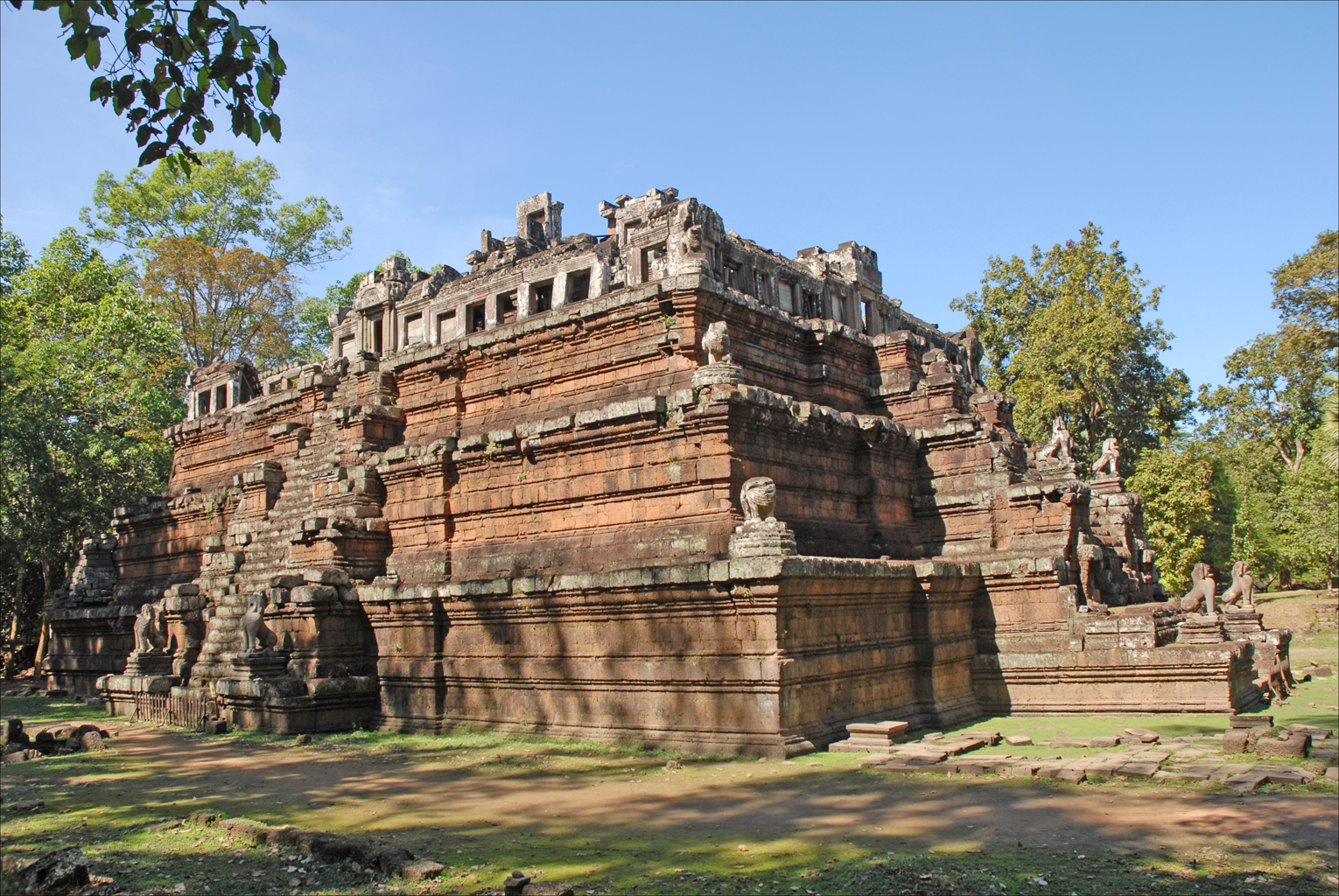
Stepped pyramid of Phimeanakas

=== Golden age of Khmer civilisation ===
The Greater Angkor Region had a population of approximately 700,000 to 900,000 at its peak in the 13th century CE. This population made Angkor one of the most populous cities of the medieval world.

==== Reign of Suryavarman II and Angkor Wat ====
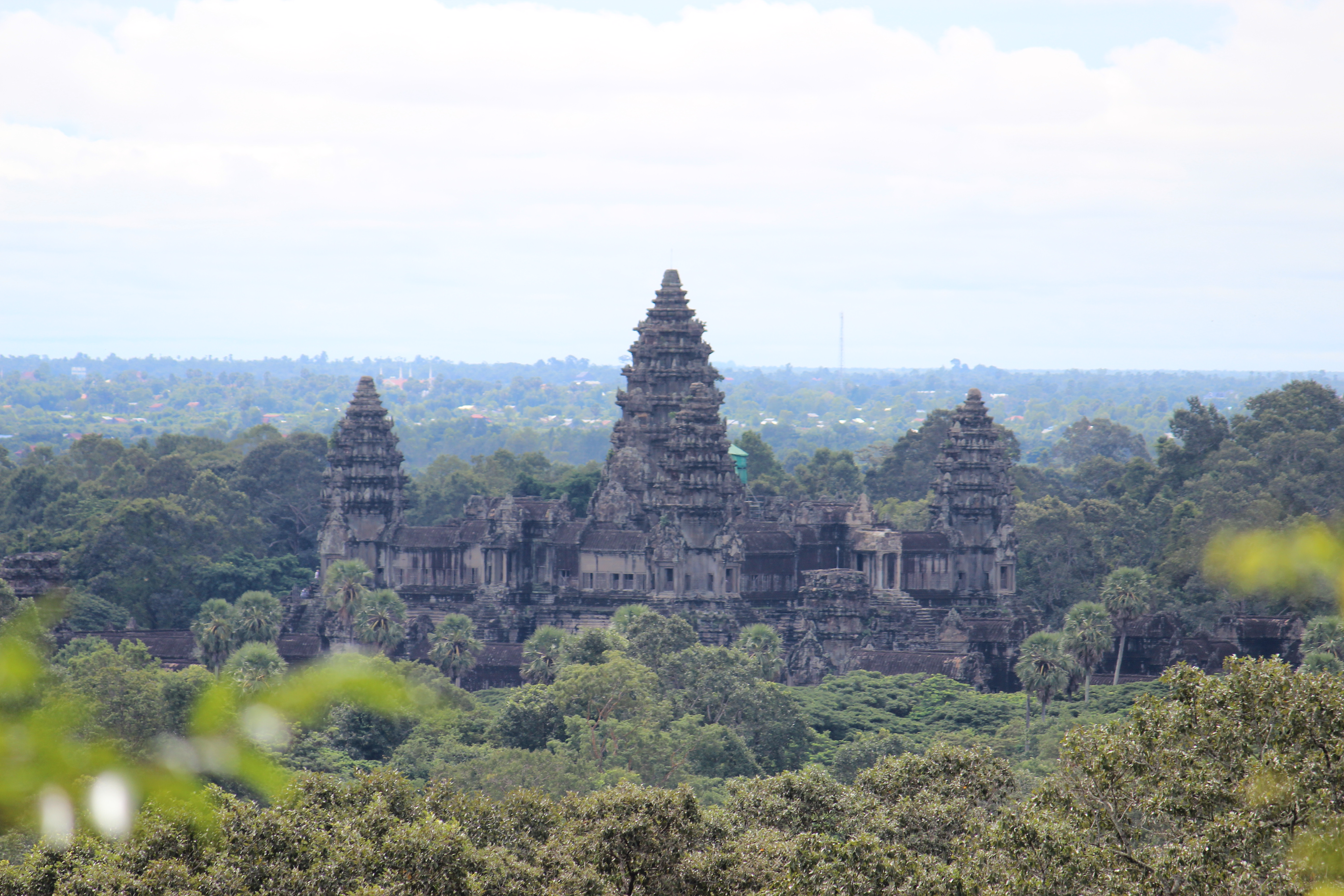
Angkor Wat

The 12th century was a time of conflict and brutal power struggles. Under Suryavarman II (reigned 1113–1150) the empire united internally and Angkor Wat, dedicated to the god Vishnu, was built over a period of 37 years. In the east, Suryavarman II's campaigns against Champa and Dai Viet were unsuccessful, though he sacked Vijaya in 1145 and deposed Jaya Indravarman III. The Khmers occupied Vijaya until 1149, when they were driven out by Jaya Harivarman I. In 1114, Suryavarman II sent a mission to Chola and presented a precious stone to the Chola emperor Kulottunga I.

Another period followed in which kings reigned briefly and were violently overthrown by their successors. Finally, in 1177 the capital was raided and looted in a naval battle on the Tonlé Sap lake by a Cham fleet under Jaya Indravarman IV, and Khmer king Tribhuvanadityavarman was killed.

==== Reign of Jayavarman VII and Angkor Thom ====
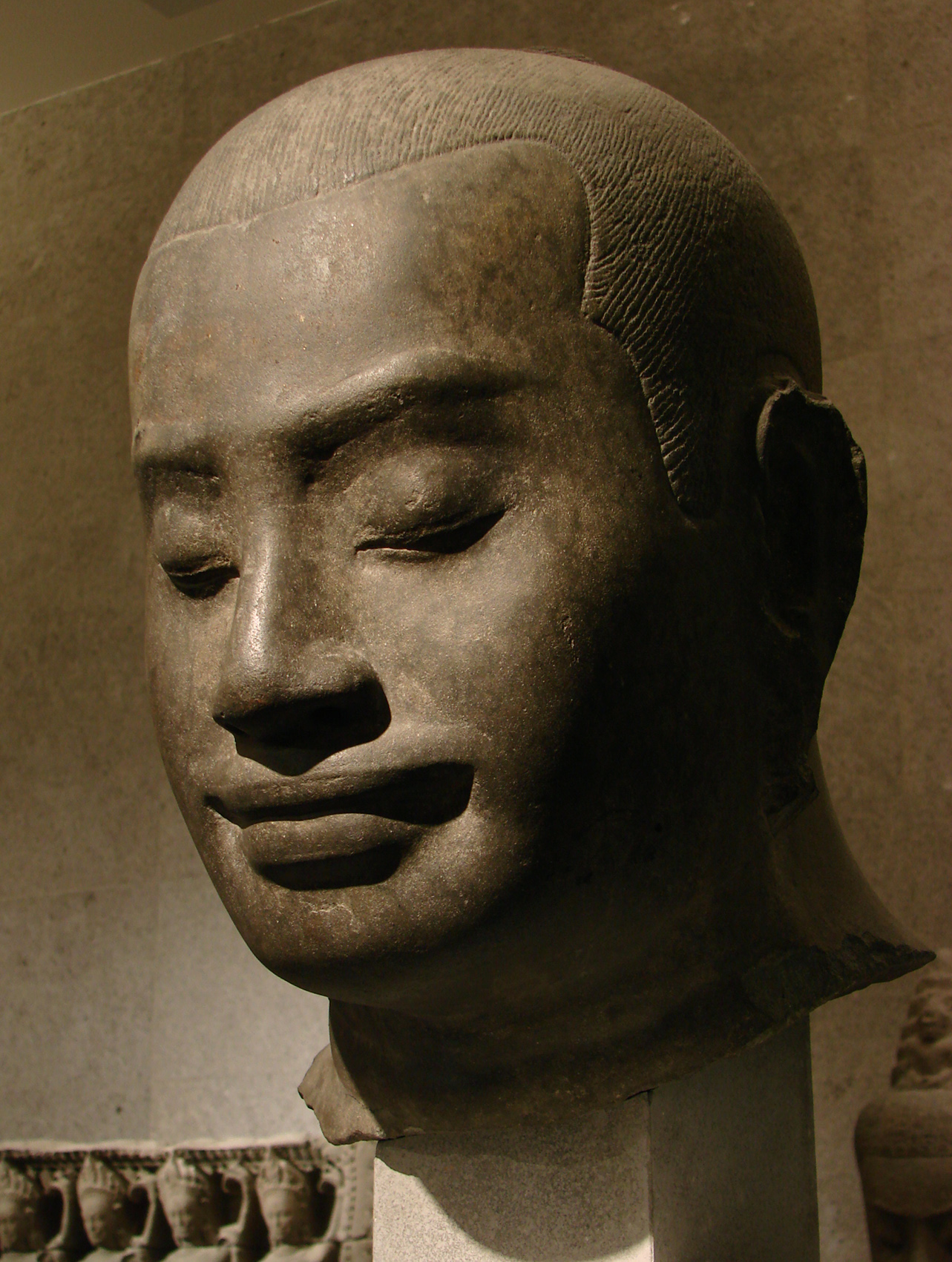
Portrait statue of Jayavarman VII

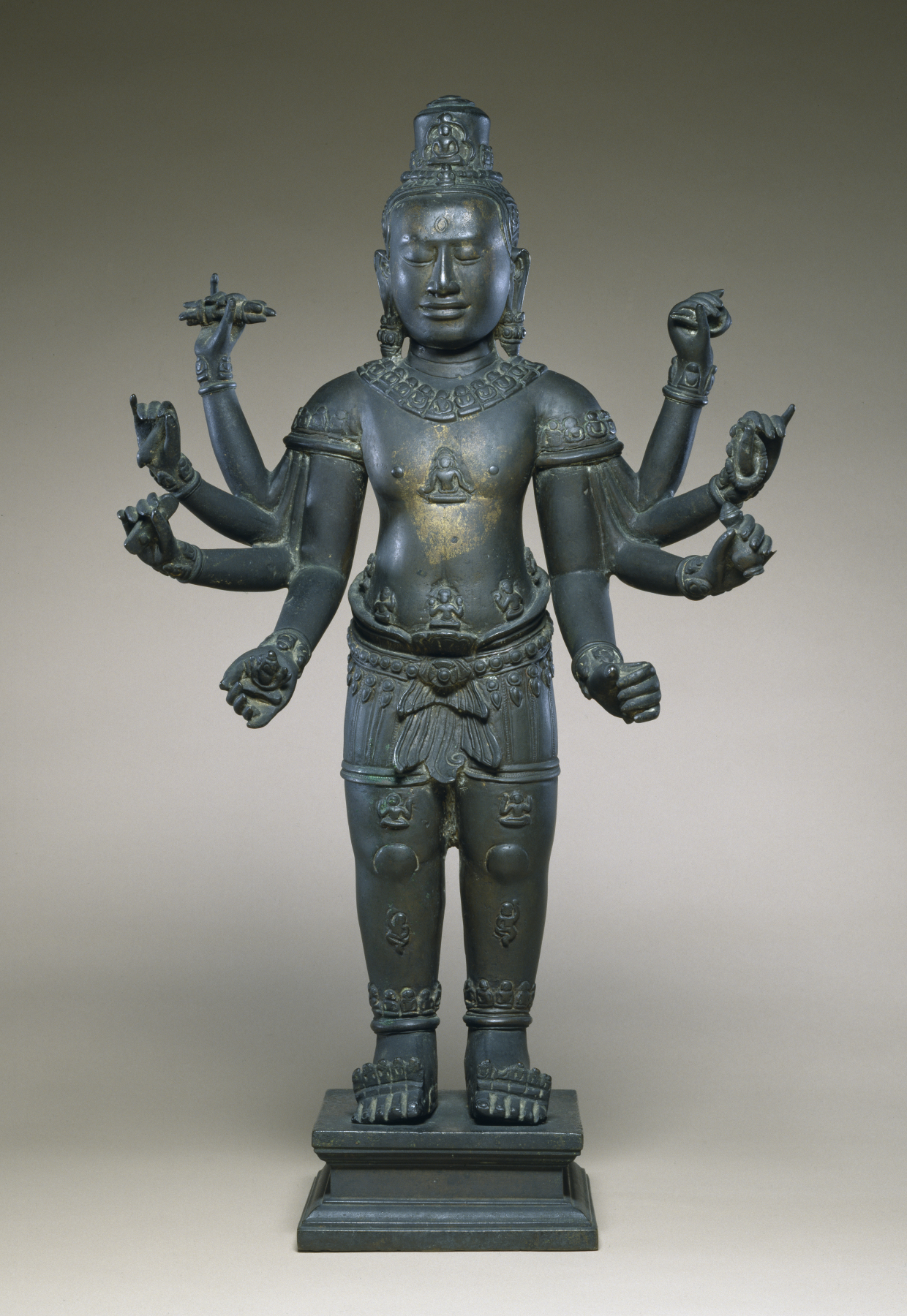
Bronze replica of one of the twenty-three stone images sent by King Jayavarman VII to different parts of his kingdom in 1191

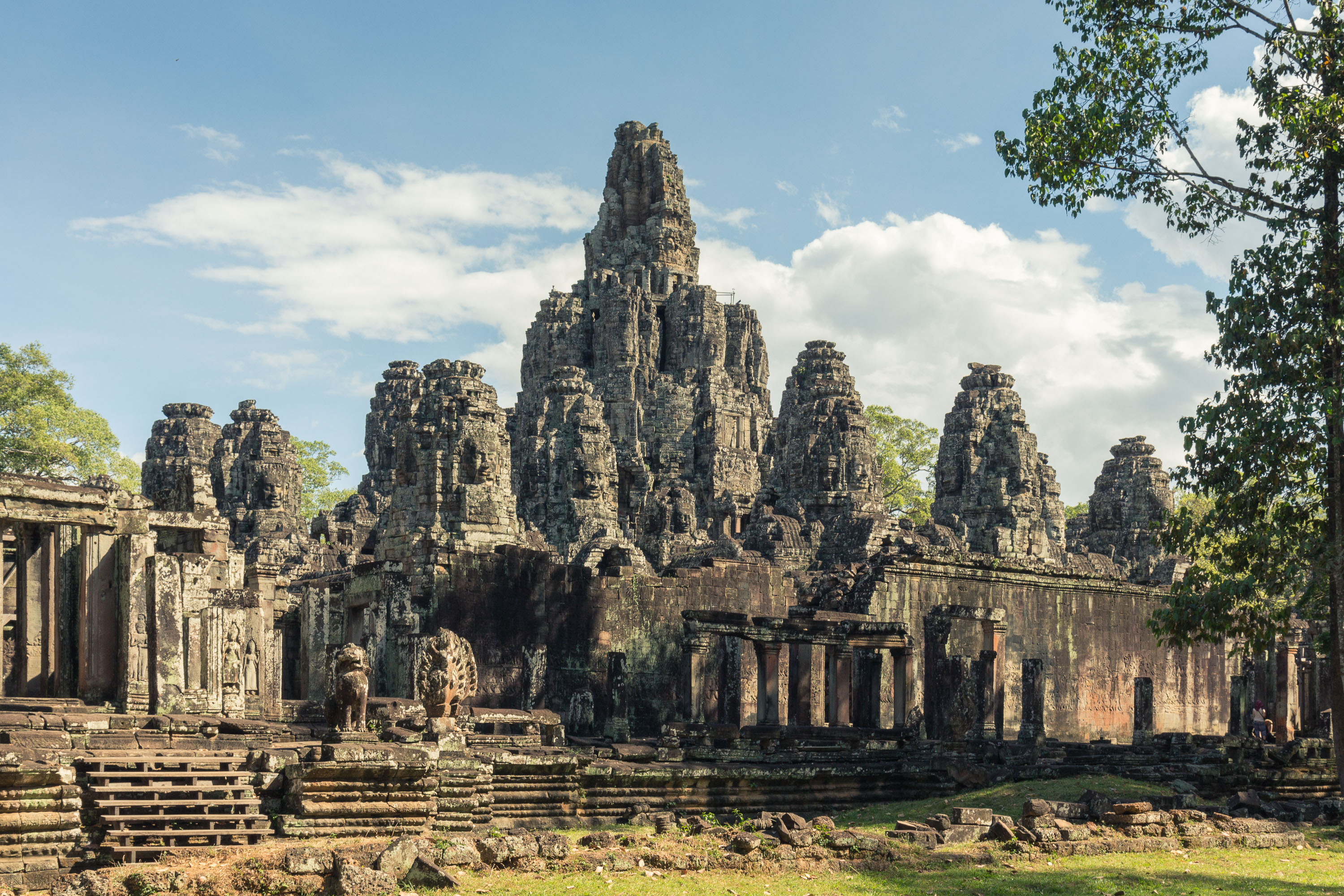
The Bayon, the state temple located at the centre of Jayavarman VII's capital, Angkor Thom

King Jayavarman VII (reigned 1181–1219) was generally considered Cambodia's greatest king. He had already been a military leader as a prince under the previous kings. After Champa had conquered Angkor, he gathered an army and retook the capital. He consequently ascended to the throne and continued to wage war against Champa for another 22 years, until the Khmer defeated the Chams in 1203 and conquered large parts of their territory. According to Chinese sources, Jayavarman VII added Pegu to the territory of the Khmer Empire in 1195.

Jayavarman VII stands as the last of the great kings of Angkor, not only because of his successful military campaign against Champa, but also because he was not a tyrannical ruler in the manner of his immediate predecessors. He unified the empire and carried out noteworthy building projects. The new capital, now called Angkor Thom (lit. 'great city'), was built. In the centre, the king (himself a follower of Mahayana Buddhism) had constructed as the state temple the Bayon, with towers bearing faces of the boddhisattva Avalokiteshvara, each several metres high, carved out of stone. Further important temples built under Jayavarman VII were Ta Prohm for his mother, Preah Khan for his father, Banteay Kdei, and Neak Pean, as well as the reservoir of Srah Srang. An extensive network of roads was laid down connecting every town of the empire, with rest-houses built for travellers and a total of 102 hospitals established across his realm.

==== Reign of Jayavarman VIII ====
The Khmer Empire and contemporary Asian polities circa 1300

After the death of Jayavarman VII, his son Indravarman II (reigned 1219–1243) ascended to the throne. Like his father, he was a Buddhist, and he completed a series of temples begun under his father's rule. As a warrior he was less successful. In 1220, under mounting pressure from the increasingly powerful Đại Việt and its ally Champa, the Khmer withdrew from many of the provinces previously conquered from the Chams.

Indravarman II was succeeded by Jayavarman VIII (reigned 1243–1295). In contrast to his predecessors, Jayavarman VIII was a follower of Hindu Shaivism and an aggressive opponent of Buddhism, destroying many Buddha statues in the empire and converting Buddhist temples to Hindu temples. Kambuja was threatened externally in 1283 by the Mongol-led Yuan dynasty. Jayavarman VIII avoided war with general Sogetu (sometimes known as Sagatu or Sodu), the governor of Guangzhou, China, by paying annual tribute to the Mongols, starting in 1285. Jayavarman VIII's rule ended in 1295 when he was deposed by his son-in-law Srindravarman (reigned 1295–1309). The new king was a follower of Theravada Buddhism, a school of Buddhism that had arrived in Southeast Asia from Sri Lanka and subsequently spread through most of the region.

In August 1296, the Chinese diplomat Zhou Daguan arrived in Angkor and recorded, "In the recent war with the Siamese, the country was utterly devastated". He remained at the court of Srindravarman until July 1297. He was neither the first nor the last Chinese representative to visit Kambuja. His stay is notable, however, because Zhou later wrote a detailed report on life in Angkor. His portrayal of the empire is today one of the most important sources of understanding historical Angkor. Alongside the descriptions within several great temples (the Bayon, the Baphuon, Angkor Wat), his account informs us that the towers of the Bayon were once covered in gold; the text also offers valuable information on the everyday life and habits of the inhabitants of Angkor.

=== Decline ===
By the 14th century, Kambuja had suffered a long, arduous, and steady decline. Historians have proposed different causes for the decline: the religious conversion from Vishnuite-Shivaite Hinduism to Theravada Buddhism that affected social and political systems, incessant internal power struggles among Khmer princes, vassal revolt, foreign invasion, plague, and ecological breakdown.

For social and religious reasons, many aspects contributed to the decline of Kambuja. The relationship between the rulers and their elites was unstable – among the 27 rulers of Kambuja, eleven lacked a legitimate claim to power, and violent power struggles were frequent. Kambuja focused more on its domestic economy and did not take advantage of the international maritime trade network. The input of Buddhist ideas also conflicted with and disturbed the state order built under Hinduism.

==== Conversion from Hinduism to Buddhism ====
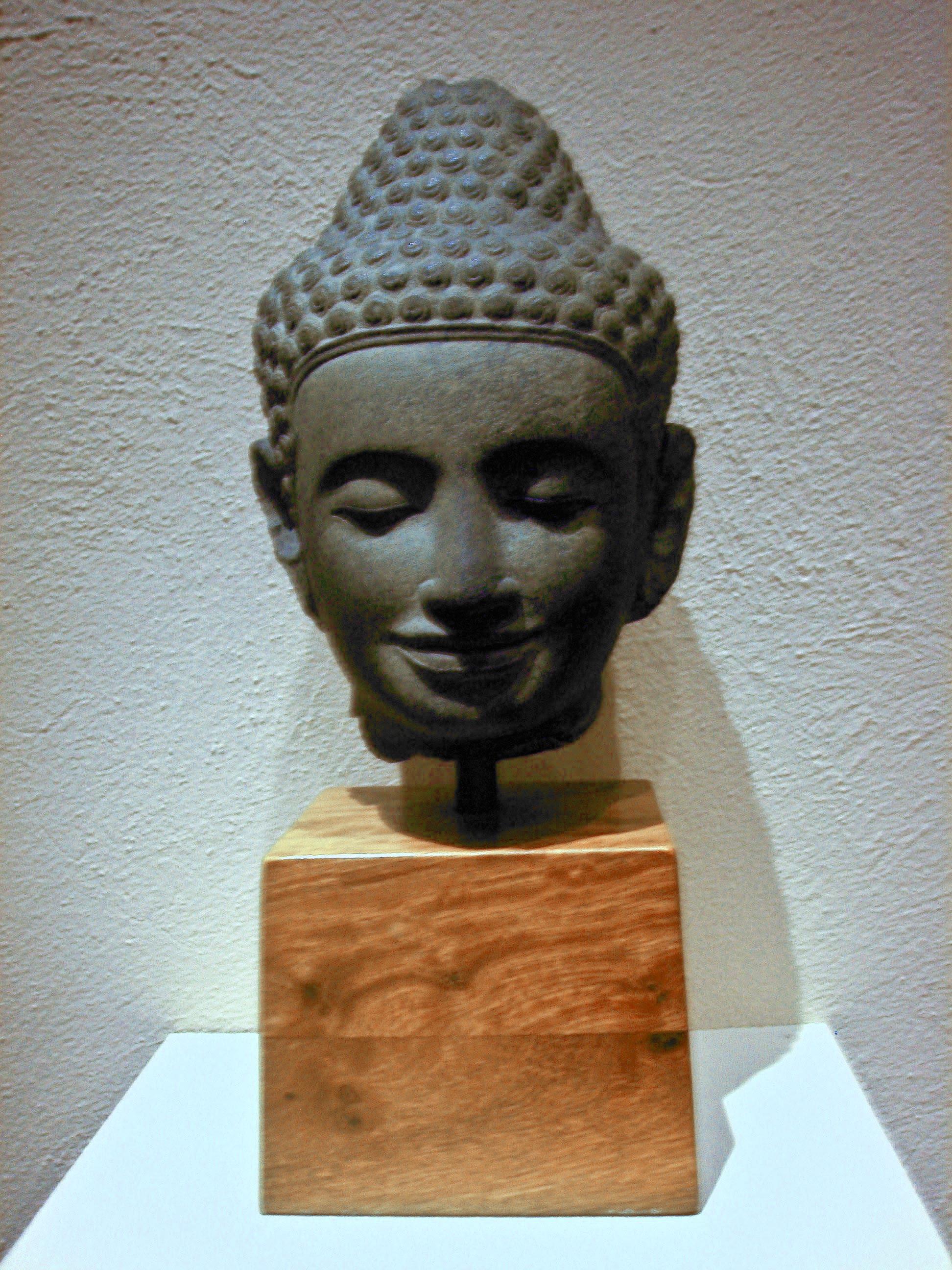
11th-century Khmer sculpture of the Buddha

The last Sanskrit inscription is dated 1327 and describes the succession of Indrajayavarman by Jayavarmadiparamesvara. Historians suspect a connection with the kings' adoption of Theravada Buddhism: the kings were no longer considered devarajas (god kings) and there was therefore no need to erect huge temples to them, or rather to the gods under whose protection they stood. The retreat from the concept of the devaraja may also have led to a loss of royal authority and thereby to a lack of workers. The water-management apparatus also degenerated, meaning that harvests were reduced by floods or drought. While previously three rice harvests per year were possible – a substantial contribution to the prosperity and power of Kambuja – the declining harvests further weakened the empire.

Looking at the archaeological record, however, archaeologists noticed that not only were the structures ceasing to be built, but the Khmer's historical inscription was also lacking from the 14th to 17th centuries. With this lack of historical content, there is very limited archaeological evidence to work with. However, archaeologists have been able to determine that the sites were abandoned and then reoccupied later by different people.

==== Foreign pressure ====
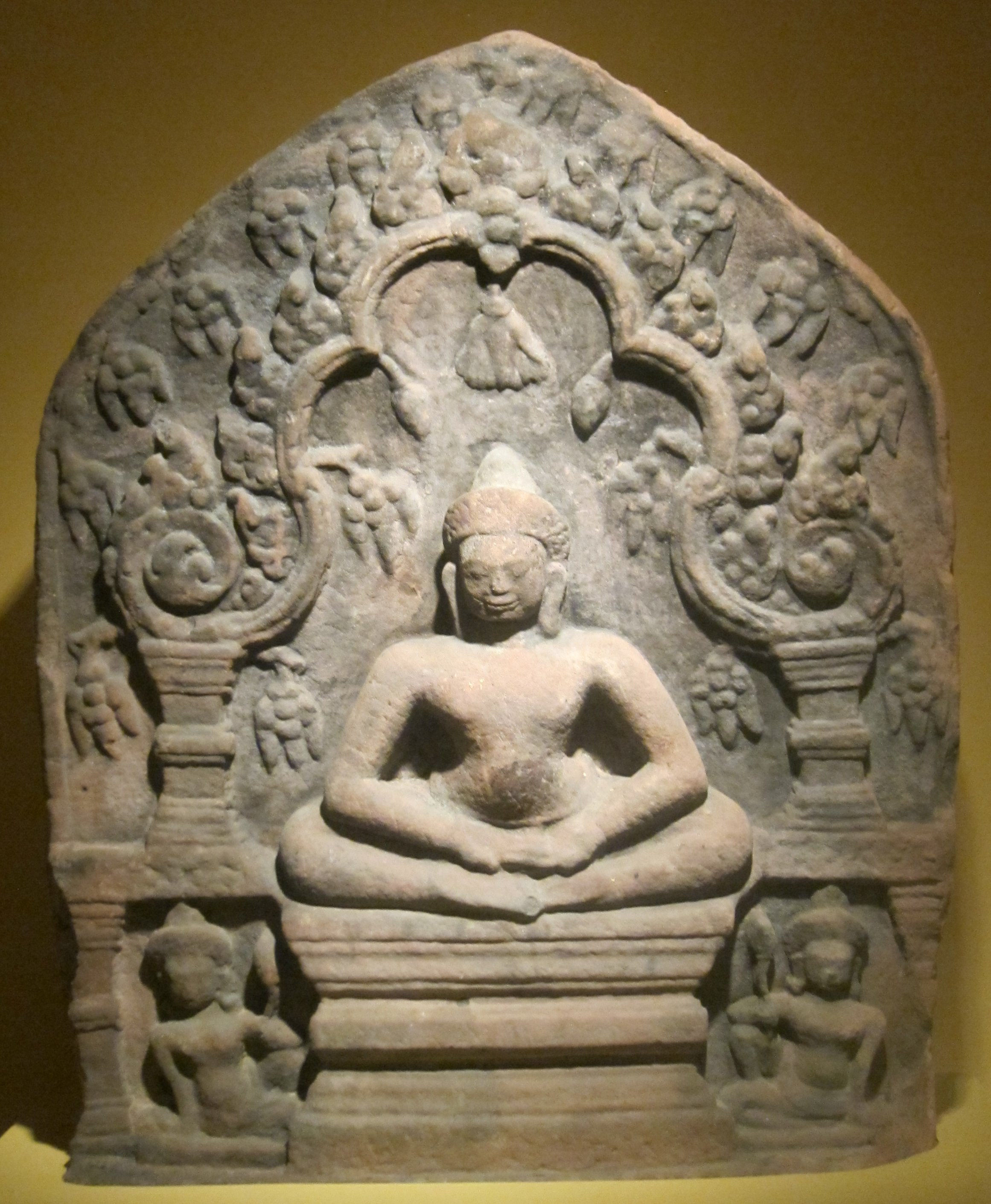
Seated Buddha from the 12th century

The Ayutthaya Kingdom arose from a confederation of three city-states on the Lower Chao Phraya basin (Ayutthaya-Suphanburi-Lopburi). From the fourteenth century onward, Ayutthaya became the Khmer empire's rival. Angkor was besieged by the Ayutthayan king Uthong in 1352, and following its capture the next year, the Khmer king was replaced with successive Siamese princes. Then in 1357, the Khmer king Suryavamsa Rajadhiraja retook the throne. In 1393, the Ayutthayan king Ramesuan besieged Angkor again, capturing it the next year. Ramesuan's son ruled Kambuja for a short time before being assassinated. Finally, in 1431, the Khmer king Ponhea Yat abandoned Angkor as indefensible, and moved to the Phnom Penh area.

The new centre of the Kambuja was in the southwest, at Oudong near present-day Phnom Penh. However, there are indications that Angkor was not completely abandoned. One line of Khmer kings may have remained there, while a second moved to Phnom Penh to establish a parallel kingdom. The final fall of Angkor would then be due to the transfer of economic – and therewith political – significance, as Phnom Penh became an important trade centre on the Mekong. Severe droughts and ensuing floods were considered one of the contributing factors to its fall. The empire focused more on regional trade after the first drought.

==== Ecological breakdown ====
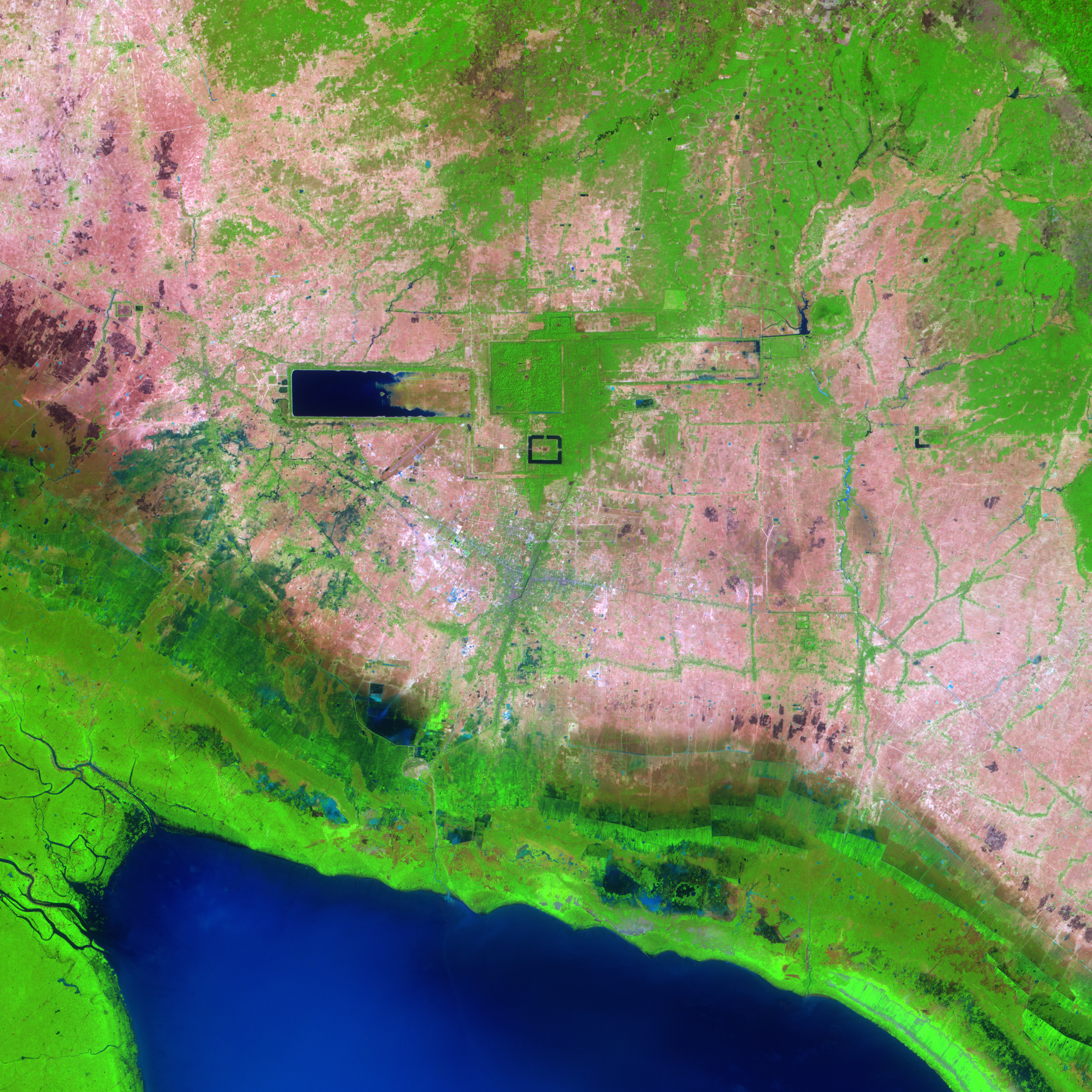
A satellite image of Angkor. The dried East Baray indicates environmental changes in the region.

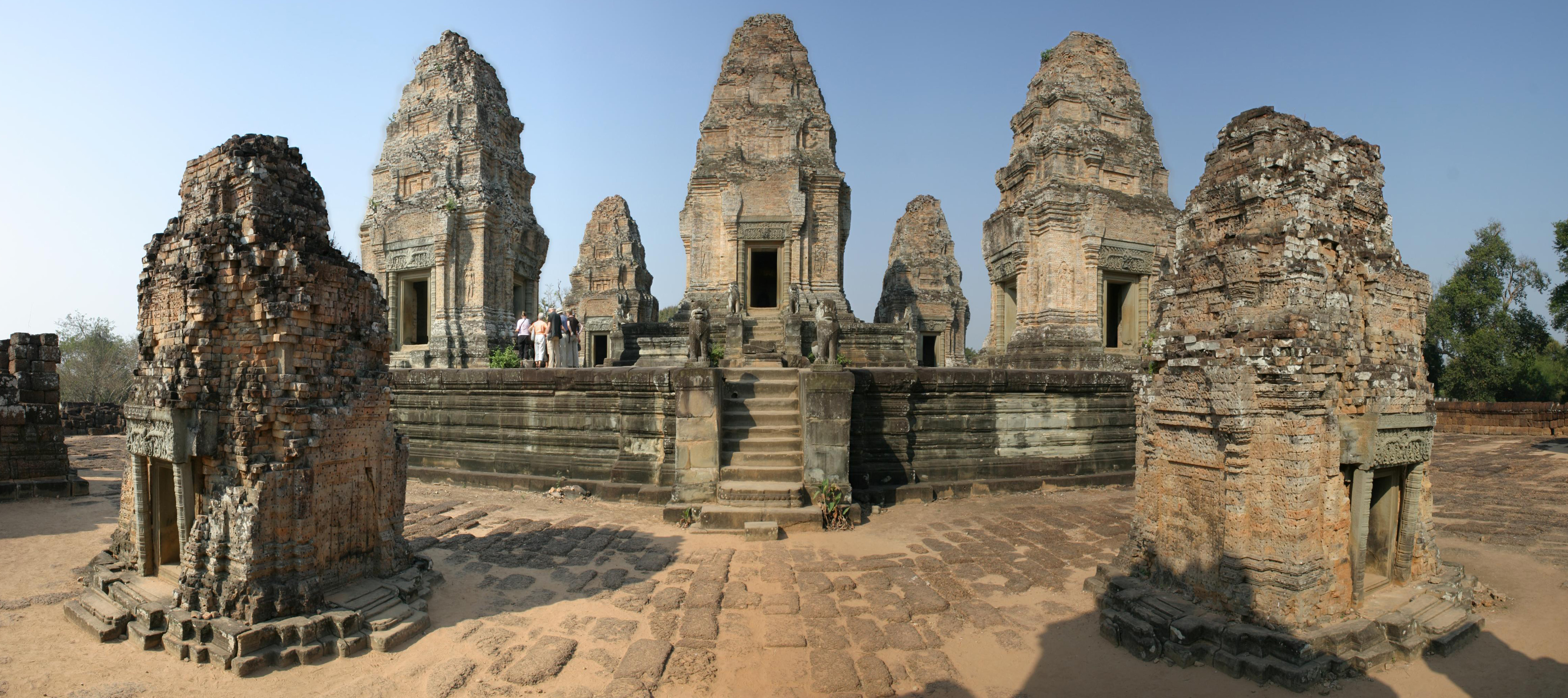
East Mebon temple is located at the centre of the now dried East Baray.

Ecological failure and infrastructural breakdown is an alternative theory regarding the end of Kambuja. Scientists working on the Greater Angkor Project believe that the Khmers had an elaborate system of reservoirs and canals used for trade, transportation, and irrigation. The canals were used for harvesting rice. As the population grew there was more strain on the water system. During the fourteenth and fifteenth centuries, there were also severe climatic changes impacting the water management system.

Periods of drought led to decreases in agricultural productivity, and violent floods due to monsoons damaged the infrastructure during this vulnerable time. To adapt to the growing population, trees were cut down from the Kulen hills and cleared out for more rice fields. That created rain runoff carrying sediment to the canal network. Any damage to the water system would have enormous consequences.

==== Black Death ====
The plague theory, which suggests a severe epidemic outbreak may have hit the heavily populated Angkor and contributed to the fall of the empire, has been reconsidered. By the 14th century, the Black Death had affected Asia, as the plague first appeared in China around 1330 and reached Europe around 1345. Most seaports along the line of travel from China to Europe felt the impact of the disease, which might have had a severe impact on life throughout Southeast Asia. Possible diseases include bubonic plague, smallpox, and malaria.

==== Rise of coastal commerce ====
Traditional Cambodian historians argued that Cambodia entered into a steep dark age after the fall of Angkor, however, recent scholarly work has come to question this perspective. Despite the great decline in Angkor's fortunes after the 15th century, Cambodian civilization moved its capital southwards towards the sea. The movement of the Khmer capital is fairly custom in the history of Southeast Asia. Whether it's due to famine, drought, or sackings, the kings of Angkor gradually shifted its capital to Longvek, close to modern day Phnom Penh, taking his retainers, nobles, and artisans with him. Cambodian civilization's fortunes after the fall of Angkor rose and fell. The later Khmer capital at Longvek became a great cosmopolitan entrepot of Southeast Asia and a center of international trade in the 16th century.

Most prominently, the historian Geoff Wade's Age of Commerce thesis posits that Southeast Asia experienced a dramatic increase in trade due to the rise of Chinese trading networks during the Song and Yuan Dynasty between 900 and 1300 CE. In the 13th century, the Mongol Yuan Dynasty paid special interest to Southeast Asia and sent various military expeditions to subjugate Dai Viet, Champa, and Java. Zhou Daguan, the famous Chinese vistor to Angkor, was a Yuan ambassador sent to get intelligence on Angkor and Southeast Asia for the Yuan court.

==== Angkor after the 15th century ====
There is evidence for a further period of use of Angkor after the 15th century. Under the rule of Khmer king Barom Reachea I (reigned 1566–1576), who temporarily succeeded in driving back Ayutthaya, the royal court was briefly returned to Angkor. Inscriptions from the 17th century testify to Japanese settlements alongside those of the remaining Khmer. The best-known inscription tells of Ukondayu Kazufusa, who celebrated the Khmer New Year in Angkor in 1632. However, in the following decades the Japanese community was absorbed into the local Khmer community, owing to a lack of new Japanese arrivals and thus little possibility of renewing their community.

== Culture and society ==
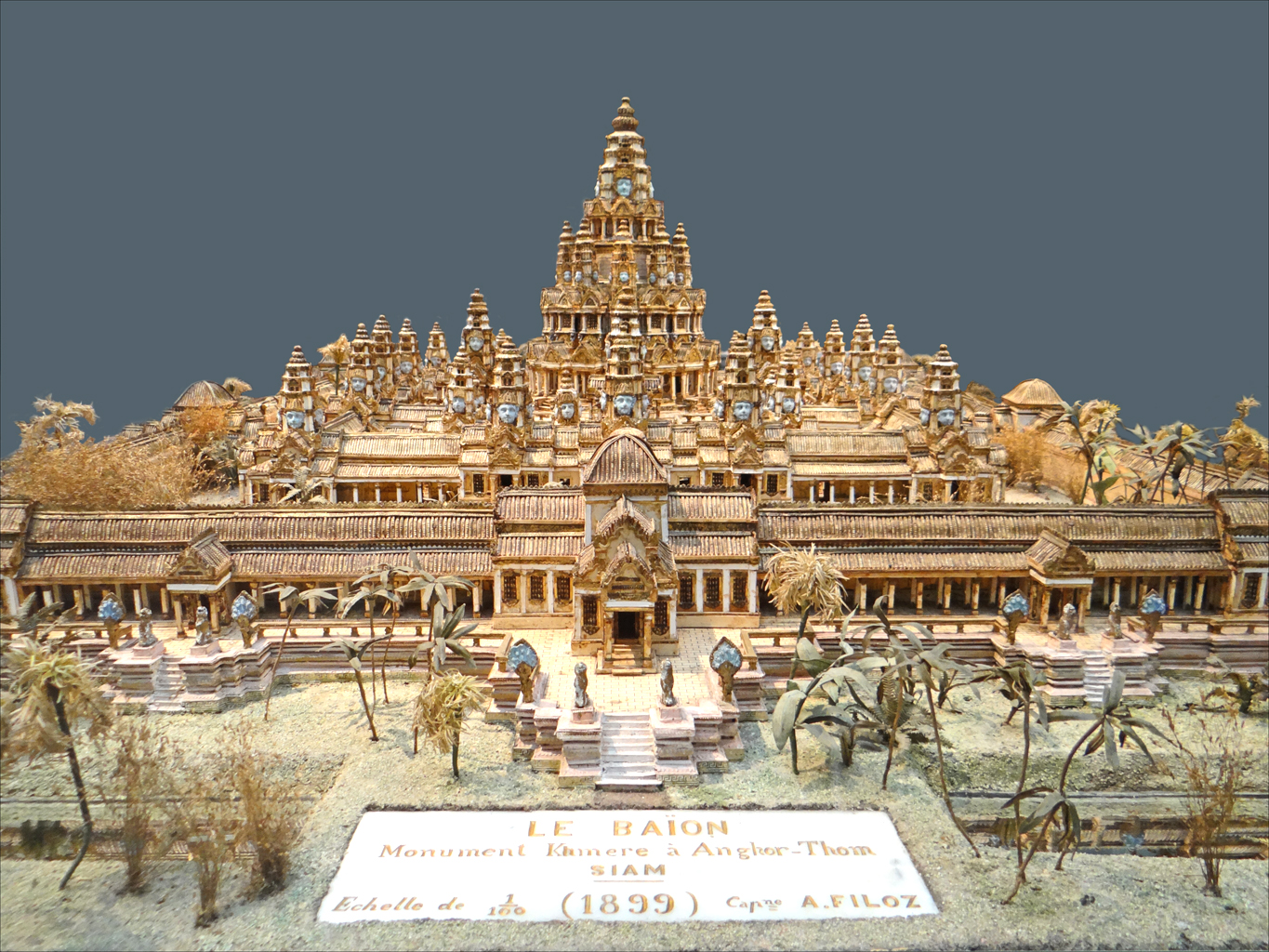
Reconstruction of the Bayon, the centre of Angkor Thom

Much of what is known about Kambuja comes from the bas-reliefs of Angkor's temples and the first-hand accounts of Chinese diplomat Zhou Daguan (The Customs of Cambodia), which provide information on 13th-century Cambodia and earlier. The bas-reliefs, such as those in the Bayon, describe everyday life in the ancient Khmer kingdom, including scenes of palace life, naval battles on the river and lakes, and common scenes of the marketplace.

=== Economy and agriculture ===
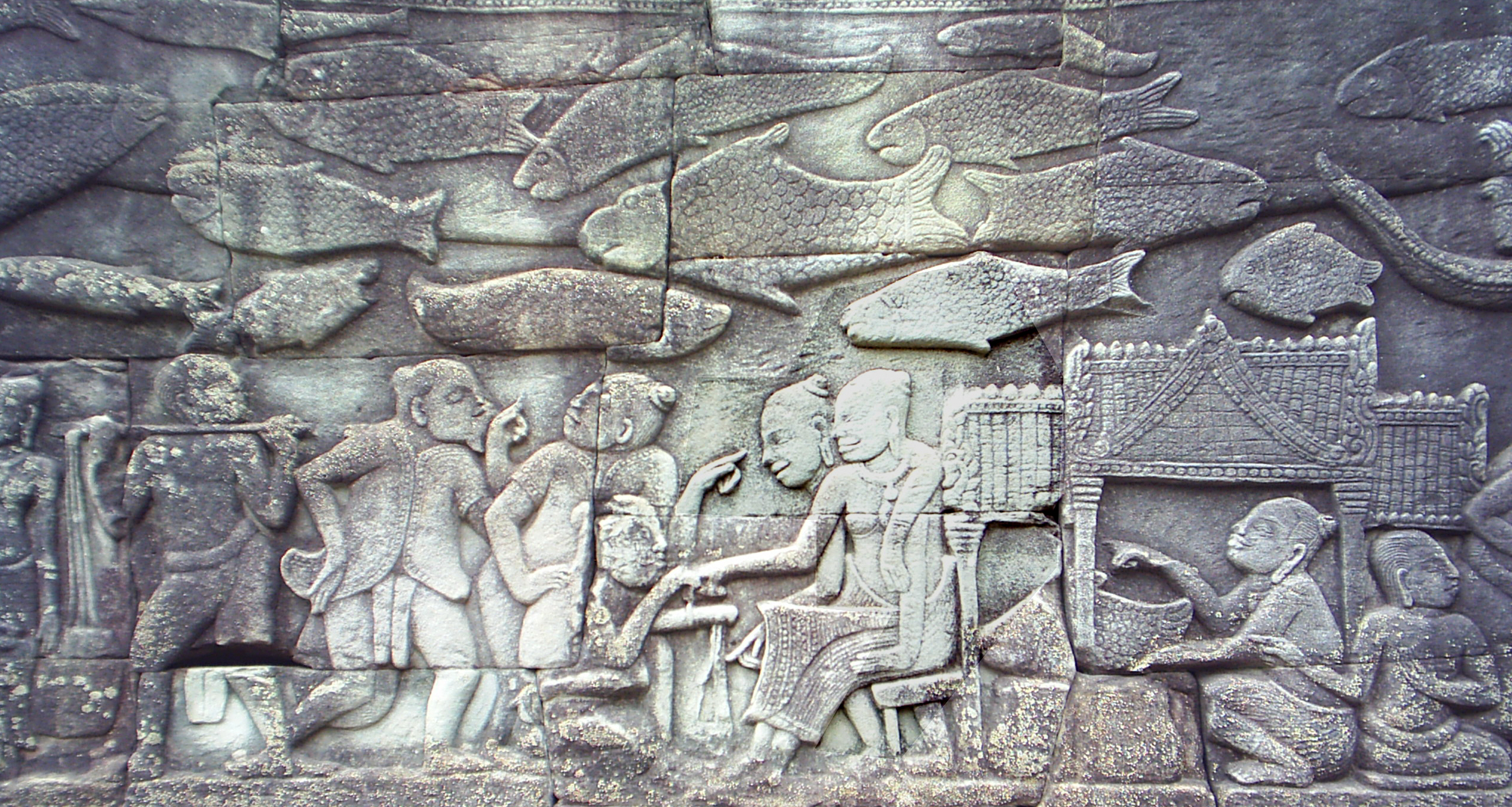
Khmer market in the Bayon

The ancient Khmers were a traditional agricultural community, relying heavily on rice farming. The farmers, who formed the majority of the kingdom's population, planted rice near the banks of the lake or river, in the irrigated plains surrounding their villages, or in the hills when the lowlands were flooded. The rice paddies were irrigated by a massive and complex hydraulics system, including networks of canals and barays, or giant water reservoirs. This system enabled the formation of large-scale rice farming communities surrounding Khmer cities. Sugar palm trees, fruit trees, and vegetables were grown in the orchards by the villages, providing other sources of agricultural produce such as palm sugar, palm wine, coconut, various tropical fruits, and vegetables.

Located by the massive Tonlé Sap lake, and also near numerous rivers and ponds, many Khmer people relied on fresh water fisheries for their living. Fishing gave the population their main source of protein, which was turned into prahok – dried or roasted or steamed fish paste wrapped in banana leaves. Rice was the main staple along with fish. Other sources of protein included pigs, cattle, and poultry, which were kept under the farmers' houses, which were elevated on stilts to protect them from flooding.

There is no clear evidence of monetized transactions during the Angkorian period until the 13th century, as barter was the main system of exchange. Envoy Zhou Daguan recorded in the 13th century on the use of rice, grain and Chinese coins for small transactions, cloth as another medium and lastly, gold and silver for the largest transactions.

The marketplace of Angkor contained no permanent buildings; it was an open square where the traders sat on the ground on woven straw mats and sold their wares. There were no tables or chairs. Some traders might be protected from the sun with a simple thatched parasol. A certain type of tax or rent was levied by officials for each space occupied by traders in the marketplace. The trade and economy in the Angkor marketplace were mainly run by women.

Zhou Daguan's description of the women of Angkor:

The local people who know how to trade are all women. So when a Chinese man goes to this country, the first thing he must do is take in a woman, partly with a view of profiting from her trading abilities.

The women age very quickly, no doubt because they marry and give birth when they are too young. When they are twenty or thirty-years-old, they look like Chinese women who are forty or fifty.

The role of women in the trade and economy of Kambuja suggests that they enjoyed significant rights and freedom. Their practice of marrying early may have contributed to the high fertility rate and huge population of the kingdom.

=== Society and politics ===
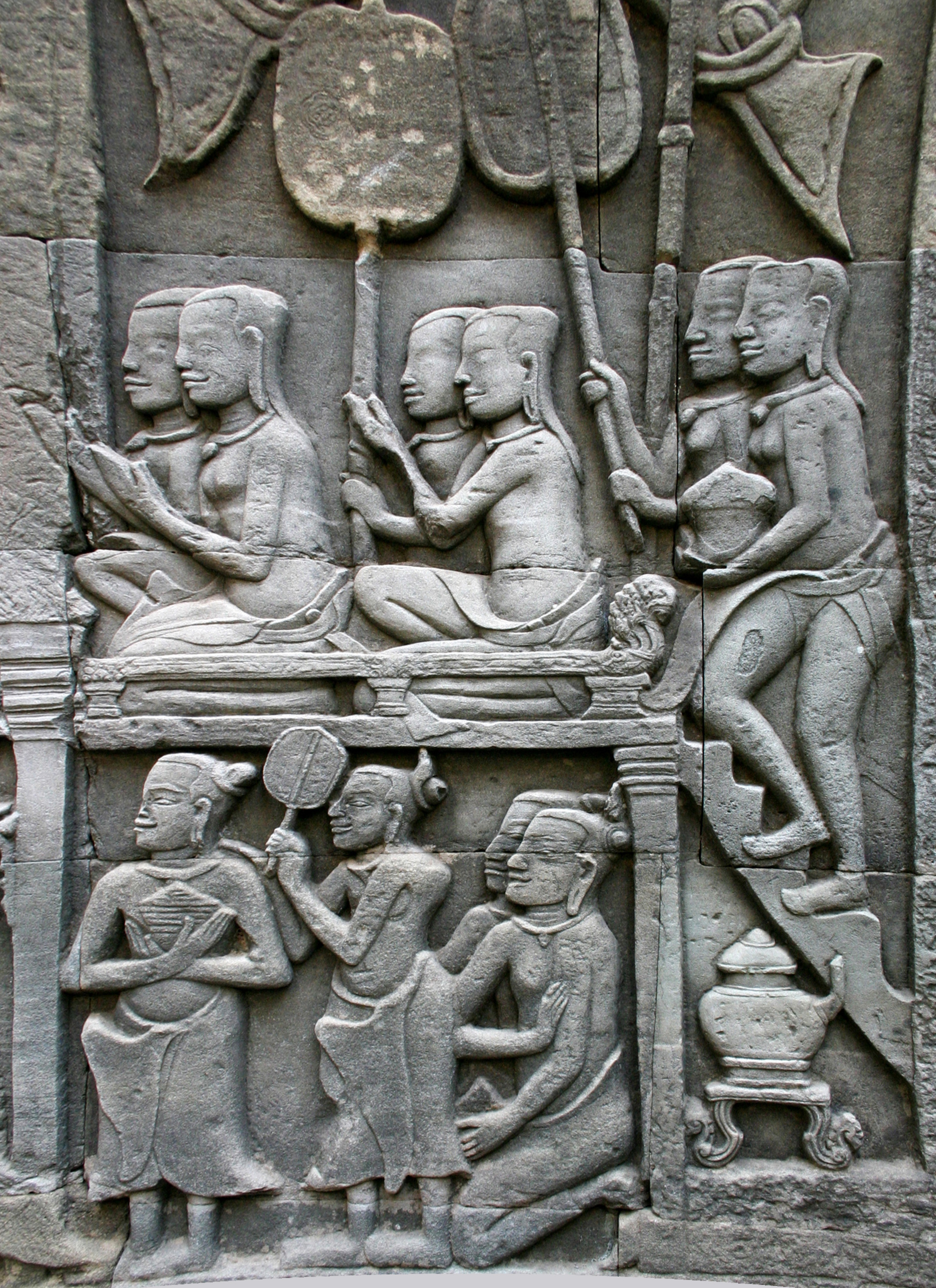
Women of the royal court

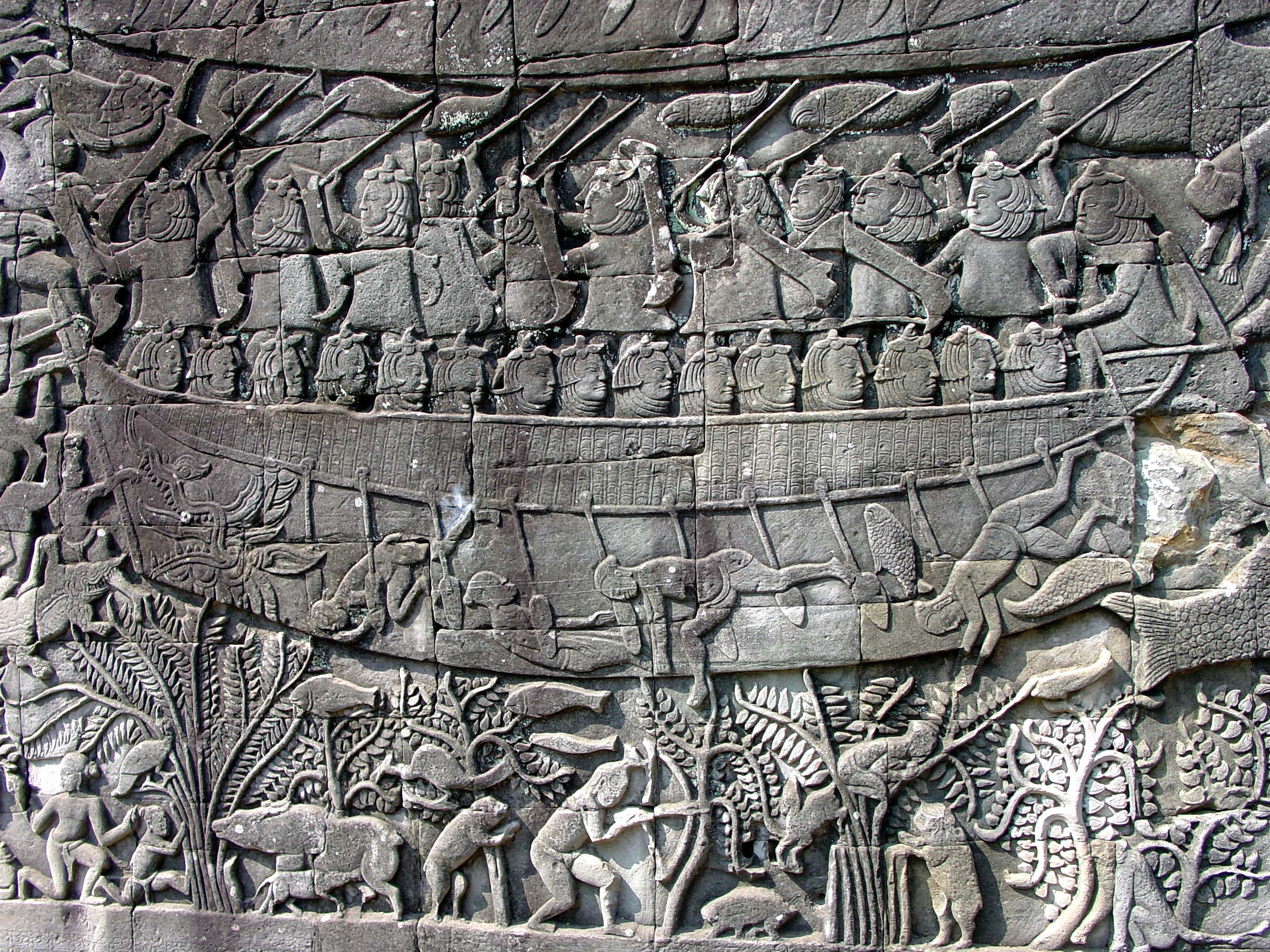
A naval battle against the Chams; relief in the Bayon

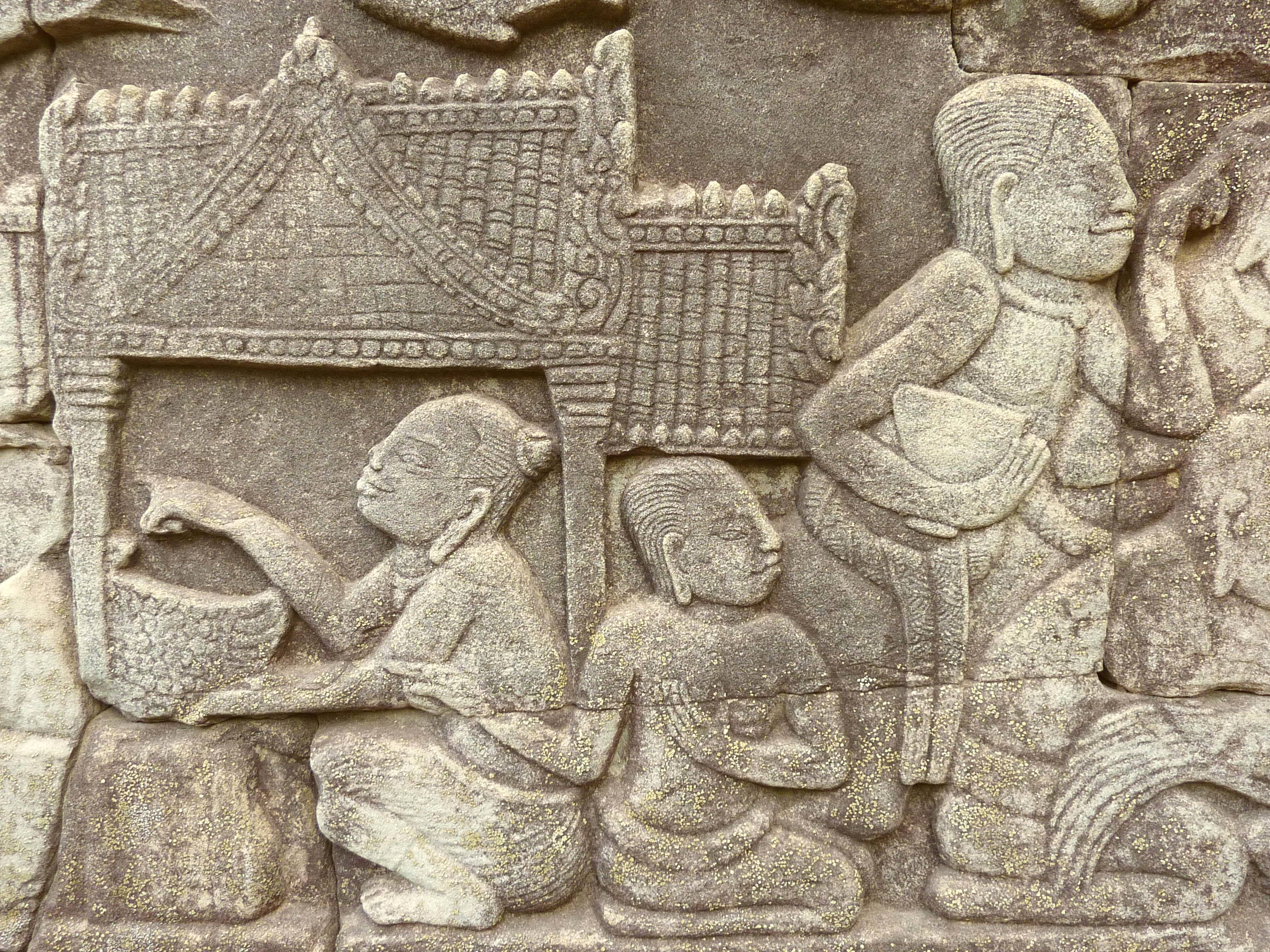
Bas-relief in the Bayon depicting home life

Kambuja was founded upon extensive networks of agricultural rice farming communities. A distinct settlement hierarchy is present in the region. Small villages were clustered around regional centres, such as the one at Phimai, which in turn sent their goods to large cities like Angkor in return for other goods, such as pottery and foreign trade items from China. Inscriptions from what is now Sa Kaeo and Prachin Buri, west of the Dângrêk, carry the administrative vocabulary of that hierarchy. Villages and districts are marked by the terms sruk, grāma and viṣaya, and towns are named Vijaya pattana, Bhadhara pattana and Avadhayapura. Patcharaporn Ngernkerd and colleagues read that group of texts as evidence that the northern part of Sa Kaeo was administered directly from Angkor. The king and his officials were in charge of irrigation management and water distribution, which consisted of an intricate series of hydraulics infrastructure, such as canals, moats, and massive reservoirs called barays.

Society was arranged in a hierarchy reflecting the Hindu caste system, where the commoners – rice farmers and fishermen – formed the large majority of the population. The kshatriyas – royalty, nobles, warlords, soldiers, and warriors – formed a governing elite and authorities. Other social classes included brahmins (priests), traders, artisans such as carpenters and stonemasons, potters, metalworkers, goldsmiths, and textile weavers, while on the lowest social level were slaves.

The extensive irrigation projects provided rice surpluses that could support a large population. The state religion was Hinduism but influenced by the cult of Devaraja, elevating the Khmer kings as possessing the divine quality of living gods on earth, attributed to the incarnation of Vishnu or Shiva. In politics, this status was viewed as the divine justification of a king's rule. The cult enabled the Khmer kings to embark on massive architectural projects, constructing majestic monuments such as Angkor Wat and the Bayon to celebrate the king's divine rule on earth.

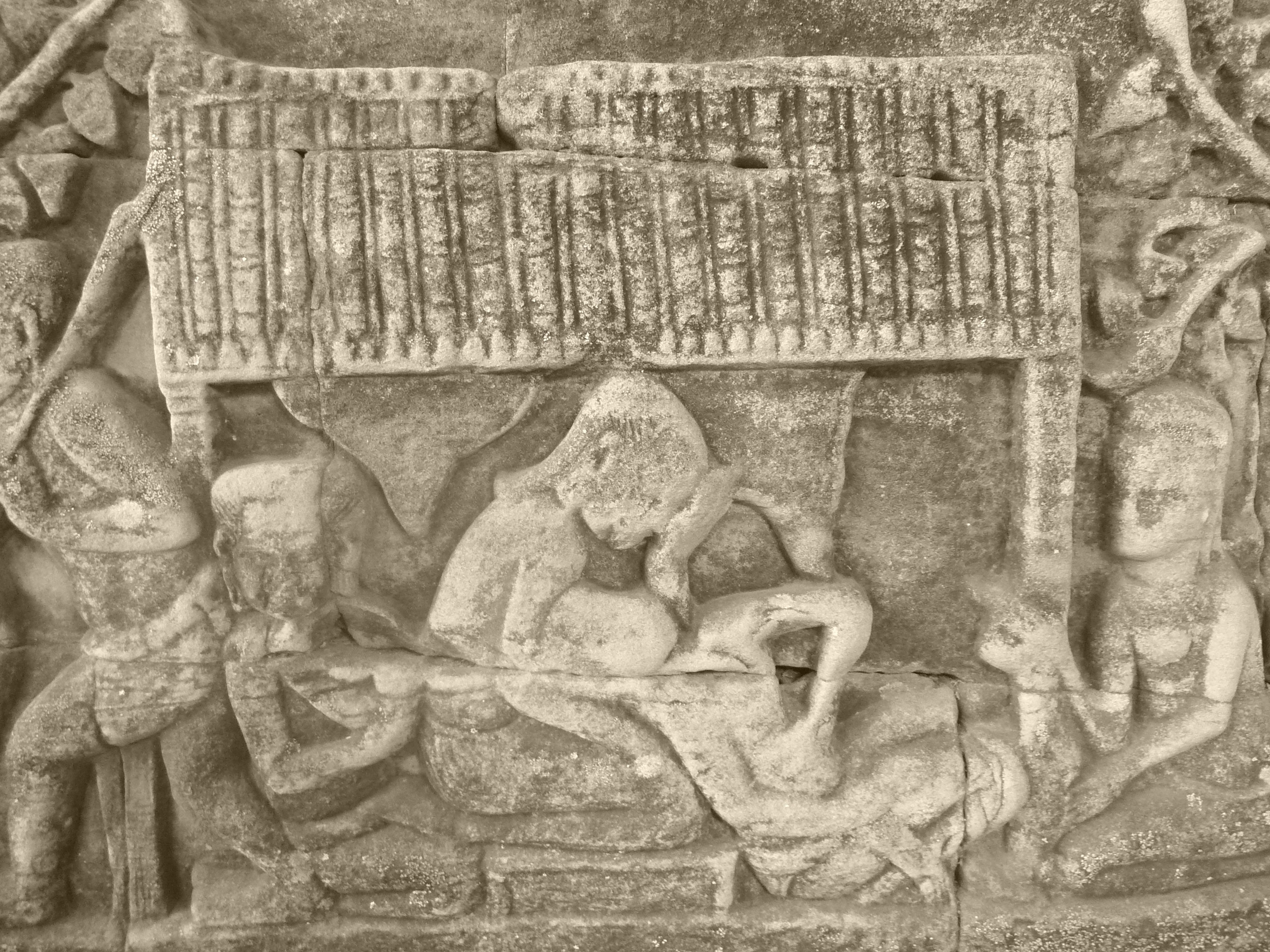
Bas-relief in the Bayon depicting childbirth

The King was surrounded by ministers, state officials, nobles, royalties, palace women, and servants, all protected by guards and troops. The capital city of Angkor and the Khmer royal court are famous for grand ceremonies, with many festivals and rituals held in the city. Even when travelling, the King and his entourages created quite a spectacle, as described in Zhou Daguan's accounts. Zhou Daguan's description of a royal procession of Indravarman III is as follows:

When the king goes out, troops are at the head of [his] escort; then come flags, banners and music. Palace women, numbering from three to five hundred, wearing flowered cloth, with flowers in their hair, hold candles in their hands, and form a troupe. Even in broad daylight, the candles are lighted. Then come other palace women, bearing royal paraphernalia made of gold and silver... Then come the palace women carrying lances and shields, with the king's private guards. Carts drawn by goats and horses, all in gold, come next. Ministers and princes are mounted on elephants, and in front of them one can see, from afar, their innumerable red umbrellas. After them come the wives and concubines of the king, in palanquins, carriages, on horseback and on elephants. They have more than one hundred parasols, flecked with gold. Behind them comes the sovereign, standing on an elephant, holding his sacred sword in his hand. The elephant's tusks are encased in gold.

Zhou Daguan's description of the Khmer king's wardrobe:

Only the ruler can dress in cloth with an all-over floral design...Around his neck he wears about three pounds of big pearls. At his wrists, ankles and fingers he has gold bracelets and rings all set with cat's eyes...When he goes out, he holds a golden sword [of state] in his hand.

Khmer kings were often involved in series of wars and conquests. The large population of Angkor enabled the empire to support large free standing armies, which were sometimes deployed to conquer neighbouring princedoms or kingdoms. Series of conquests were led to expand the empire's influence over areas surrounding Angkor and Tonle Sap, the Mekong valley and delta, and surrounding lands. Some Khmer kings embarked on military conquests and war against neighbouring Champa, Dai Viet, and Thai warlords. Khmer kings and royal families were also often involved in incessant power struggle over successions or rivalries over principalities.

Ancient Southeast Asian political philosophy meant that the Khmer Empire, centered on the capital of Angkor, was the centerpiece of the Angkorian Empire. The governance and prestige of the Angkorian Empire was heavily centered on the city of Angkor itself. Angkor was in many ways a city-state with an empire. The Emperors of Angkor spent much of their time in Angkor and the great palaces and temples of the Angkorian Empire were heavily concentrated in the capital of Angkor itself.

=== Military ===
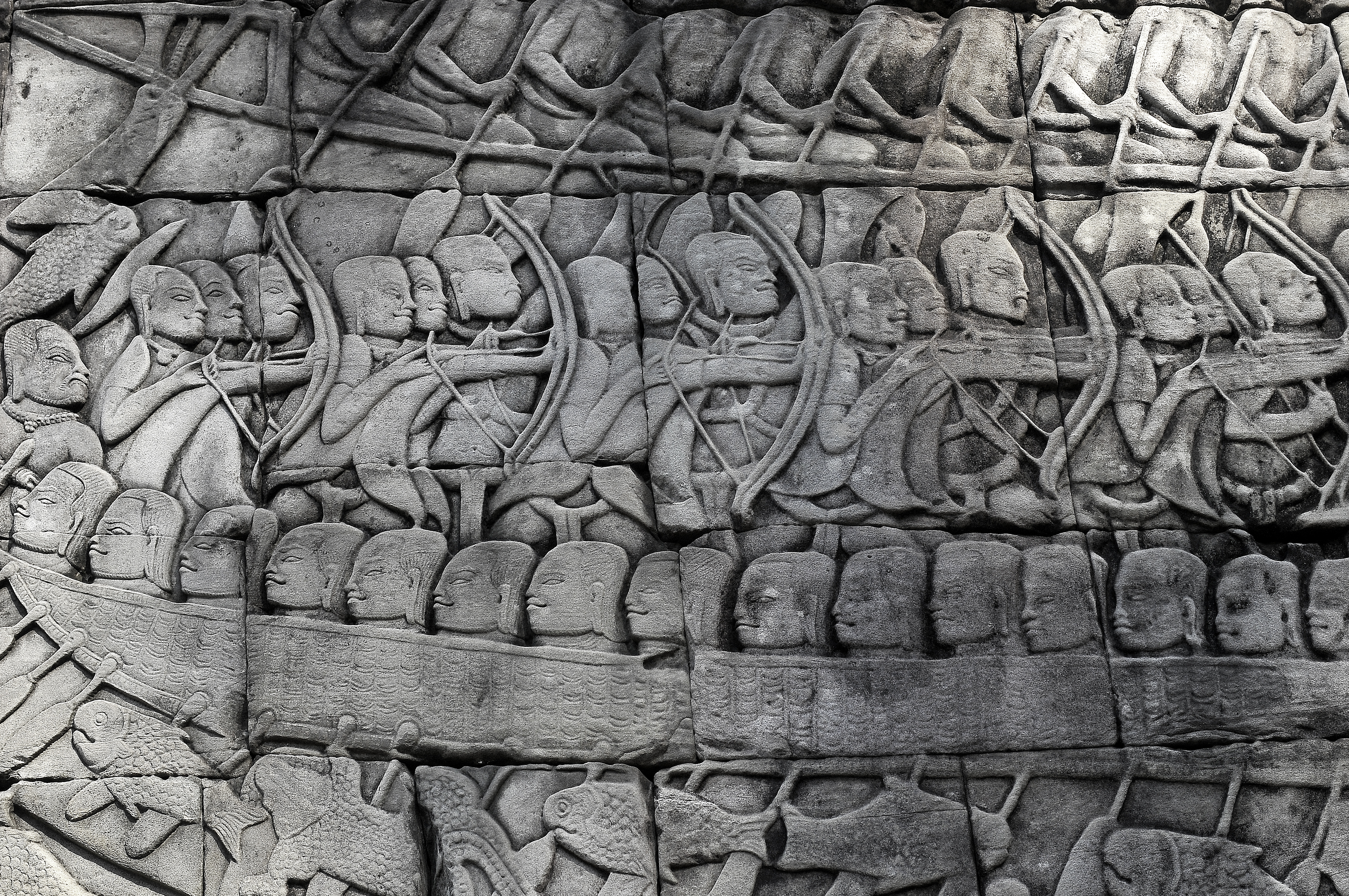
A bas-relief depicting Khmer naval soldiers using bow and arrows. Located in the Bayon, created c. 12th-13th century.

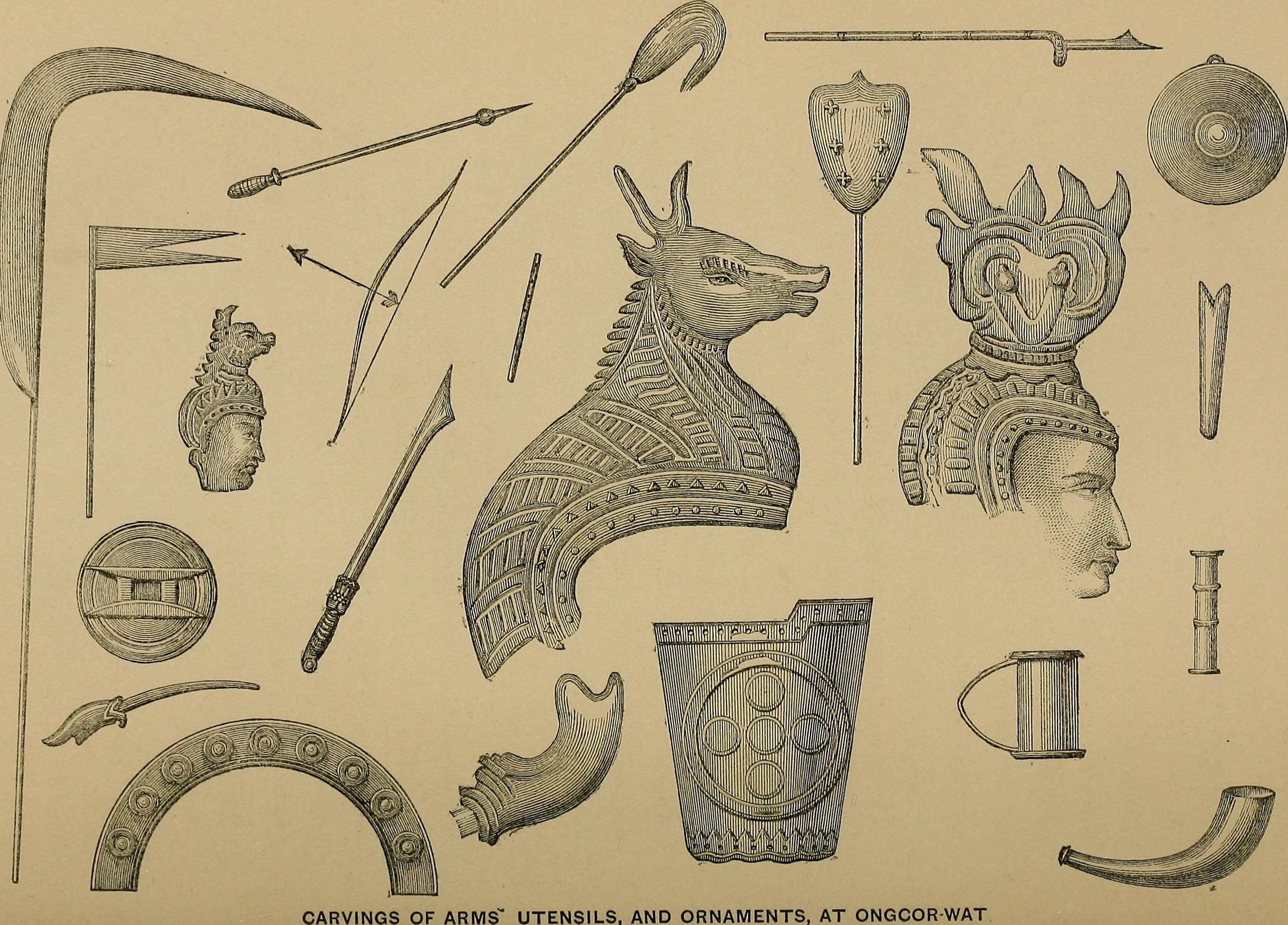
Helmets, weapons, and armoury of Kambuja's military as depicted in Angkor Wat. Taken from French explorer Henri Mouhot's book.

According to Zhou Daguan, who stayed in Yaśodharapura from 1296 to 1297, Cambodia had suffered repeated attacks by the people of Xiān, a polity of the western side of the Bay of Bangkok whose identification with the Sukhothai Kingdom has been questioned since 1989, the Chinese records listing Xiān and Sukhothai separately. According to Zhou, the Khmer soldiers fought naked and barefoot, wielding only lance and shield. He did not witness any usage of bows and arrows (although bows and arrow are depicted in bas-relief at the Bayon), trebuchets, body armour, or helmets. When Sukhotai attacked, ordinary people were ordered to face them without strategy or preparation. The Khmer had double bow crossbows mounted on elephants, which Michel JacqHergoualc'h suggests were elements of Cham mercenaries in Jayavarman VII's army.

In terms of fortifications, Zhou described Angkor Thom's walls as being 10 kilometres (6.2 mi) long in circumference with five gateways, each with two gates, surrounded by a large moat spanned by bridges. The walls, which formed an exact square, were made of stone and so tightly packed that no weeds grew from them. The walls were around 6–7 metres in height and sloped from the inside, thick enough to contain chambers, but with no battlements and only a single stone tower on each of the four sides. Guards operated them, but dogs were not allowed on the walls. According to an oral tradition told to Henri Mouhot, Kambuja had a standing army of 5 to 6 million soldiers.

=== Culture and way of life ===
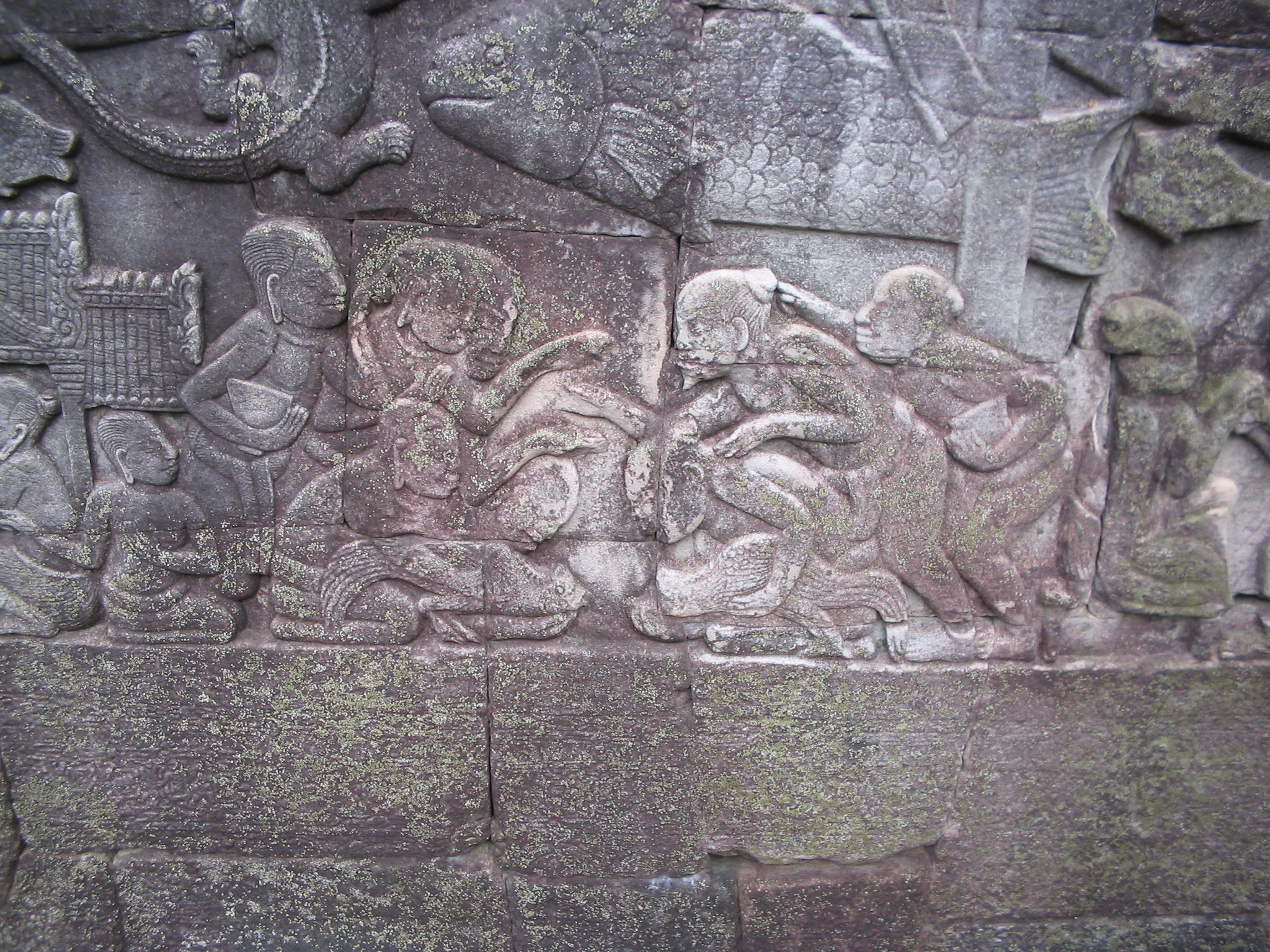
Relief in the Bayon depicting cockfighting

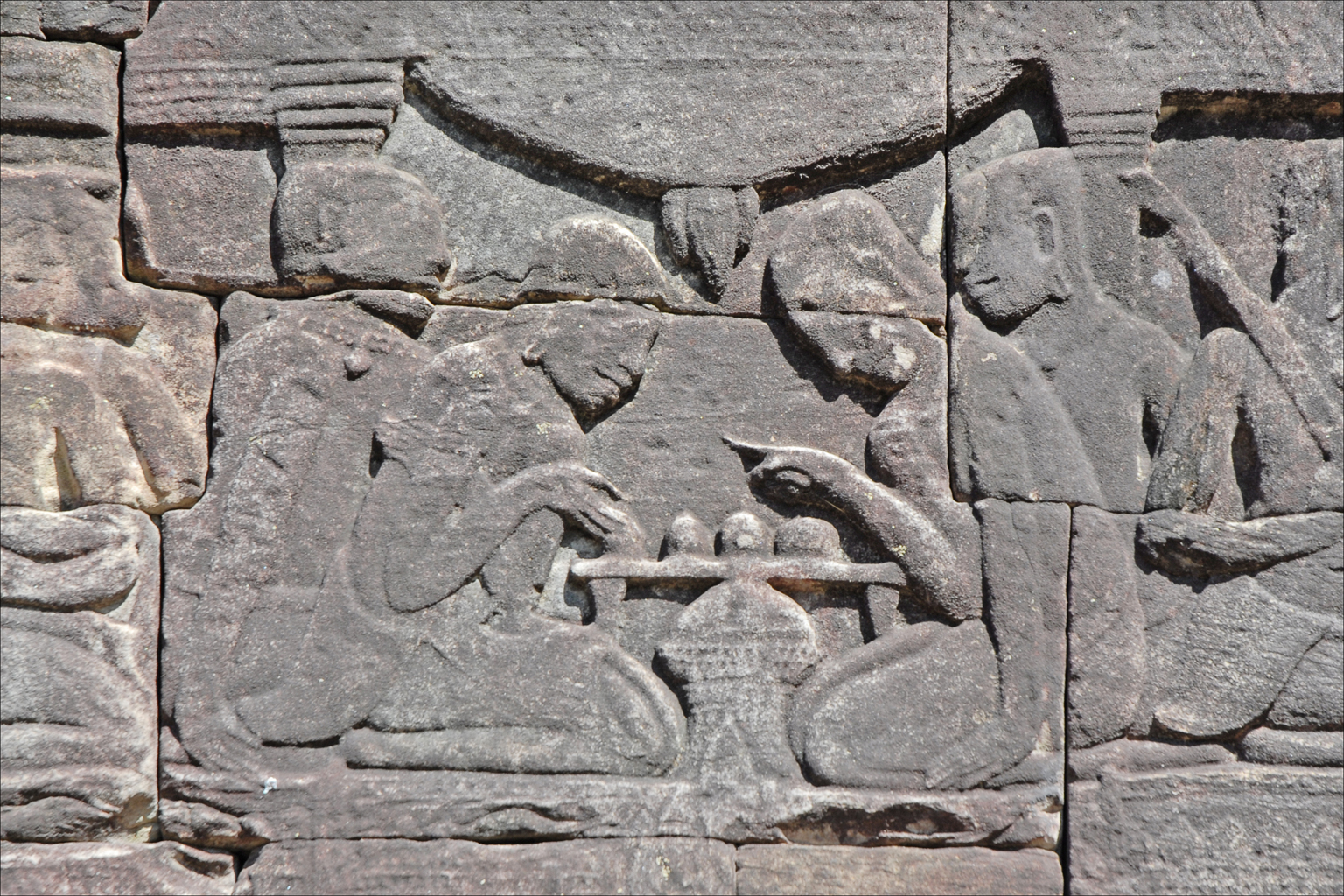
Bas-relief depicting people playing a chess-like game

Zhou Daguan's description of Khmer houses:

The dwellings of the princes and principal officials have a completely different layout and dimensions from those of the people. All the outlying buildings are covered with thatch; only the family temple and the principal apartment can be covered in tiles. The official rank of each person determines the size of the houses.

Houses of farmers were situated near the rice paddies on the edge of the cities. The walls of the houses were made of woven bamboo, with thatched roofs, and they were on stilts. A house was divided into three rooms by woven bamboo walls. One was the parents' bedroom, another was the daughters' bedroom, and the largest was the living area. Sons slept wherever they could find space. The kitchen was at the back or in a separate room. Nobles and kings lived in the palace and much larger houses in the city. They were made of the same materials as the farmers' houses, but the roofs were wooden shingles and had elaborate designs as well as more rooms.

Zhou Daguan reported that locals do not produce silk or have the ability to stitch and darn with a needle and thread.

None of the locals produces silk. Nor do the women know how to stitch and darn with a needle and thread. The only thing they can do is weave cotton from kapok. Even then they cannot spin the yarn, but just use their hands to gather the cloth into strands. They do not use a loom for weaving. Instead they just wind one end of the cloth around their waist, hang the other end over a window, and use a bamboo tube as a shuttle. In recent years people from Siam have come to live in Cambodia, and unlike the locals they engage in silk production. The mulberry trees they grow and the silkworms they raise all come from Siam. They themselves weave the silk into clothes made of a black, patterned satiny silk. Siamese women do know how to stitch and darn, so when local people have torn or damaged clothing they ask them to do the mending.

The common people wore a sampot where the front end was drawn between the legs and secured at the back by a belt. Nobles and kings wore finer and richer fabrics. Women wore a strip of cloth to cover the chest, while noble women had a lengthened one that went over the shoulder. Men and women wore a Krama. Along with depictions of battle and the military conquests of kings, the basreliefs of the Bayon depict the mundane everyday life of common Khmer people, including scenes of the marketplace, fishermen, butchers, people playing a chess-like game, and gambling during cockfighting.

=== Religion ===
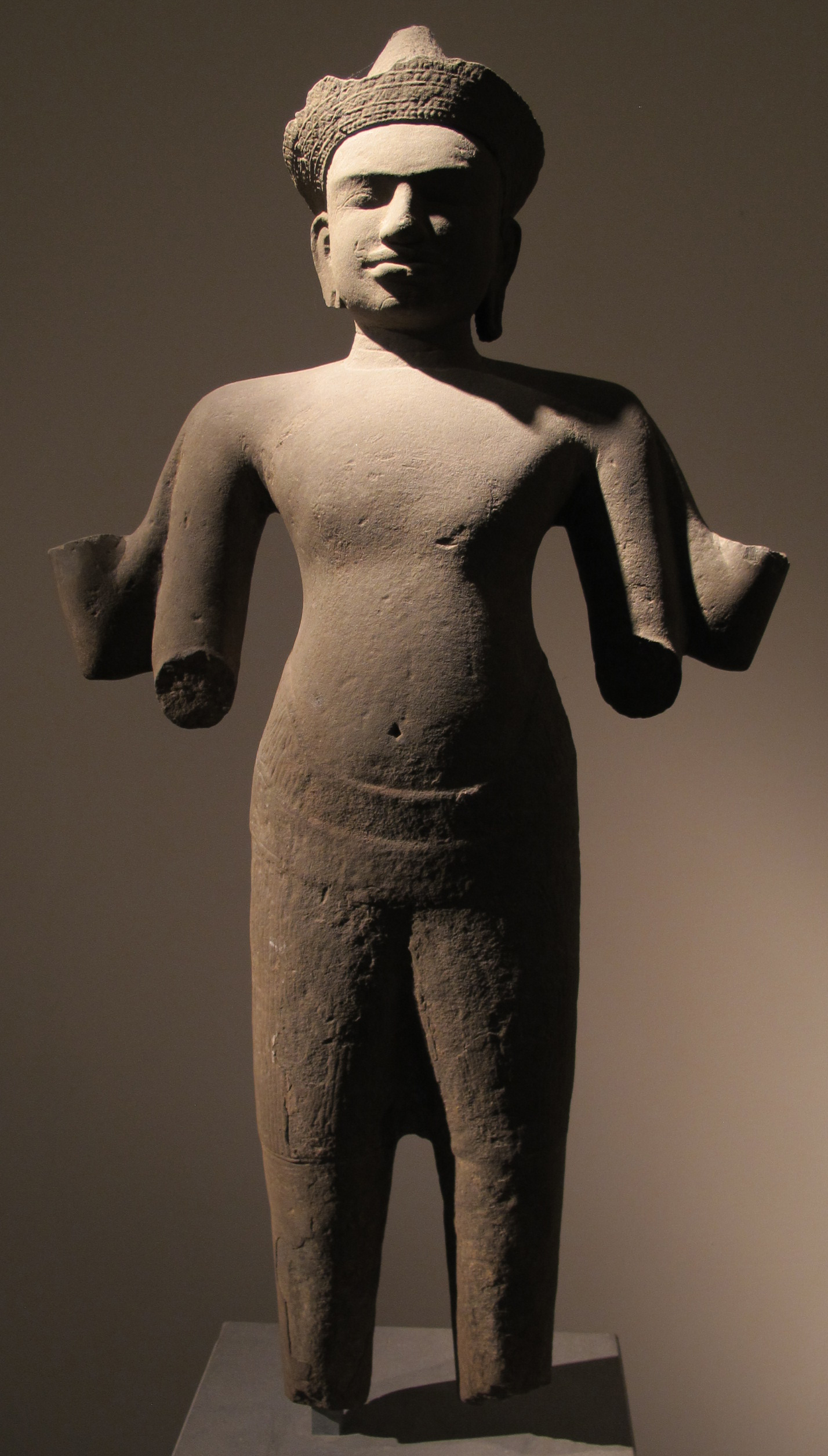
Vishnu, Baphuon style

The main religion was Hinduism, followed by Buddhism in popularity. Initially, the kingdom revered Hinduism as the main state religion. Vishnu and Shiva were the most revered deities, worshipped in Khmer Hindu temples. Temples such as Angkor Wat are actually known as Phitsanulok (Vara Vishnuloka in Sanskrit) or the realm of Vishnu, to honour the posthumous King Suryavarman II as Vishnu. Throughout its history, Khmer Hinduism was always deeply syncretic with other religions, particularly the ancient Khmer folk religions and eventually Theravada Buddhism.

Hindu ceremonies and rituals performed by Brahmins (Hindu priests), usually only held among the ruling elites of the king's family, nobles, and the ruling class. The empire's official religions included Hinduism and Mahayana Buddhism until Theravada Buddhism prevailed, even among the lower classes, after its introduction from Sri Lanka in the 13th century.

==== Emergence of Theravada Buddhism ====
Following the peak of Hinduism in Cambodia under the reign of Jayavarman VII, Hinduism gradually fell into decline over the last centuries of the Khmer Empire, and gradually was replaced by Theravada Buddhism, which incorporated and borrowed many elements of Hinduism. The Hindu temples of the Khmer Empire gradually were converted into Theravada Buddhist temples, including Angkor Wat. However, Theravada Buddhism in Angkor always carried a strong leftover trace of Hinduism in the centuries leading to and after the fall of Angkor. However, the conversion of the Angkorian Empire to Buddhism is believed to have fundamentally destabilized Angkorian kingship, which was heavily reliant on Hindu kingship and orthodox customs, which may have played a role in Angkor's decline.

The Hindu kings of Angkor required thousands of unpaid laborers in order to construct the grand temples of Angkor and the Khmer Empire, much to the resentment of the Khmer peasantry. The rise of Theravada Buddhism seemed to have forced the Khmer rulers to embrace more egalitarian forms of rule and reject the heavy manpower construction projects like Angkor Wat. The arrival and spread of Theravada Buddhism seemed to have also spread a new wave of evangelization to the Khmer peasantry and making the Khmer peasantry more invested into the kingdom, at the cost of abandoning Hinduism and the massive construction projects.

=== Art and architecture ===
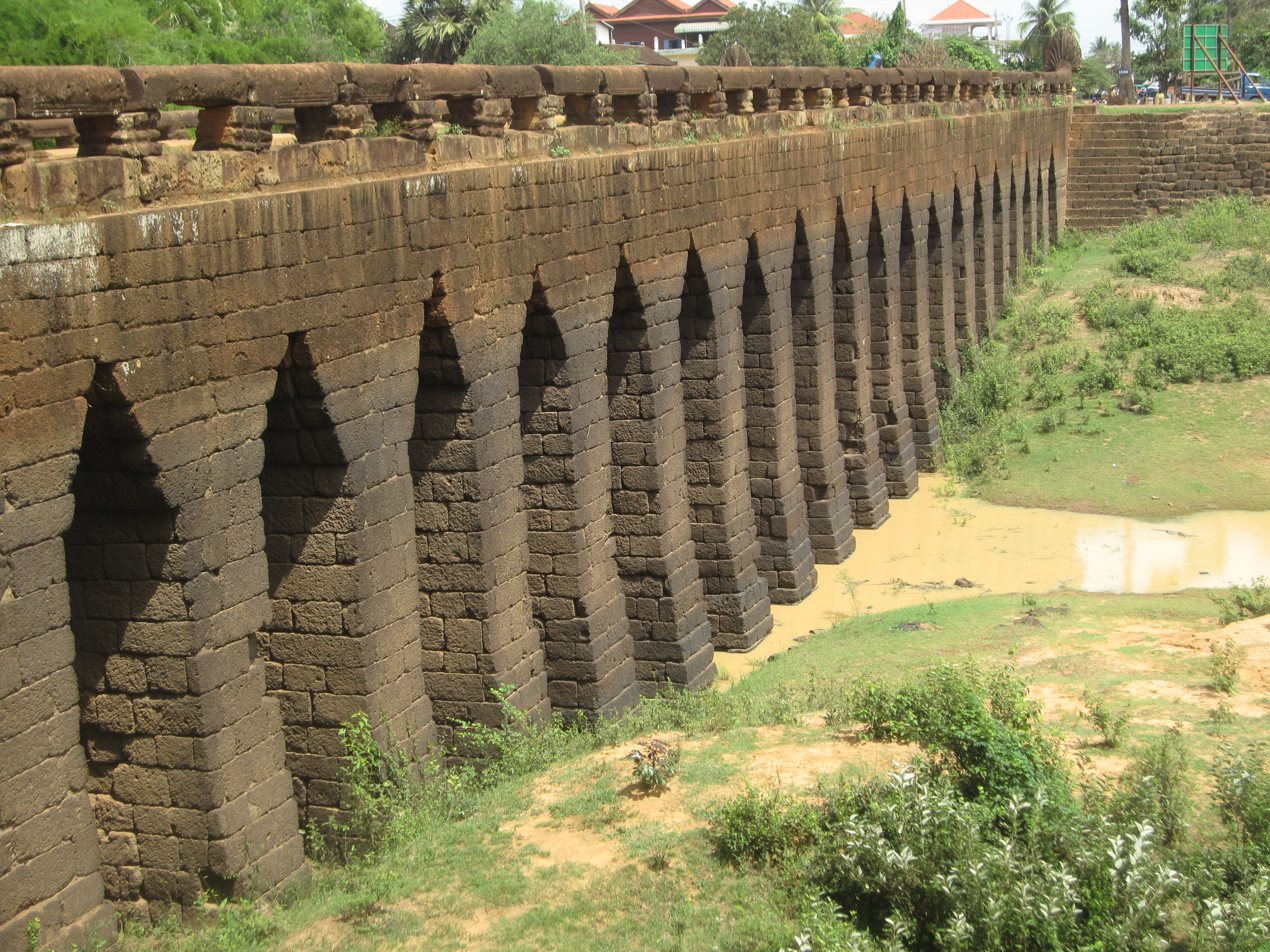
Kambuja's Spean Praptos, a corbel bridge in present-day Siem Reap Province, Cambodia

Zhou Daguan's description on the Angkor Royal Palace:

All official buildings and homes of the aristocracy, including the Royal Palace, face the east. The Royal Palace stands north of the Golden Tower and the Bridge of Gold: it is one and a half mile in circumference. The tiles of the main dwelling are of lead. Other dwellings are covered with yellow-coloured pottery tiles. Carved or painted Buddhas decorate all the immense columns and lintels. The roofs are impressive too. Open corridors and long colonnades, arranged in harmonious patterns, stretch away on all sides.

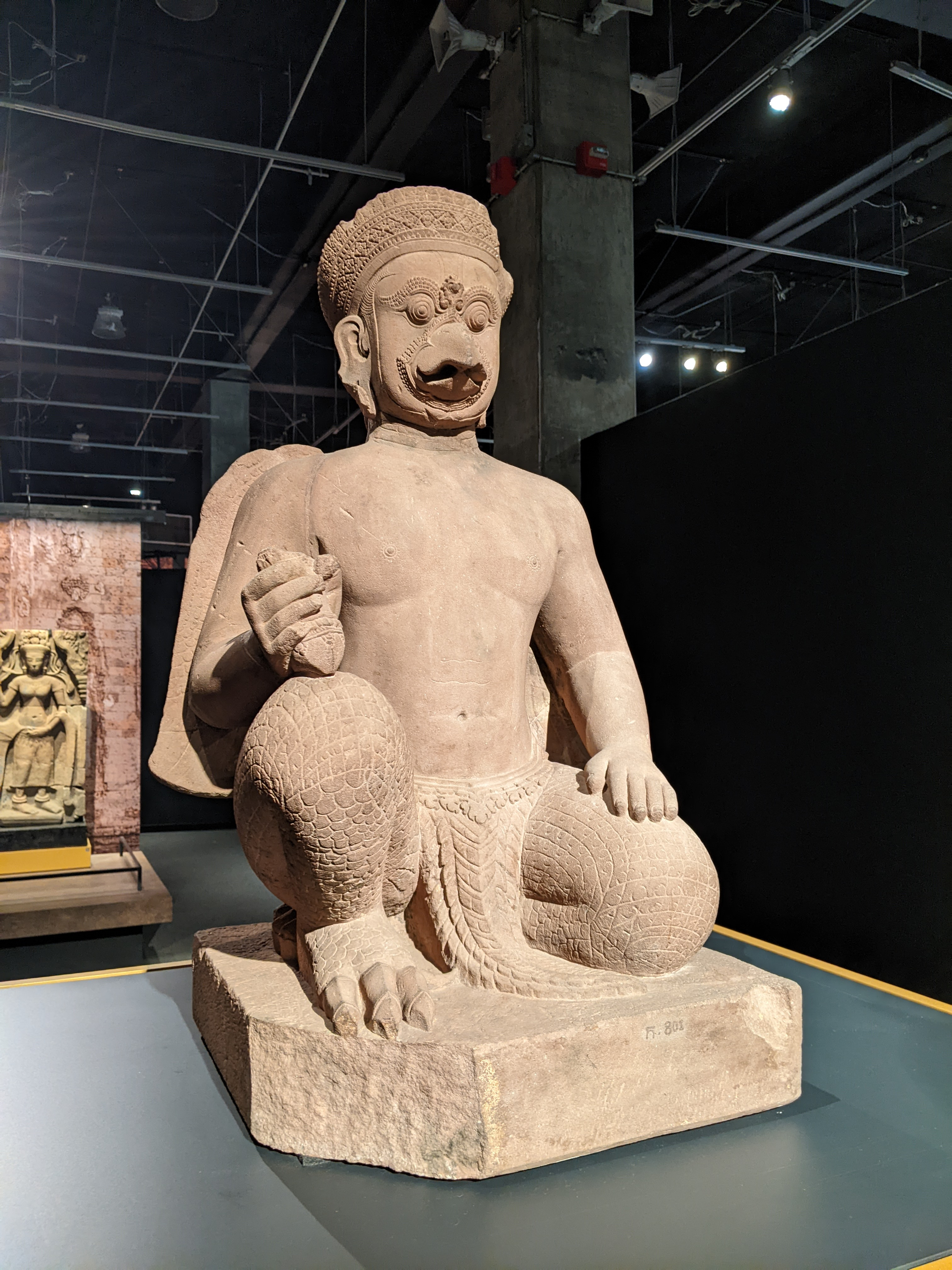
Angkorian Garuda statue on visiting display at California Science Center

The Angkor Empire produced numerous temples and majestic monuments to celebrate the divine authority of Khmer kings. Khmer architecture reflects the Hindu belief that the temple was built to recreate the abode of Hindu gods, Mount Meru, with its five peaks and surrounded by seas represented by ponds and moats. The early Khmer temples built in the Angkor region and the Bakong temple in Hariharalaya (Roluos) employed stepped pyramid structures to represent the sacred temple-mountain.

Khmer art and architecture reached their aesthetic and technical peak with the construction of the majestic temple Angkor Wat. Other temples are also constructed in the Angkor region, such as Ta Phrom and the Bayon. The construction of the temple demonstrates the artistic and technical achievements of Kambuja through its architectural mastery of stone masonry.

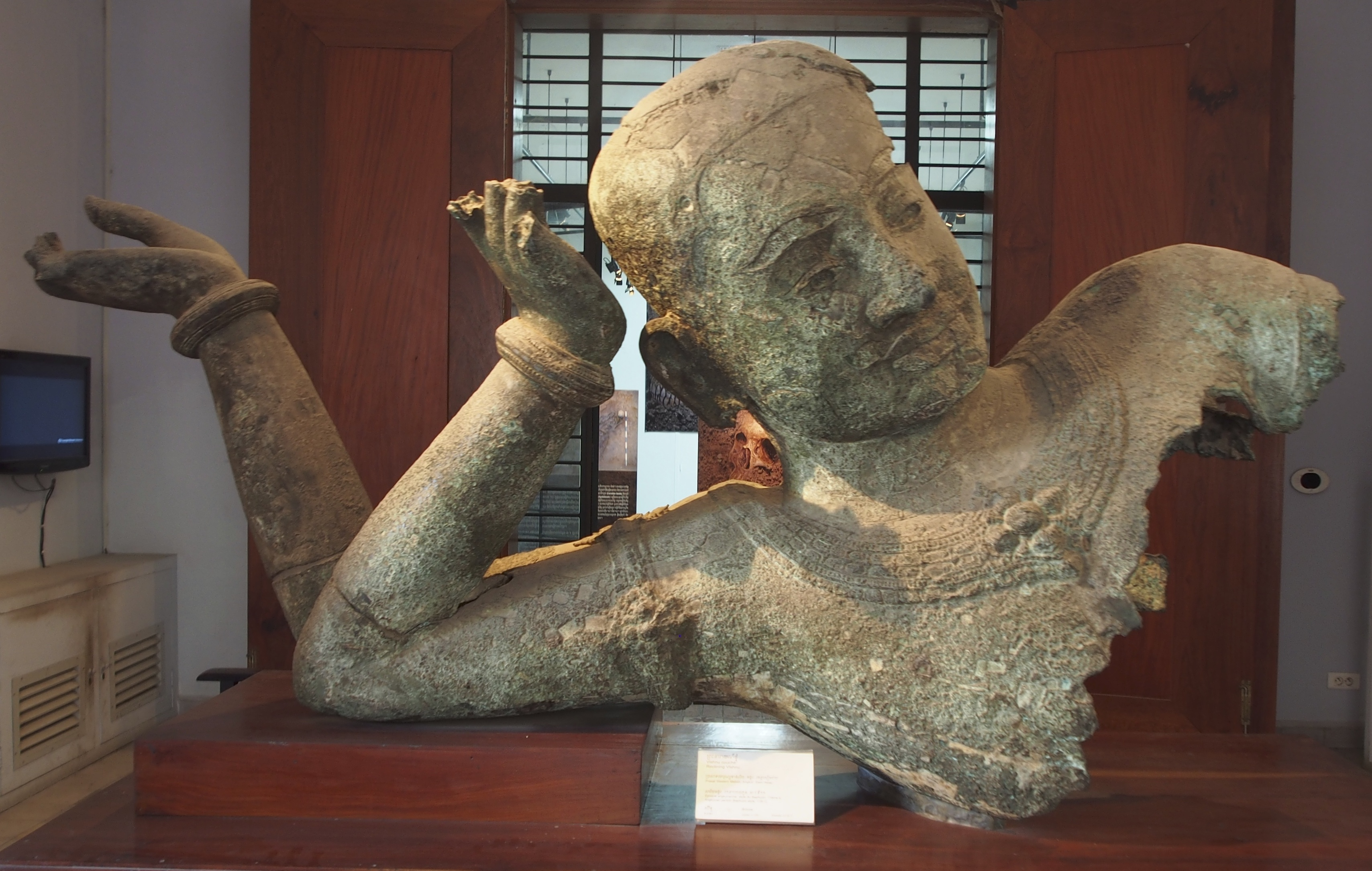
West Mebon Vishnu

Bronze is an alloy composed primarily of copper and tin. It was a preferred material for representing Hindu and Buddhist deities in Angkor and throughout the Khmer Empire. The Khmer regarded bronze as a noble substance, associated with prosperity and success, and it held cultural significance for many centuries. A bronze statue of Vishnu is considered the "Mona Lisa of Cambodia or the "Venus de Milo of Cambodia". It was discovered in 1936 by Frenchman Maurice Glaize in what was once the West Mebon temple on an island in Angkor's largest pond. The statue is estimated to have been made in the 11th century and would have been between 5-6 metres long.

List of architectural styles during Angkor period:

Styles	Dates	Rulers	Temples	Chief Characteristics
Kulen	825–875	Jayavarman II	Damrei Krap	Continuation of pre-Angkorean but a period of innovation and borrowing such as from Cham temples. Tower mainly square and relatively high. Mainly brick with laterite walls and stone door surrounds. Square and octagonal colonettes begin to appear.
Preah Ko	877–886	Jayavarman III Indravarman I	Preah Ko, Bakong, Lolei	Simple plan: one or more square brick towers on a single base. First appearance of concentric enclosures and of gopura and libraries. Decorative 'flying palaces' replaced by dvarapalas and devatas in niches. First major temple mountain at Bakong.
Bakheng	889–923	Yasovarman I Harshavarman I	Phnom Bakheng, Phnom Krom, Phnom Bok, Baksei Chamkrong (trans.)	Development of the temple mountain. More use of stone, particularly for major temples and more decorative stone carving.
Koh Ker	921–944	Jayavarman IV	Group of Koh Ker temples	Scale of buildings diminishes toward centre. Brick still main material but sandstone also used.
Pre Rup	944–968	Rajendravarman	Pre Rup, East Mebon, Bat Chum, Kutisvara	Transitional between Koh Ker and Banteay Srei. Long halls partly enclose sanctuary. The last great monuments in plastered brick, increasing use of sandstone.
Banteay Srei	967–1000	Jayavarman V	Banteay Srei	Ornate, superposed pediments, sweeping gable ends, rich and deep carving. Plasterd brick replaced by stone and laterite. Appearance of scenes in pediments. Voluptuous devatas with gentle expressions.
Khleang	968–1010	Jayavarman V	Ta Keo, The Khleangs, Phimeanakas, Royal Palace	First use of galleries. Cruciform gopuras. Octagonal colonettes. Restrained decorative carving.
Baphuon	1050–1080	Udayadityavarman II	Baphuon, West Mebon	A return to rich carving: floral motifs but also lintels with scenes. Nagas without head-dress. Bas-reliefs appear at Baphuon temple, carving with lively scenes enclosed in small panels, often in narrative sequence.
Angkor Wat	1113–1175	Suryavarman II Yasovarman II	Angkor Wat, Banteay Samré, Thommanon, Chau Say Tevoda, Beng Mealea, some of Preah Pithu, Phimai and Phnom Rung	The high classical style of Khmer architecture. Fully developed conical towers with carving profile. Galleries wider and with half galleries on one side. Concentric enclosures connected by axial galleries. Nagas with head-dress, naga balustrades raised off the ground. Invention of cross-shaped terrace. Richly carved lintels and other decorations. Bas-reliefs, Apsaras.
Bayon	1181–1243	Jayavarman VII Indravarman II	Ta Prohm, Preah Khan, Neak Pean, Ta Som, Ta Nei, Angkor Thom, Prasat Chrung, Bayon, Elephant terrace, Ta Prohm Kel, Krol Ko, Prasat Suor Prat, Banteay Chhmar, Hospital Chaples, Jayatataka baray	The last great style. Hurried construction, often in laterite not stone, carving less elegant. Complex plans, huge temples. In Cambodia, face-towers and historical narrative bas-reliefs. Three periods: 1. large complex temples on a single level, 2. face-towers and avenues of giants carrying nagas, 3. decline of the building standards, devatas acquire Angkor Wat style diadem.
Post Bayon	1243–15th c.	Jayavarman VIII and others	Terrace of the Leper King, Preah Pithu, Preah Palilay (modifications to temples)	Inversion of cross-shaped terrace, causeways on columns, low or high.

== Relations with regional powers ==
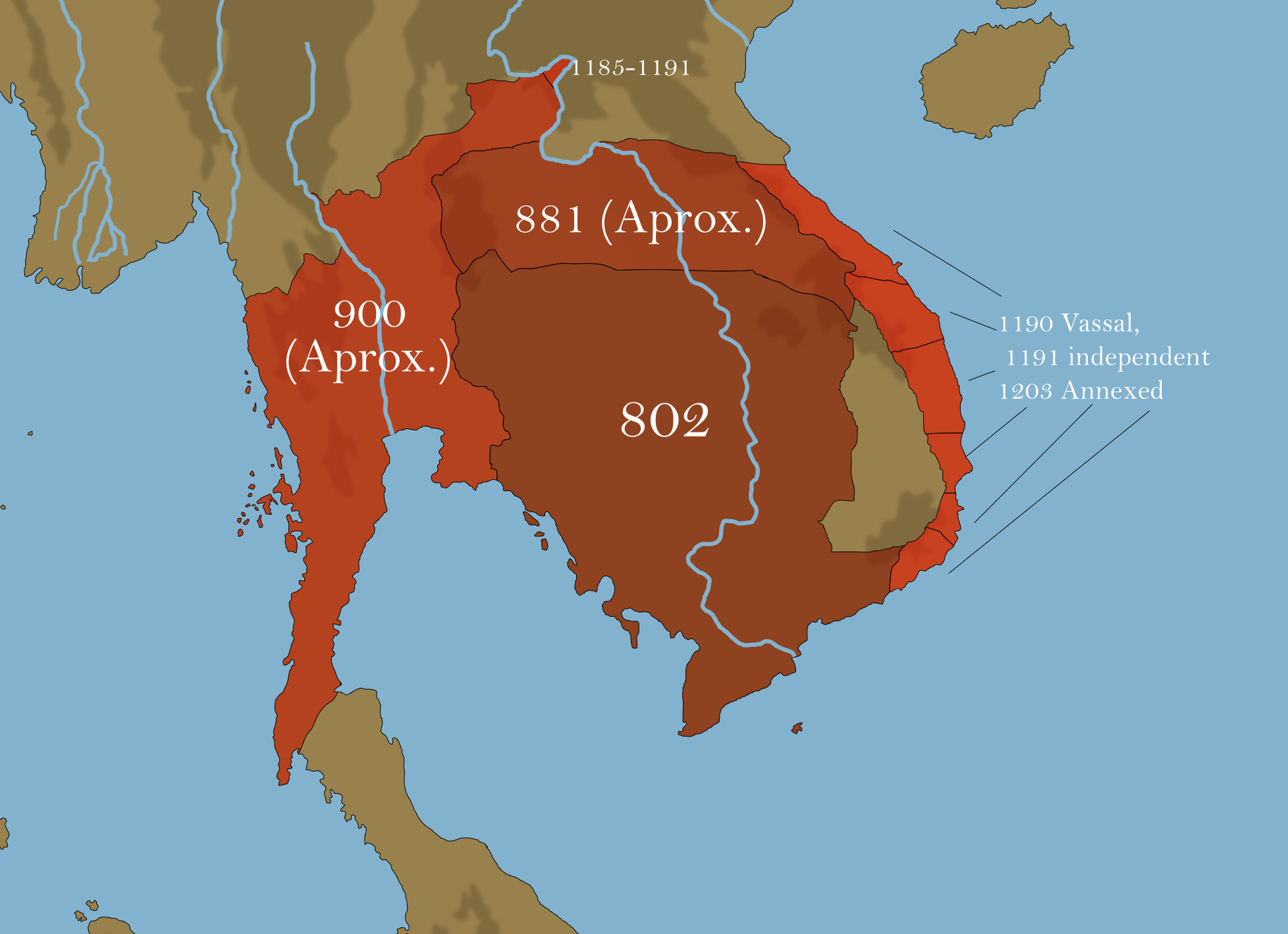
Expansion of Kambuja into the kingdoms of Lavo and Champa

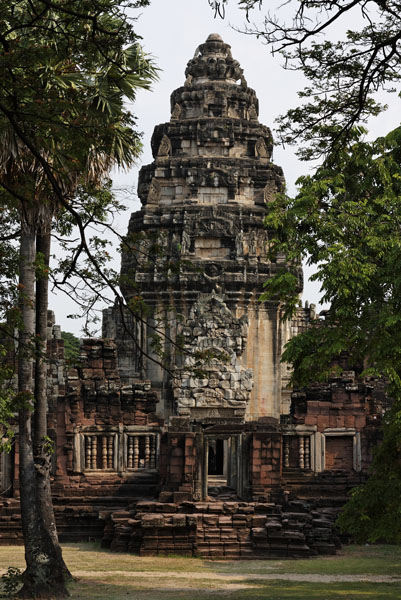
Phimai, the site of the ancient Khmer city of Vimayapura

During the formation of the empire, the Khmer had close cultural, political, and trade relations with Java and with the Srivijaya Empire that lay beyond Khmer's southern seas. In 851 a Persian merchant named Sulaiman al-Tajir recorded an incident involving a Khmer king and a Maharaja of Zabaj. He described the story of a Khmer king who defied the power of Maharaja of Zabaj. It was said that the Javanese Sailendras staged a surprise attack on the Khmers by approaching the capital from the river. The young king was later punished by the Maharaja, and subsequently the kingdom became a vassal of the Sailendra dynasty.

Zabaj is the Arabic form of Javaka and might refer to Java or Srivijaya. The legend probably describes the predecessor or initial stage of the Kambuja under Javanese dominion. The Legend of the Maharaja of Zabaj was later published by the historian Masoudi in his 947 CE book, "Meadows of Gold and Mines of Gems." The Kaladi inscription of Java (c. 909) mentioned Kmir (Khmer people or Cambodian) together with Campa (Champa) and Rman (Mon) as foreigners from mainland Southeast Asia who frequently came to Java to trade. The inscription suggests a maritime trade network had been established between Kambuja and Java (Mdang kingdom).

In 916 CE, Arab historian Abu Zayd al-Sirafi recorded in a lengthy chronicle that the young, inexperienced king of Khmer, is hostile to Java. When the hostility becomes state policy and is known publicly, the king of Java attacked and captured the Khmer king. He was beheaded and the head brought to Java. The king of Java ordered the minister of Khmer Empire to seek the successor. After being cleaned and embalmed, the head of the king was put in a vase and sent to the new Khmer king.

Throughout its history, the empire also was involved in series of wars and rivalries with the neighbouring kingdoms of Champa, Tambralinga, and Đại Việt – and later in its history with Siamese Sukhothai and Ayutthaya. The Khmer Empire's relations with its eastern neighbour Champa was exceptionally intense, as both sides struggled for domination in the region. The Cham fleet raided Angkor in 1177, and in 1203 the Khmer managed to push back and defeat Champa.

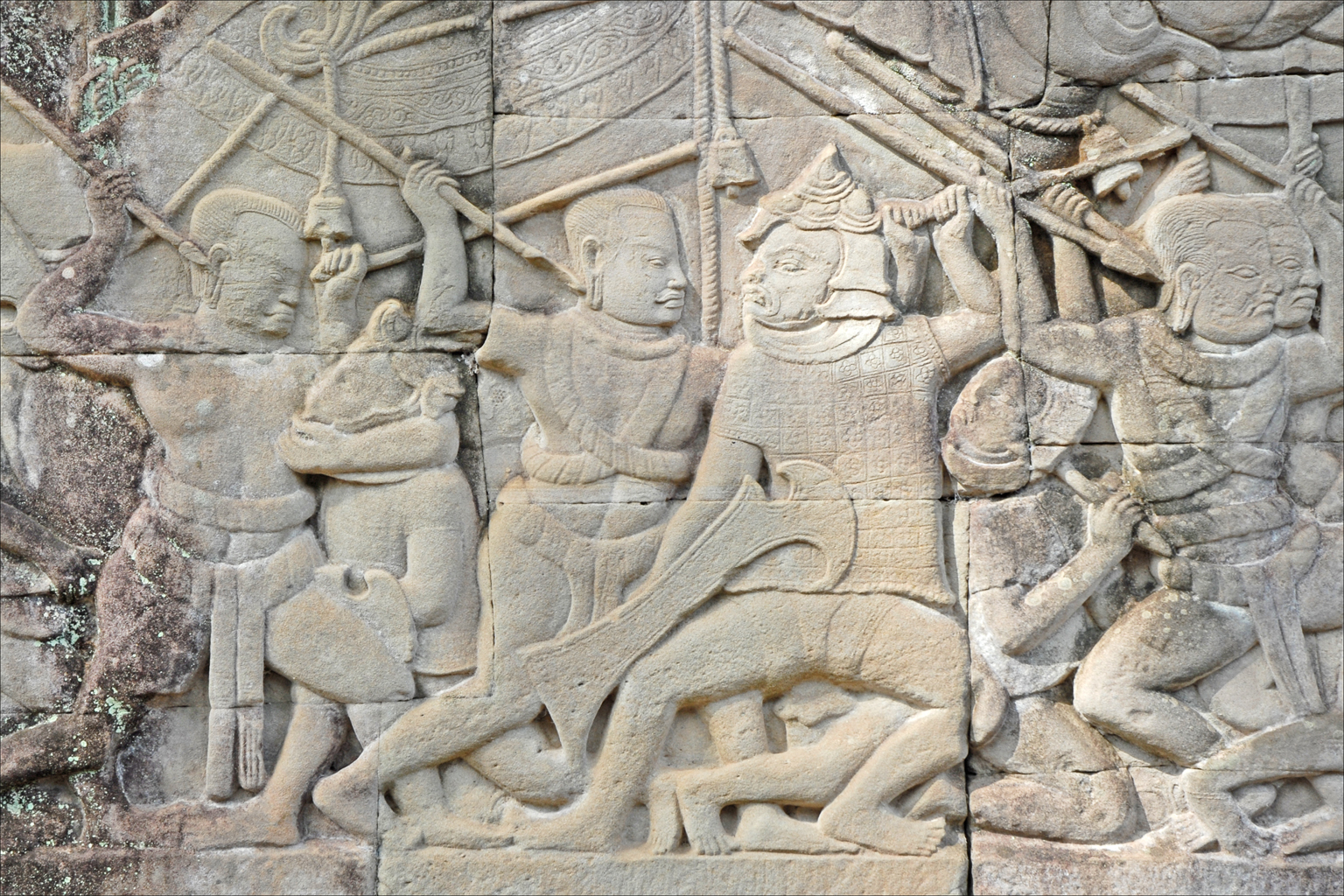
A Khmer soldier (left) fights against his Cham rival (right). The bas-reliefs of the Bayon, always depict the Chams as wearing helmets in the shape of a Magnolia champaca flower.

Arab writers of the 9th and 10th century hardly mention the region for anything other than its perceived backwardness, but they considered the king of Al-Hind (India and Southeast Asia) one of the four great kings in the world. The ruler of the Rashtrakuta Dynasty is described as the greatest king of Al-Hind, but even the lesser kings of Al-Hind including the kings of Java, Pagan Burma, and the Khmer kings of Cambodia are invariably depicted by the Arabs as extremely powerful and as being equipped with vast armies of men, horses, and often tens of thousands of elephants. They were also known to have been in possession of vast treasures of gold and silver. The Khmer rulers established relations with the Chola dynasty of South India.

The Khmer Empire seems to have maintained contact with Chinese dynasties; spanning from the late Tang period to the Yuan period. The relations with the Yuan dynasty was of great historical significance, since it produced The Customs of Cambodia (真臘風土記), an important insight into the Khmer Empire's daily life, culture and society. The report was written between 1296 and 1297 by the Yuan diplomat Zhou Daguan, sent by Temür Khan of Yuan dynasty to stay in Angkor.

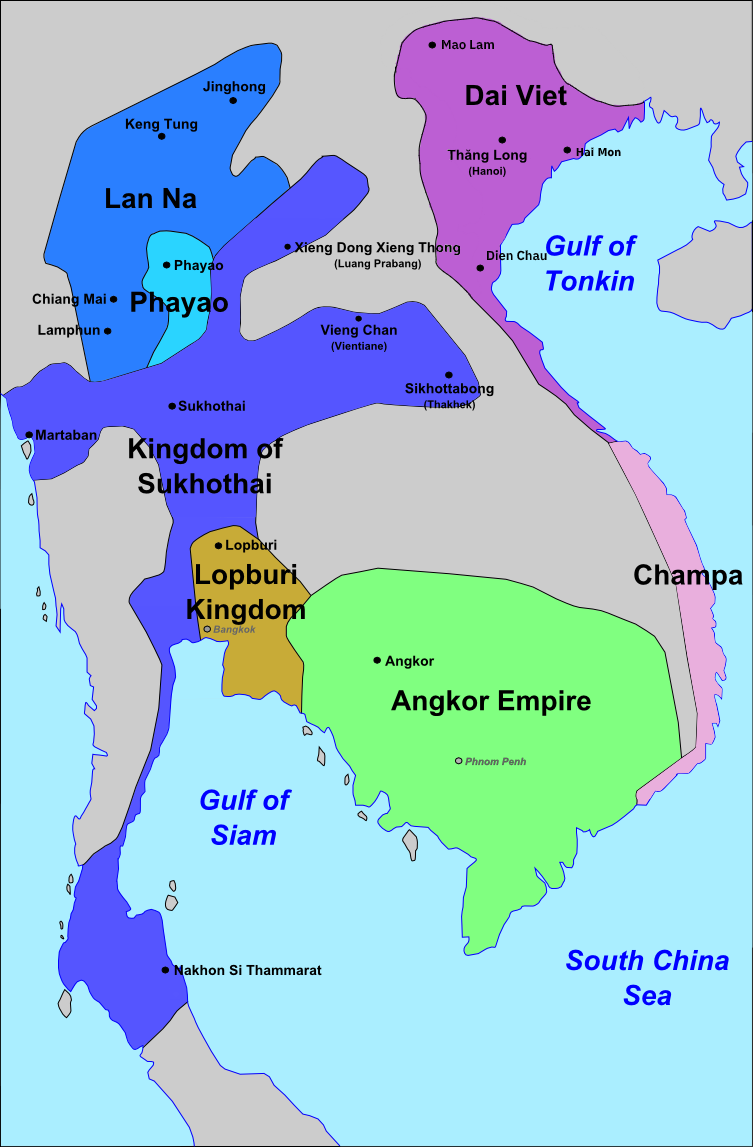
Mainland Southeast Asia at the end of the 13th century

Beginning in the 13th century, Khmer's relations with the Siamese were difficult and bitter, resulting in rivalry and hostility for centuries. In August 1296, Zhou Daguan recorded that in the recent war with the Siamese, the country was utterly devastated. This report confirmed that by the late 13th century, the Siamese warlords had revolted and disrupted the Khmer empire's hegemony, starting Siam's rise. By the 14th century, the Siamese Ayutthaya Kingdom became the Khmer empire's formidable rival, as Angkor was besieged and captured twice by Ayutthayan Siamese invaders in 1353 and 1394. Being the successor to the former Khmer dependency of Lavo (Lopburi), Ayutthaya also inherited traditions of Khmer prestige and statecraft. Unlike earlier Tai polities that had a relatively flat hierarchy, Ayutthaya adopted Angkor's more complex social stratification, the deification of kings (Devaraja) as well as Khmer honorifics and elaborate Brahmanic rituals. Specialist staff in early Ayutthaya, like scribes, court Brahmans, jurists, chamberlains, accountants, physicians and astrologers, usually came from the Khmer-speaking elites of city-states in the eastern Chaophraya Basin that had been under the influence of the Khmer Empire.

In the 1300s, the Lao prince Fa Ngum was exiled to live in the royal court of Angkor. His father-in-law, the King of Cambodia, gave him a Khmer army to create a buffer state in what is now Laos. Fa Ngum conquered local principalities and established the Kingdom of Lan Xang. With the assistance of Khmer scholars, Fa Ngum introduced Theravada Buddhism and the culture of the Khmer Empire to the region.

A Javanese source, the Nagarakretagama canto 15, composed in 1365 in the Majapahit Empire, claimed Java had established diplomatic relations with Kambuja (Cambodia) together with Syangkayodhyapura (Ayutthaya), Dharmmanagari (Negara Sri Dharmaraja), Rajapura (Ratchaburi) and Singhanagari (Songkla), Marutma (Martaban or Mottama, Southern Myanmar), Champa, and Yawana (Annam). This record describes the political situations in Mainland Southeast Asia in the mid-14th century; although the Cambodian polity still survived, the rise of Siamese Ayutthaya had taken its toll. Finally, the empire fell, marked by the abandonment of Angkor for Phnom Penh in 1431, caused by Siamese pressure.

The empire's own contacts with China ended earlier than those of the polities to its west. Walailak Songsiri gives Cambodia's last recorded mission to the Song court as 1135, against 1155 for Lavo and 1200 to 1205 for Chen Li Fu. She also reads the Khmer style kamrateng, taken up from the Khorat Plateau and the Tonlé Sap, as a court usage adopted for formal address to the Chinese court rather than a mark of subordination, noting that Chinese records give it to the rulers of Sukhothai, Phrip Phri and Chen Li Fu alike, while the sixty and more settlements dependent on Chen Li Fu had rulers of their own who did not bear it.

== List of rulers ==
Reign	King	Capital	Information and events
802–835	Jayavarman II	Mahendraparvata, Hariharalaya	Proclaimed the independence of Kambuja from Java. Claimed as Chakravartin through sacred Hindu ritual on Phnom Kulen and initiating Devaraja cult in Cambodia.
835–877	Jayavarman III	Hariharalaya	Son of Jayavarman II
877–889	Indravarman I	Hariharalaya	Nephew of Jayavarman II. Built Preah Ko dedicated to Jayavarman II, also for his father and his grand father. Constructed temple mountain Bakong.
889–910	Yasovarman I	Hariharalaya, Yasodharapura	Son of Indravarman I. Built Indratataka Baray and Lolei. Moved the capital to Yasodharapura centred around Phnom Bakheng, and also built Yashodharatataka.
910–923	Harshavarman I	Yasodharapura	Son of Yasovarman I. Involved in a power struggle against his maternal uncle Jayavarman IV. Built Baksei Chamkrong.
923–928	Ishanavarman II	Yasodharapura	Son of Yasovarman I, brother of Harshavarman I. Involved in a power struggle against his maternal uncle Jayavarman IV. Built Prasat Kravan.
928–941	Jayavarman IV	Koh Ker (Lingapura)	Son of King Indravarman I's daughter, Mahendradevi, married to Yasovarman I sister, claim the throne through maternal line. Ruled from Koh Ker.
941–944	Harshavarman II	Koh Ker (Lingapura)	Son of Jayavarman IV.
944–968	Rajendravarman II	Angkor (Yasodharapura)	Uncle and first cousin of Harshavarman II and wrestle power from him. Transfer the capital back to Angkor, Built Pre Rup and East Mebon. War against Champa in 946.
968–1001	Jayavarman V	Angkor (Jayendranagari)	Son of Rajendravarman II. Built a new capital Jayendranagari and Ta Keo in its centre.
1001–1006	Udayadityavarman I, Jayaviravarman, Suryavarman I	Angkor	Period of chaos, three kings rule simultaneously as antagonist.
1006–1050	Suryavarman I	Angkor	Took the throne. Alliance with Chola and conflict with Tambralinga kingdom. Built Preah Khan Kompong Svay. The king adhered to Mahayana Buddhism.
1050–1066	Udayadityavarman II	Angkor (Yasodharapura)	Took the throne, descendant of Yasovarman I's spouse. Built Baphuon, West Baray and West Mebon, also Sdok Kok Thom.
1066–1080	Harshavarman III	Angkor (Yasodharapura)	Succeeded his elder brother Udayadityavarman II, capital at Baphuon. Champa invasion in 1074 and 1080.
1090–1107	Jayavarman VI	Angkor	Usurper from Vimayapura. Built Phimai.
1107–1113	Dharanindravarman I	Angkor	Succeeded his younger brother, Jayavarman VI.
1113–1145	Suryavarman II	Angkor	Usurped and killed his great uncle. Built Angkor Wat, Banteay Samre, Thommanon, Chau Say Tevoda and Beng Mealea. Invade Đại Việt and Champa.
1150–1160	Dharanindravarman II	Angkor	Succeeded his cousin Suryavarman II
1160–1167	Yasovarman II	Angkor	Overthrown by his minister Tribhuvanadityavarman
1167–1177	Tribhuvanadityavarman	Angkor	Cham invasion in 1177 and 1178 led by Jaya Indravarman IV, looted the Khmer capital.
1178–1181	Cham occupation, led by Champa king Jaya Indravarman IV		
1181–1218	Jayavarman VII	Angkor (Yasodharapura)	Led Khmer army against Cham invaders thus liberated Cambodia. Led the conquest of Champa (1190–1191). Major infrastructure constructions; built hospitals, rest houses, reservoirs, and temples including Ta Prohm, Preah Khan, the Bayon in Angkor Thom city, and Neak Pean.
1219–1243	Indravarman II	Angkor	Son of Jayavarman VII. Champa passed out of Khmer control in his reign, and the towns of the upper Chao Phraya basin came under the rulers who founded the Sukhothai Kingdom; how far Angkorian authority had reached into those towns is disputed.
1243–1295	Jayavarman VIII	Angkor	Mongol invasion led by Kublai Khan in 1283 and war with Sukhothai. Built Mangalartha. He was a zealous Shivaite and eradicated Buddhist influences.
1295–1308	Indravarman III	Angkor	Overthrew his father in law Jayavarman VIII. Made Theravada Buddhism the state religion. Received Yuan Chinese diplomat Zhou Daguan (1296–1297).
1308–1327	Indrajayavarman	Angkor	
1327–1336	Jayavarman IX	Angkor	Last Sanskrit inscription (1327).
1336–1340	Trasak Paem	Angkor	
1340–1346	Nippean Bat	Angkor	
1346–1347	Sithean Reachea	Angkor	
1347–1352	Lompong Reachea	Angkor	
1352–1357	Siamese Ayutthaya invasion led by Uthong		
1357–1363	Soryavong	Angkor	
1363–1373	Borom Reachea I	Angkor	
1373–1393	Thomma Saok	Angkor	
1393	Siamese Ayutthaya invasion led by Ramesuan		
1394–c. 1421	In Reachea	Angkor	
1405–1431	Barom Reachea II	Angkor, Chaktomuk	Abandoned Angkor (1431).

== Gallery of temples ==
Angkor-period temples in Cambodia

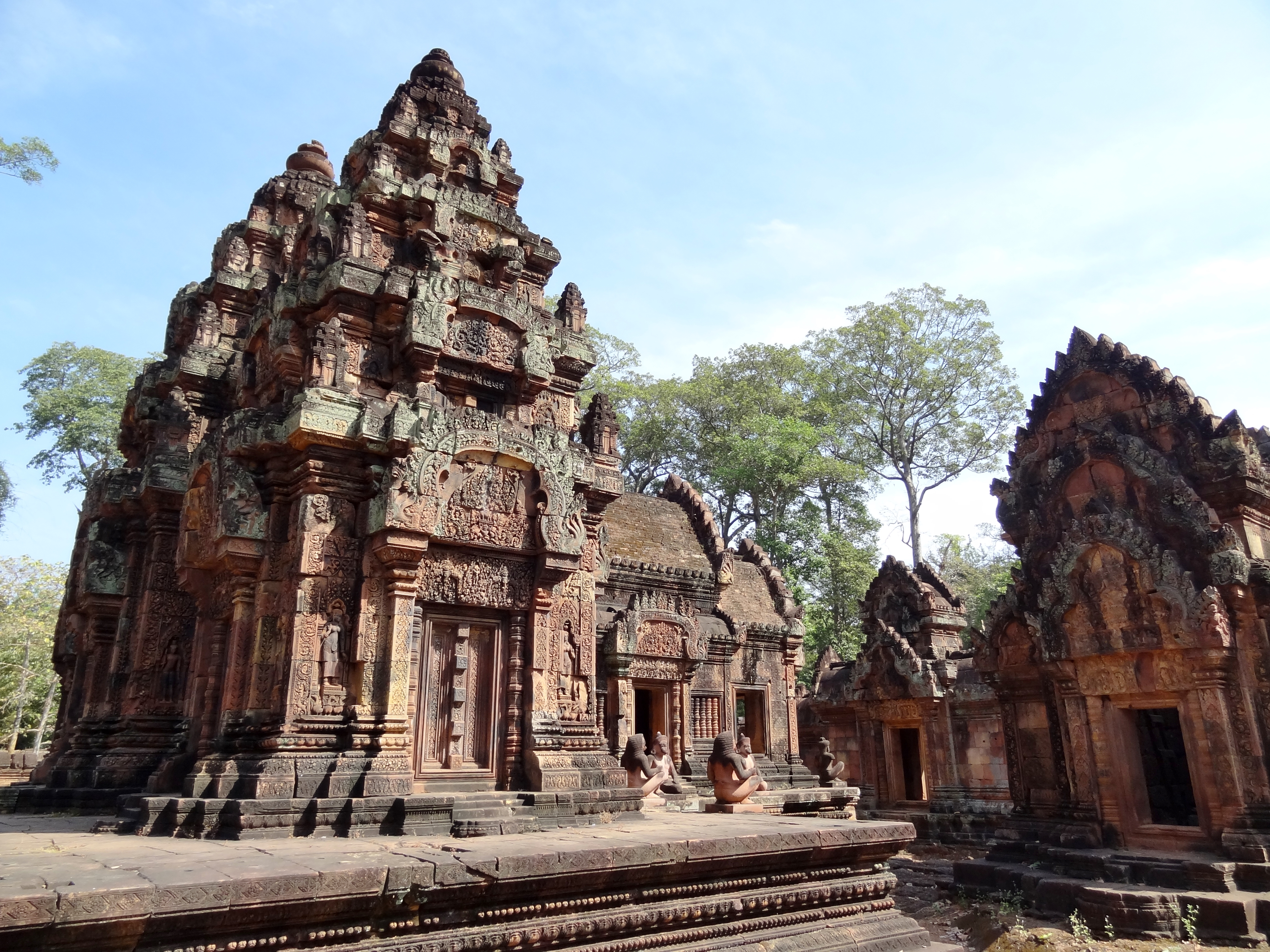
Banteay Srei

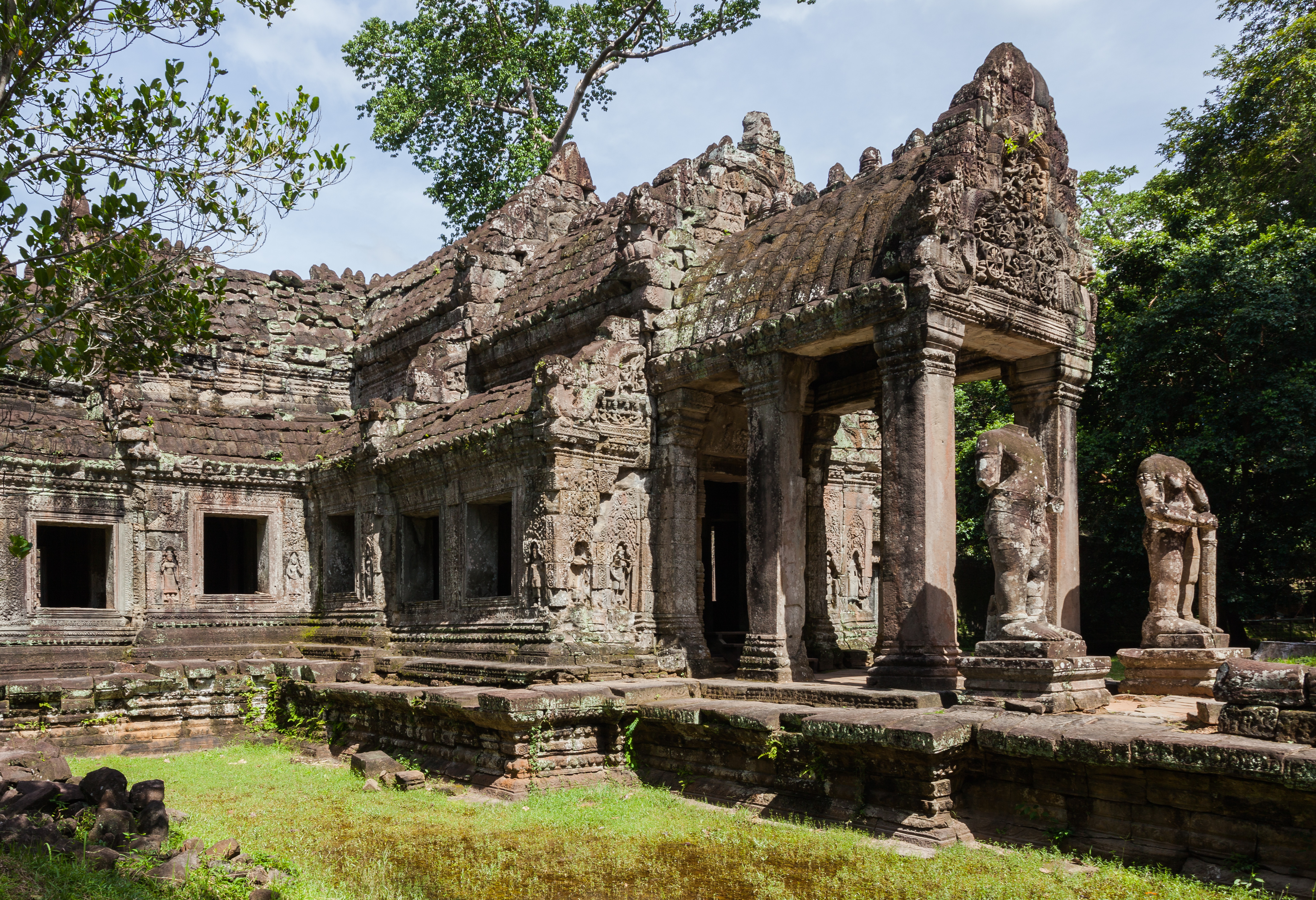
Preah Khan

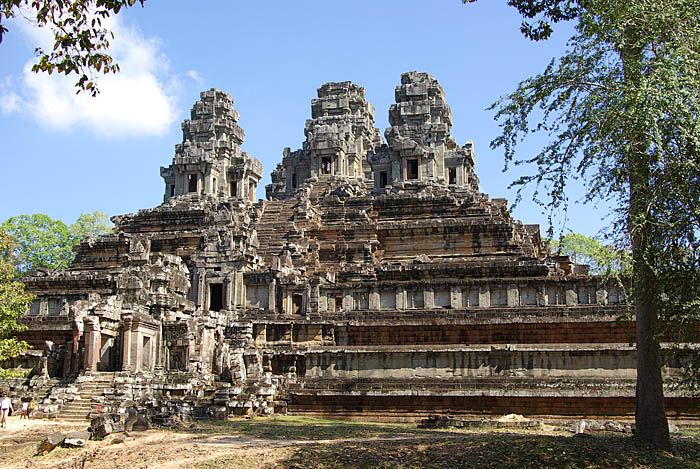
Ta Keo

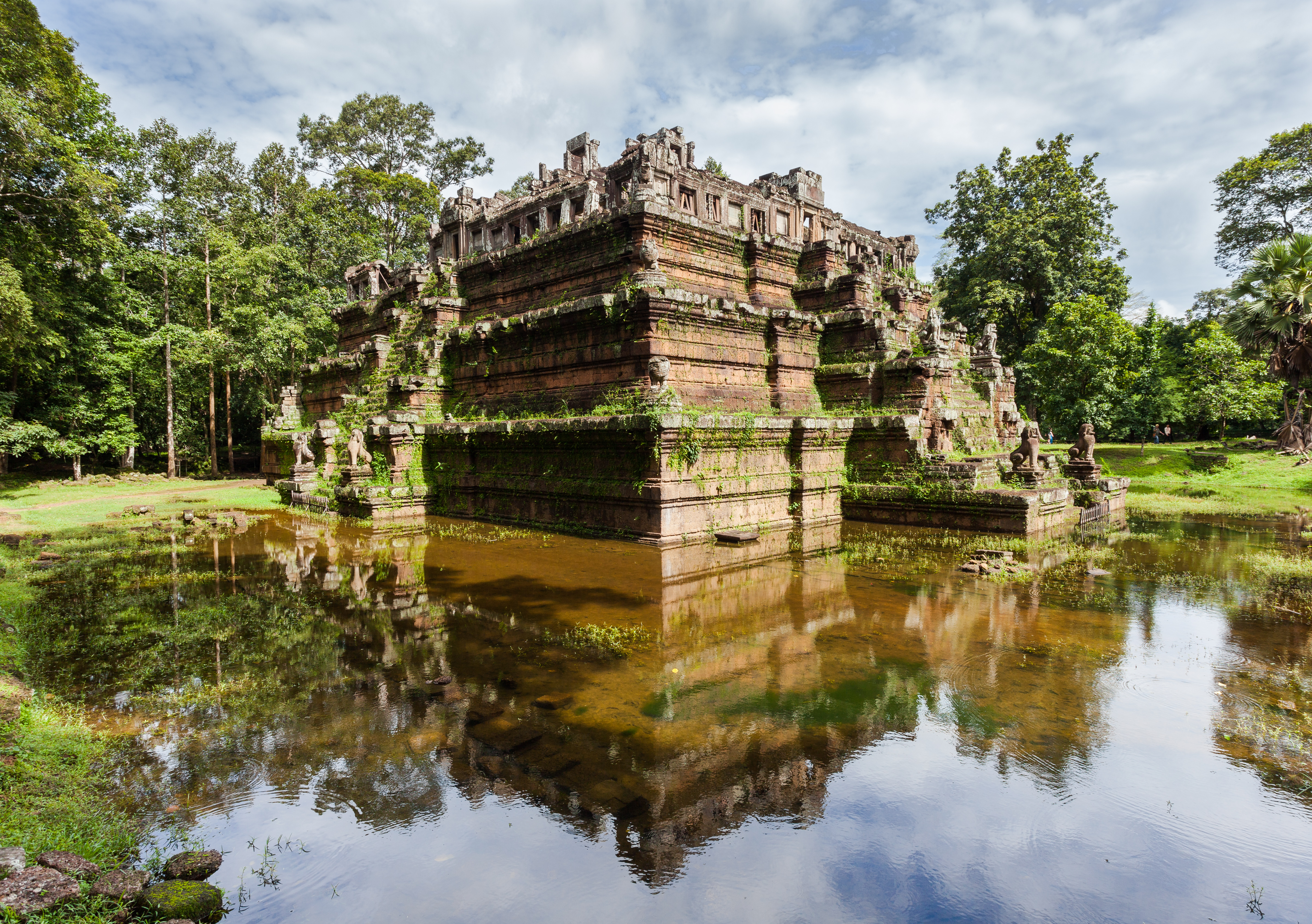
Phimeanakas

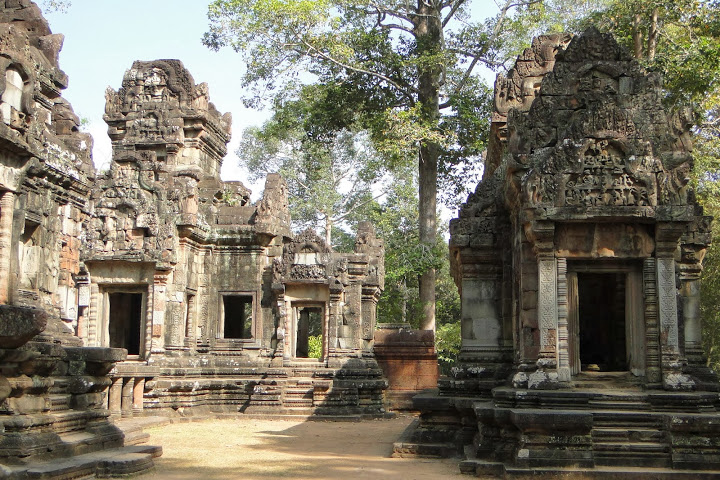
Chau Say Tevoda

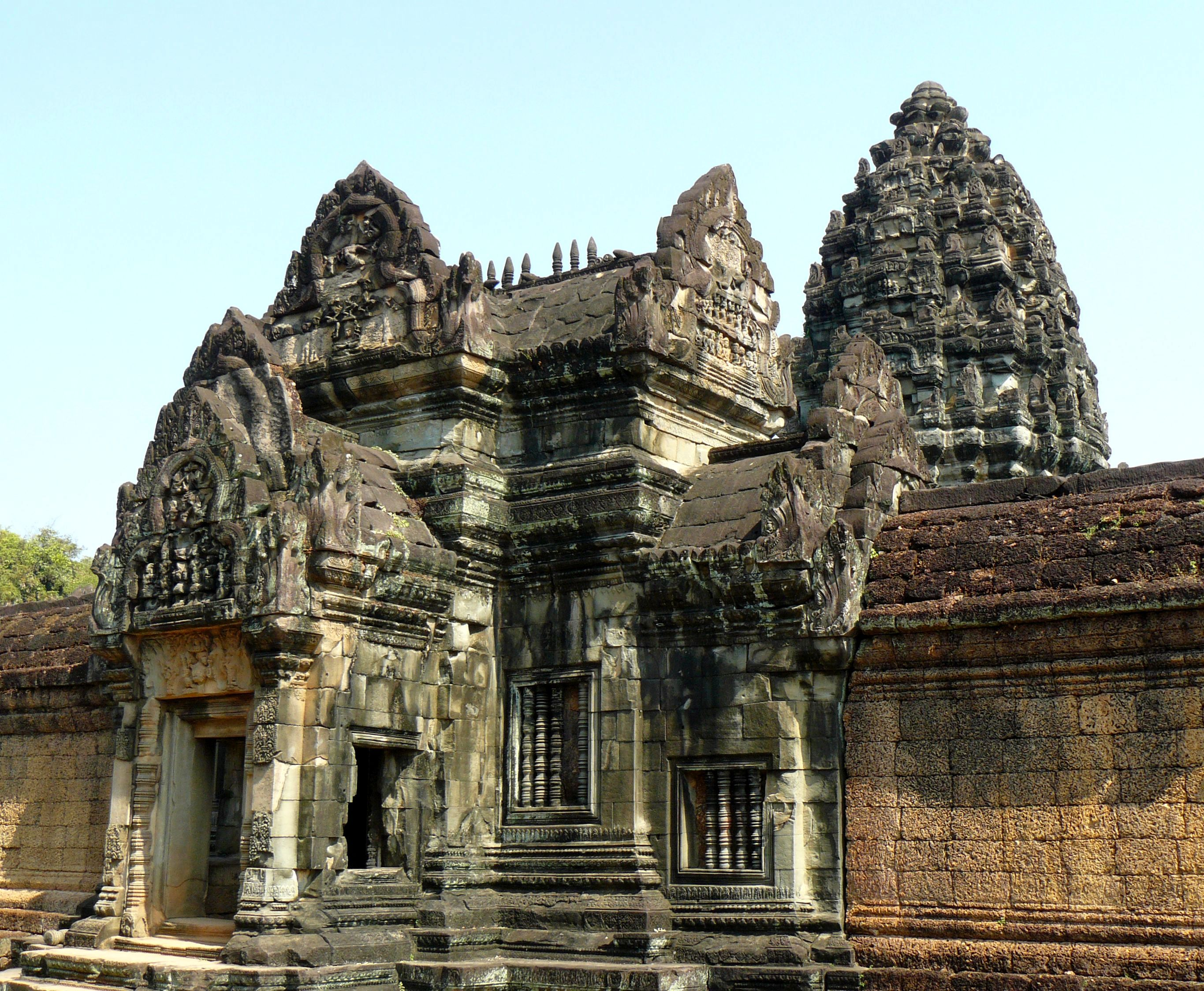
Banteay Samré

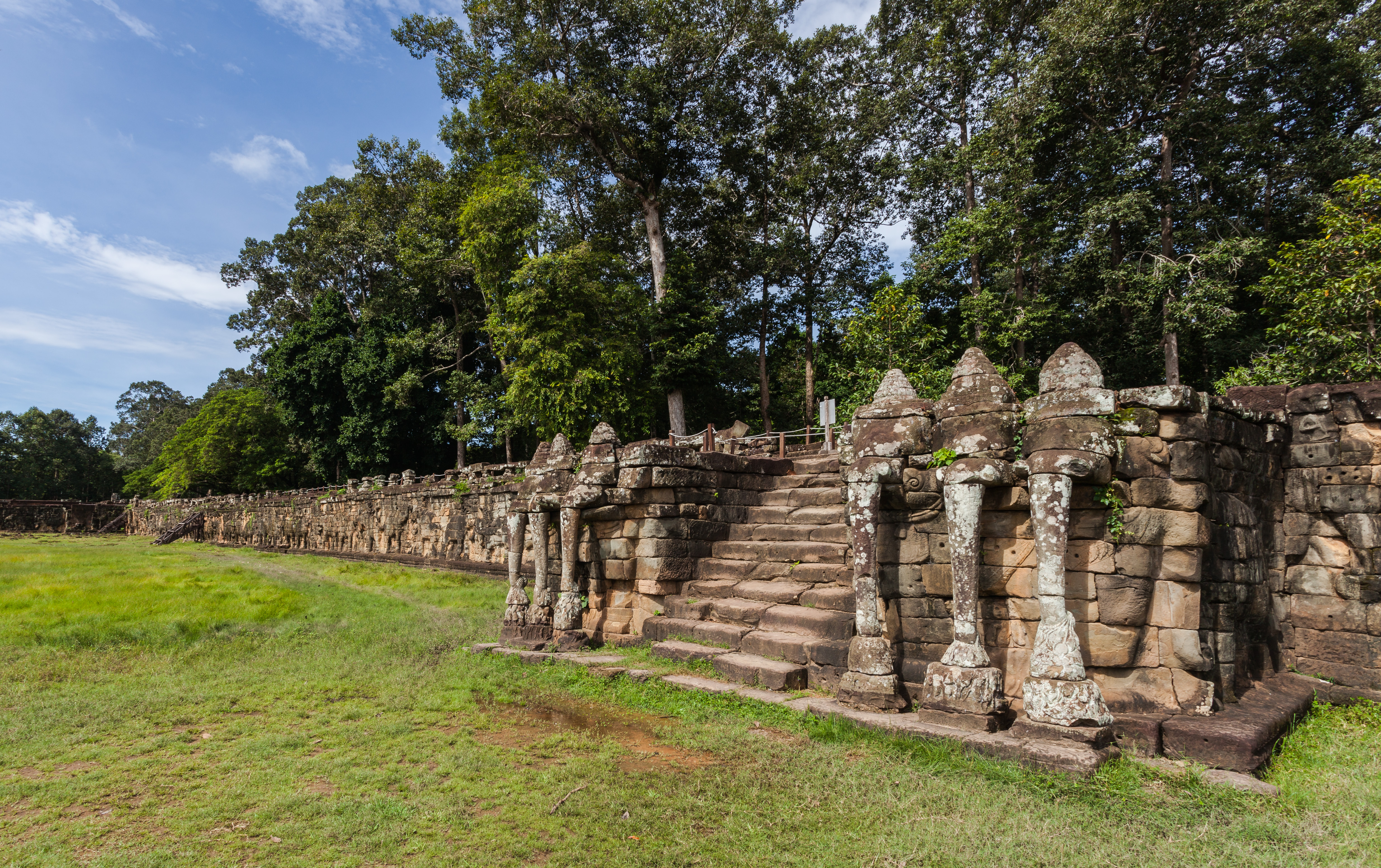
Terrace of the Elephants
Angkor-period temples in Thailand

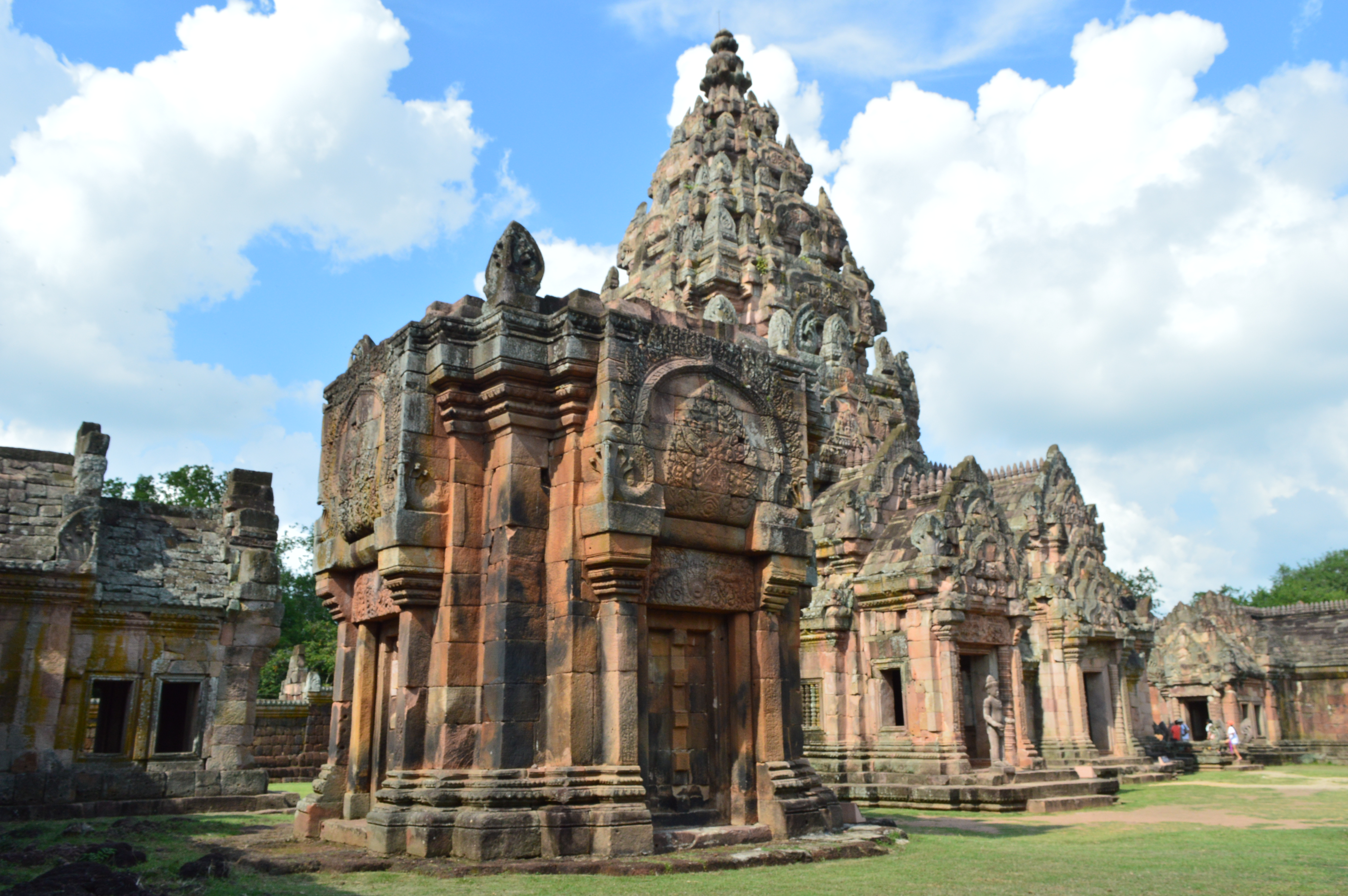
Phanom Rung

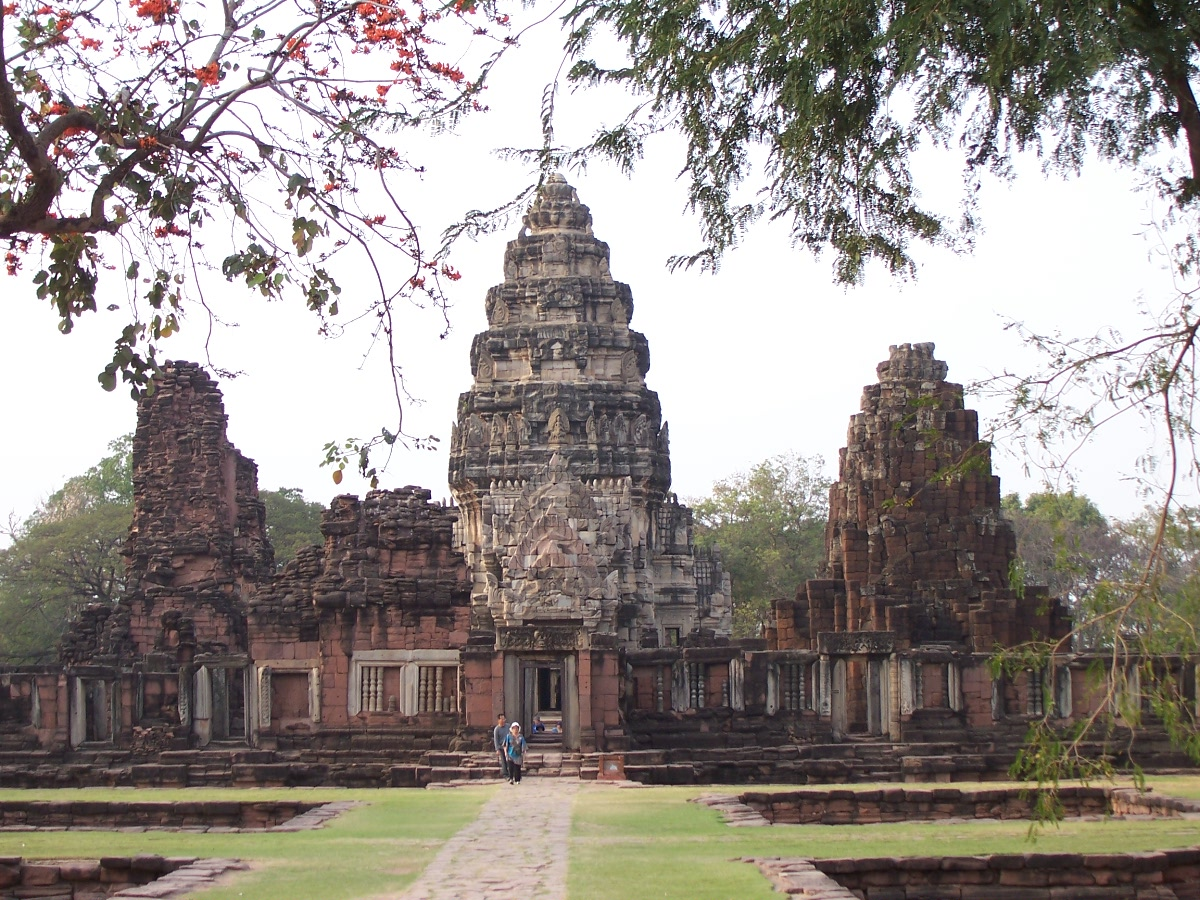
Prasat Phimai

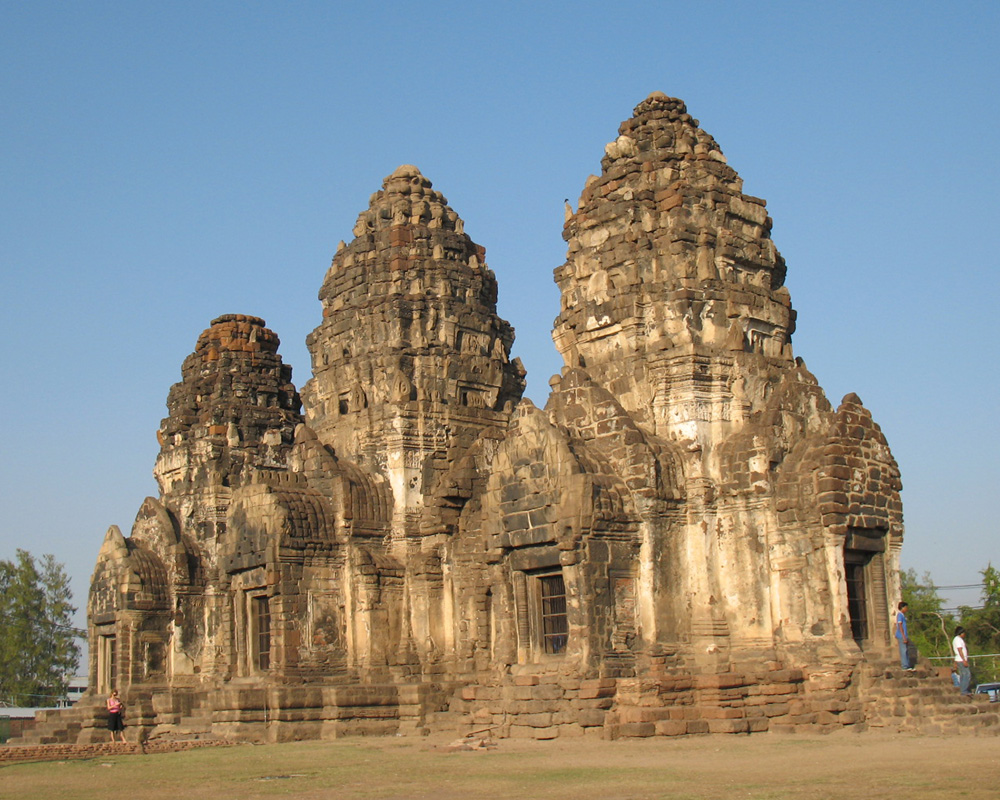
Prang Sam Yot

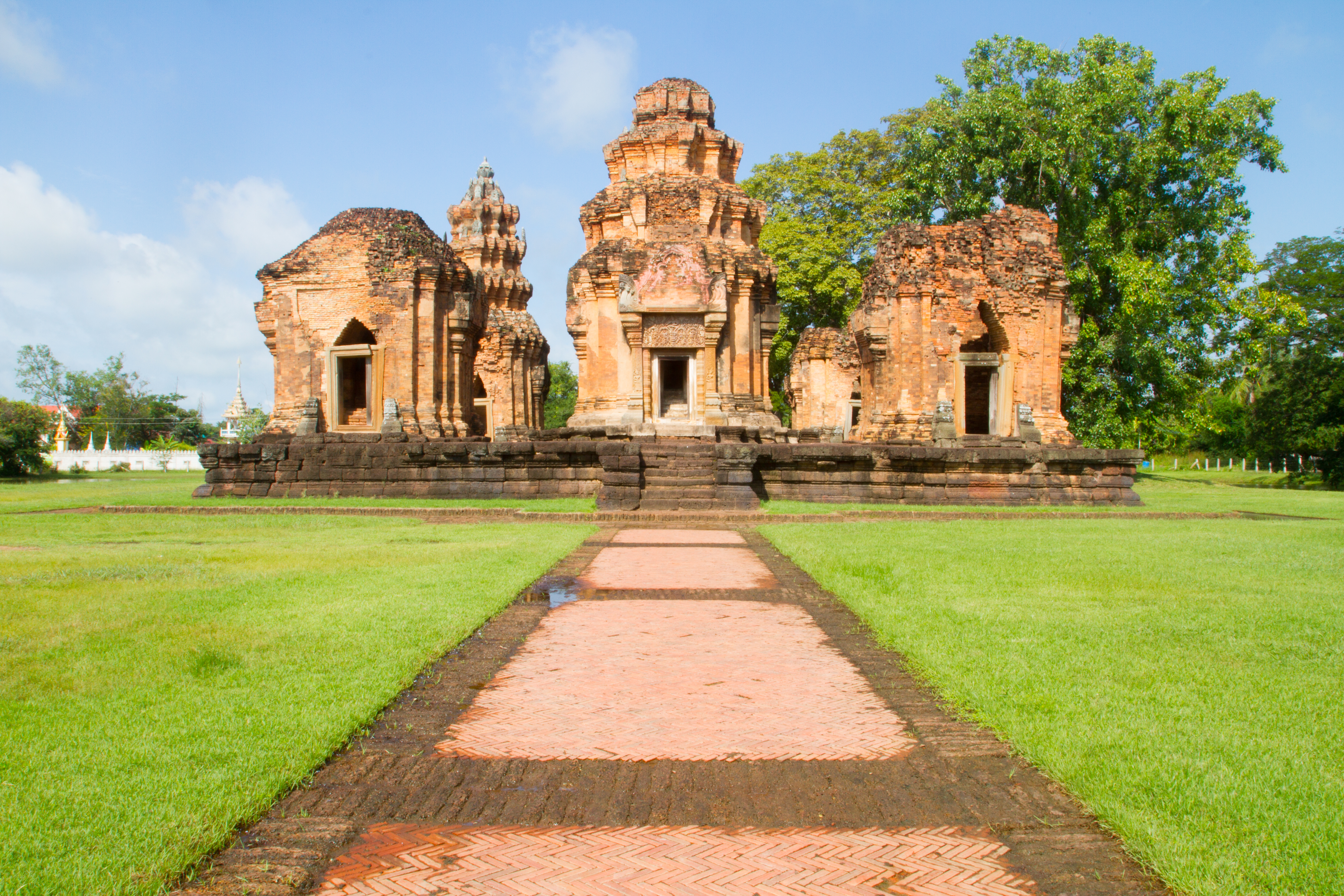
Prasat Sikhoraphum

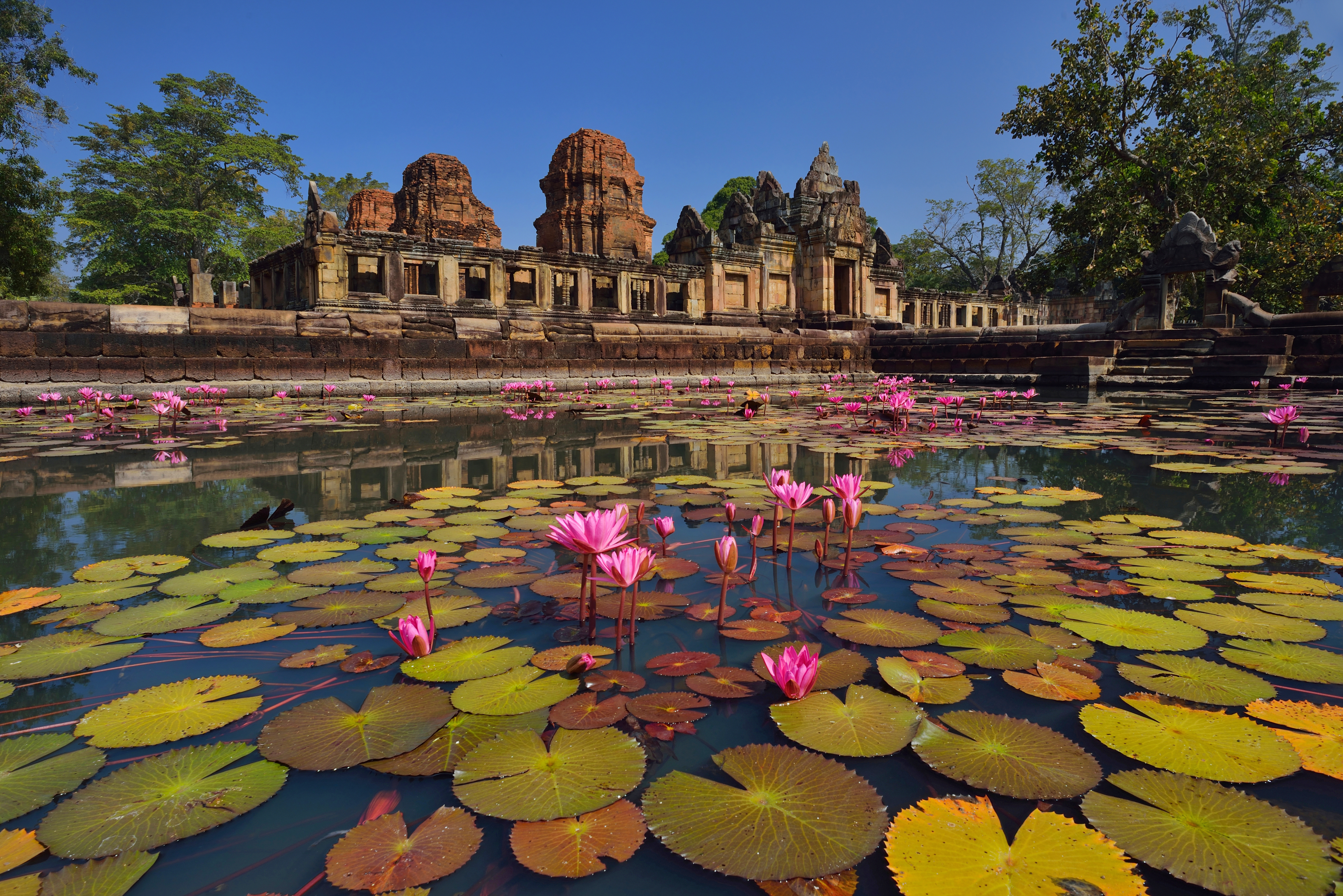
Prasat Muang Tam

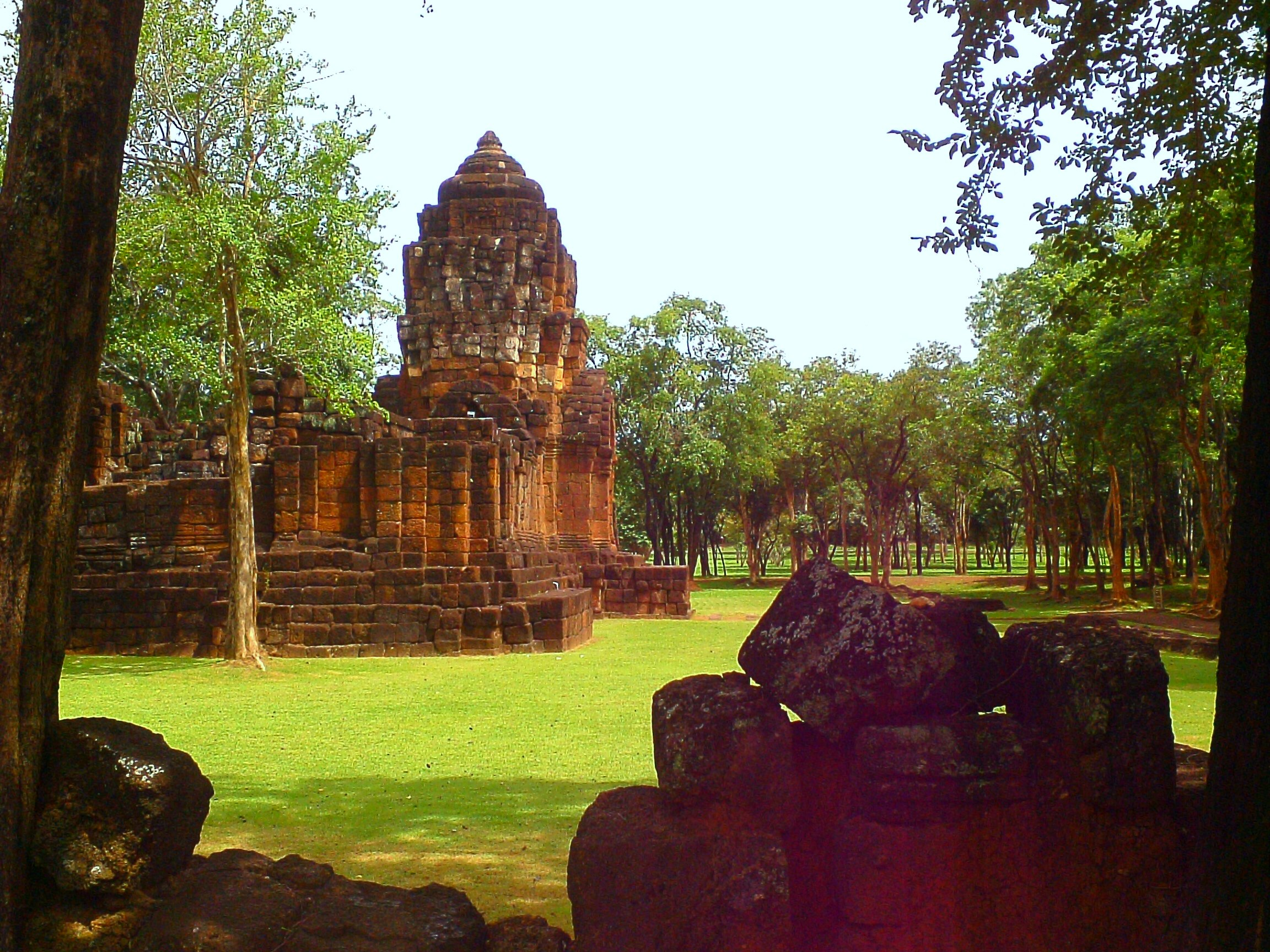
Prasat Muang Singh

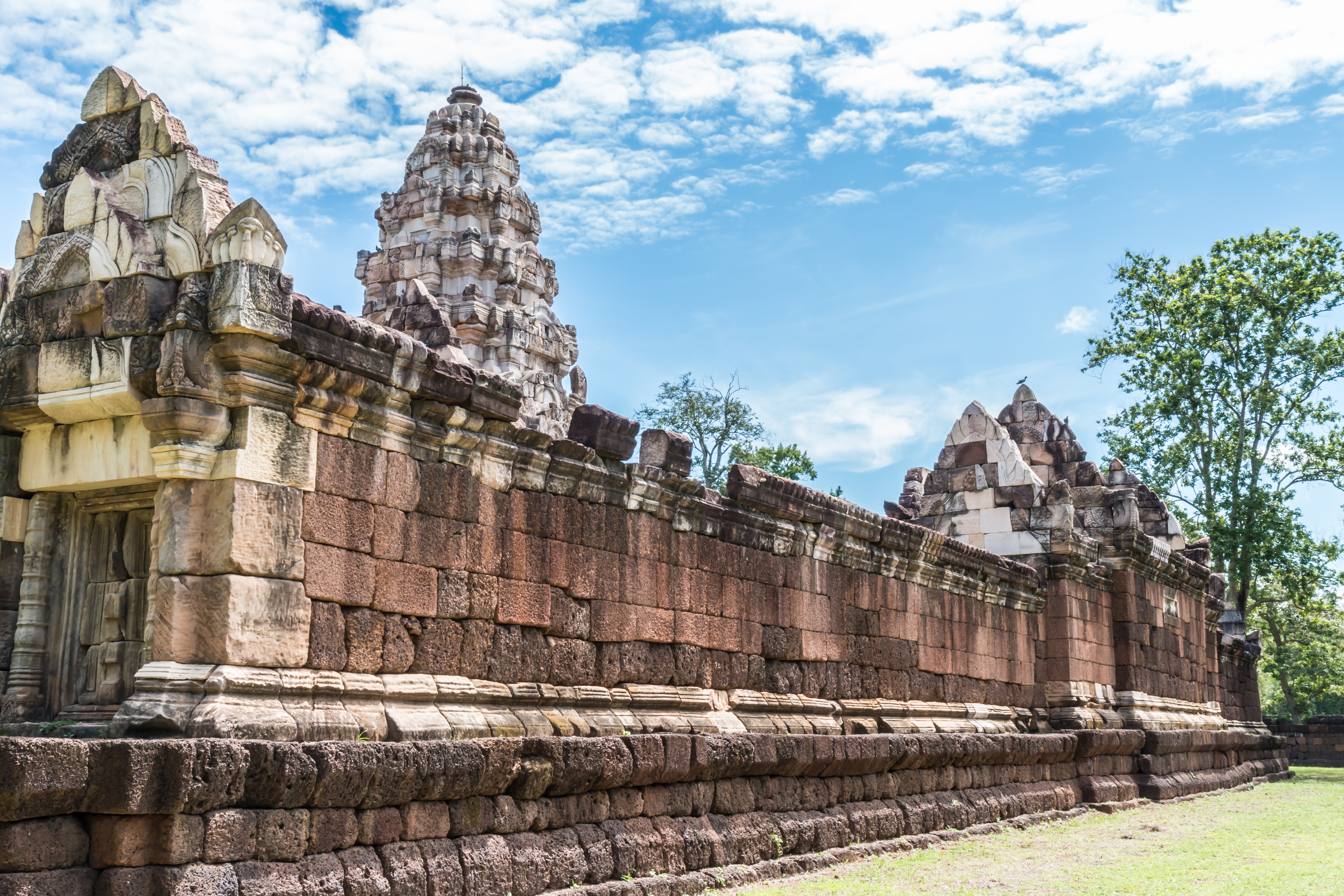
Sdok Kok Thom
Angkor-period temples in Laos

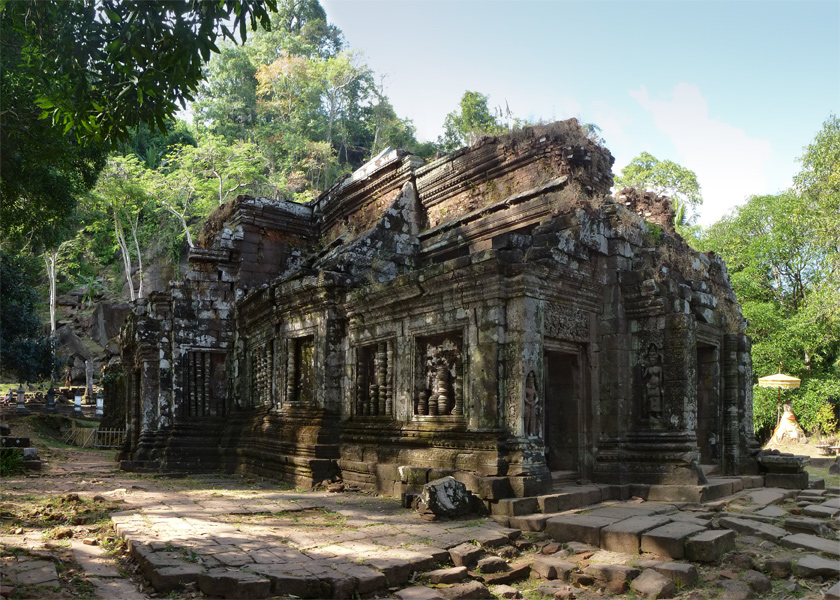
Vat Phou
Angkor-period temples in Vietnam

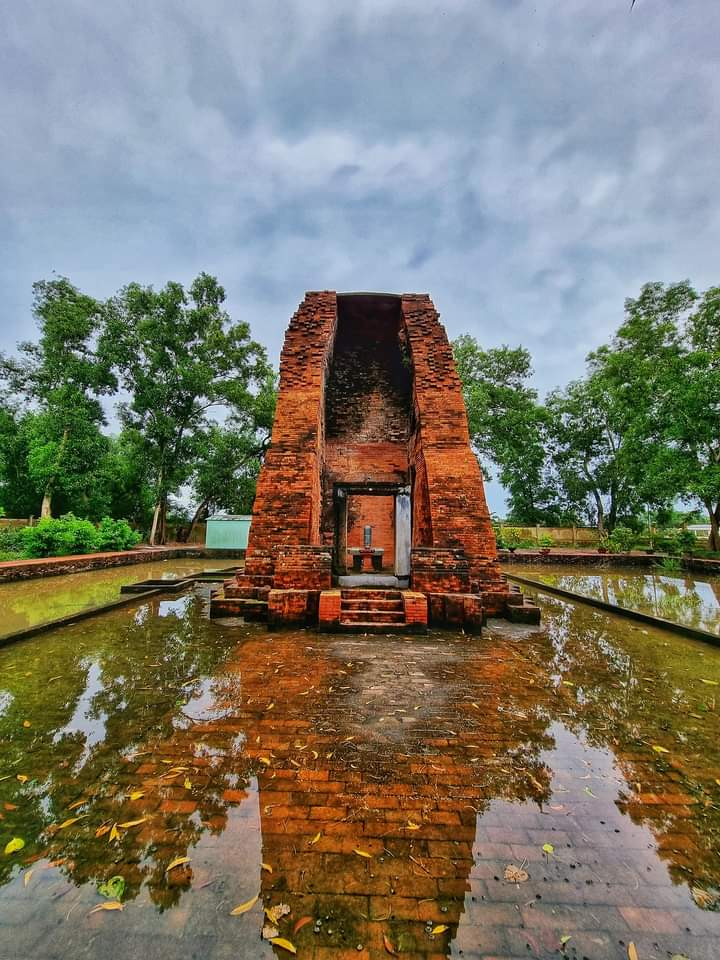
Vĩnh Hưng temple

== See also ==
- Post-Angkor period
- List of kings of Cambodia, a chronological list with reign, title, and posthumous title(s), where known
