= Phnom Kulen National Park =

National park in Cambodia

- Jayavarman-Norodom Phnom Kulen National Park
- IUCN category II (national park)
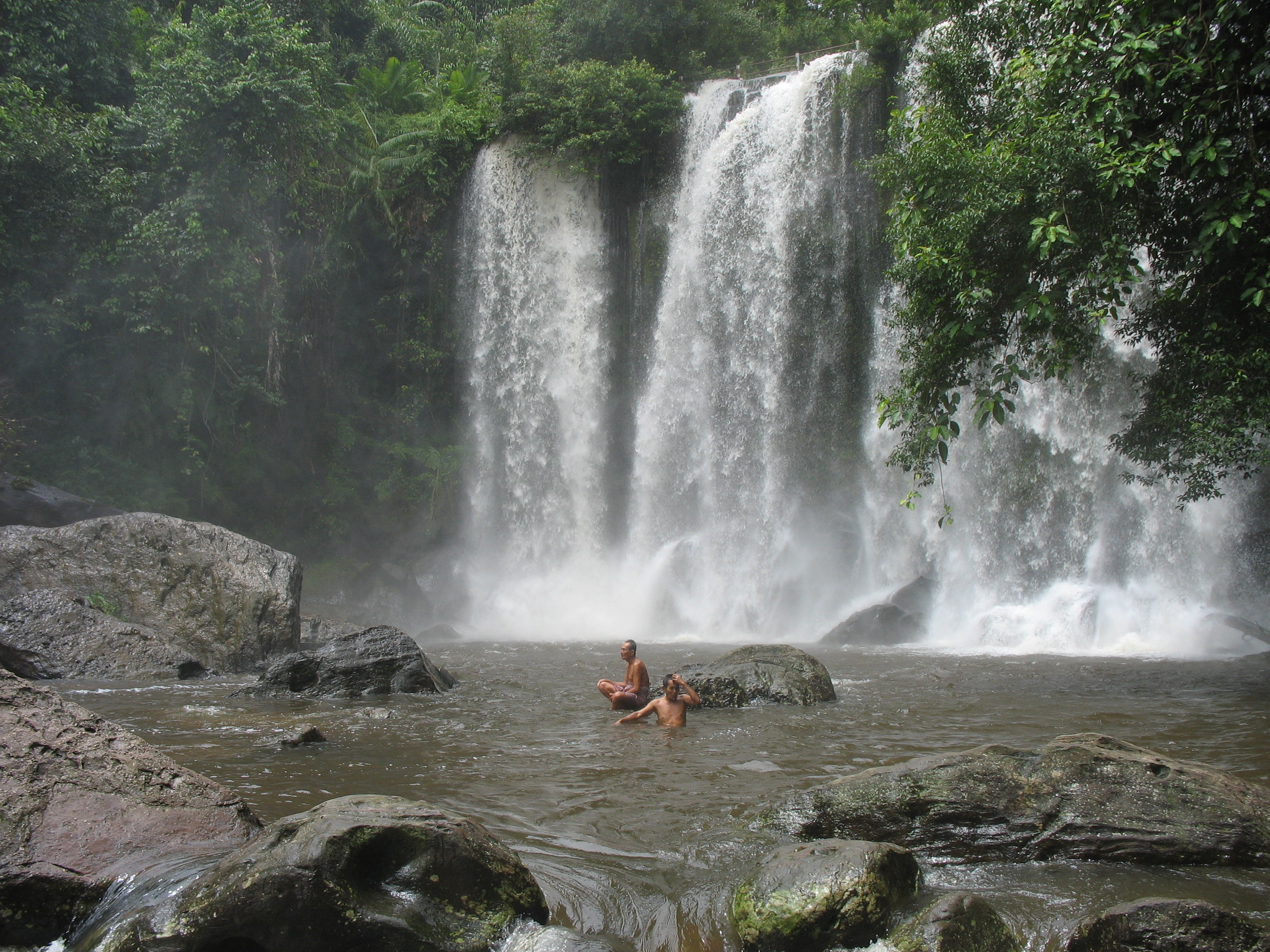
- Waterfall in Phnom Kulen National Park

- Location within Cambodia
- Location: Svay Leu District, Siem Reap Province, Cambodia
- Nearest city: Siem Reap
- Coordinates: 13°36′22″N 104°05′45″E
- Area: 373.76 km^{2} (144.31 sq mi)
- Established: 1993

The Phnom Kulen National Park (Khmer: ឧទ្យានជាតិភ្នំគូលែន) is a national park in Cambodia, located in the Phnom Kulen mountain massif in Siem Reap Province. It was established in 1993 and covers 373.76 km^{2} (144.31 sq mi). Its official name is Jayavarman-Norodom Phnom Kulen National Park (Khmer: ឧទ្យានជាតិព្រះជ័យវរ្ម័ន-នរោត្តម ភ្នំគូលែន).

During the Khmer Empire the area was known as Mahendraparvata (the mountain of Great Indra) and was the place where King Jayavarman II had himself declared chakravartin (King of Kings), an act which is considered the foundation of the empire.

== Archaeological sites ==
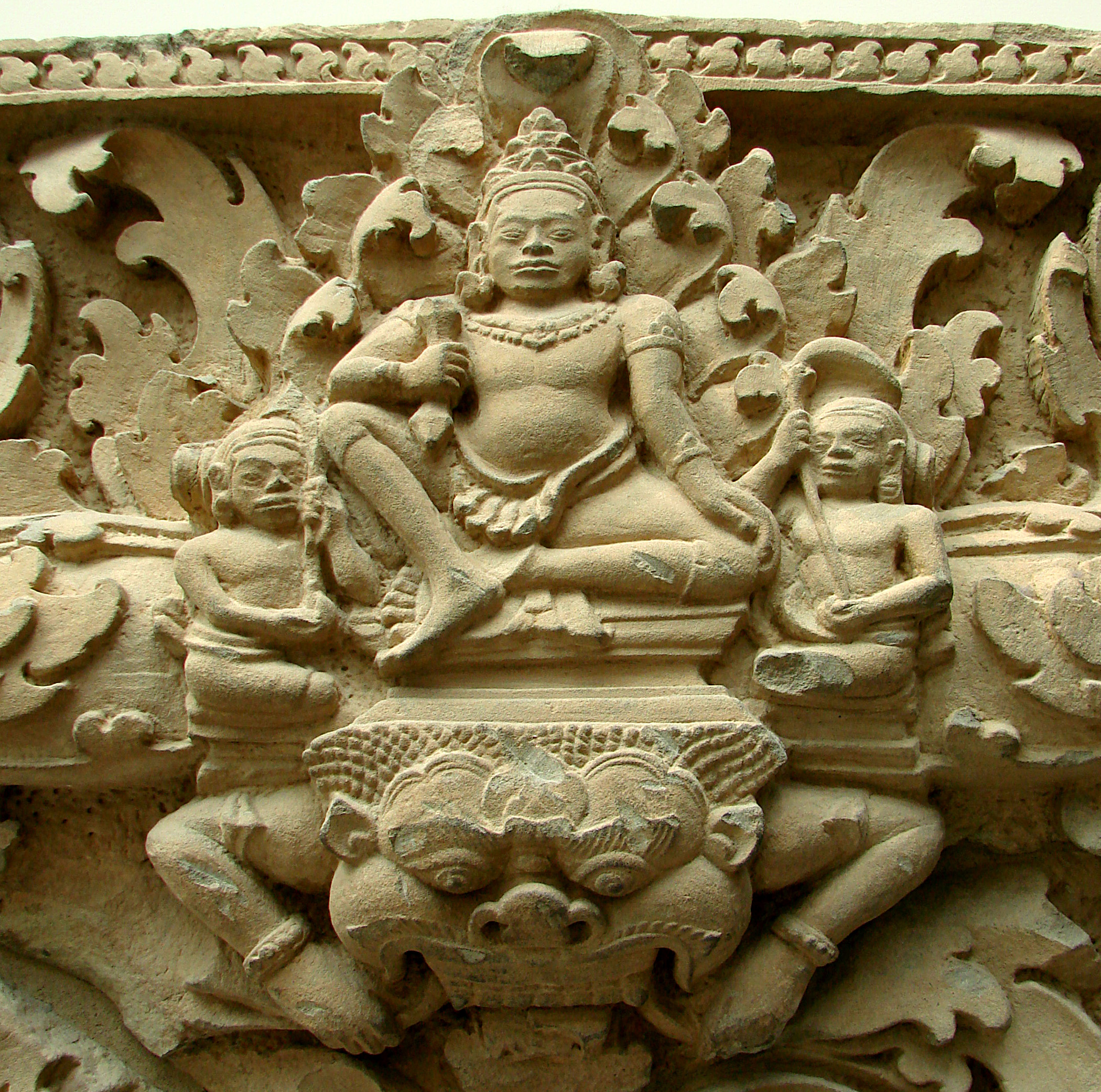
Indra Prasat Koki, 9th century

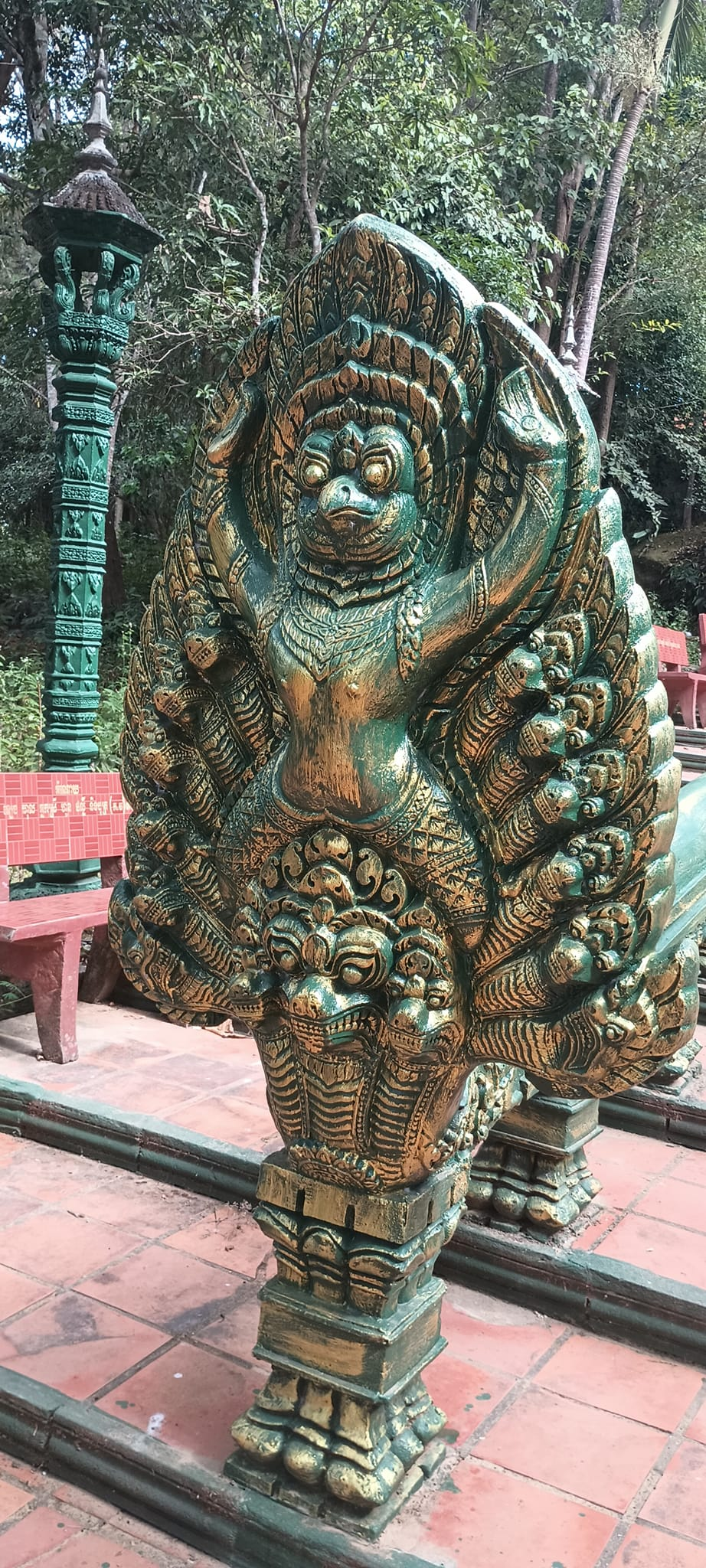
Khmer Garuda leading up to Wat Preah Ang Thom

Phnom Kulen National Park is located in Svay Leu District about 48 km (30 mi) from the provincial town of Siem Reap and about 25 km (16 mi) from Prasat Banteay Srey.

== Waterfalls ==
There are two main waterfalls in Phnom Kulen (Khmer: ទឹកធ្លាក់ភ្នំគូលែន):

- First waterfall: 4–5 metres (13–16 ft) tall and around 25 metres (82 ft) wide during the rainy seasons.
- Second waterfall: 15–20 metres (49–66 ft) tall and around 15 metres (49 ft) wide during the rainy seasons.

The size of the waterfalls varies according to the seasons and the rain. Visiting the waterfalls is a popular activity on Phnom Kulen tours.

== Archeological activities ==
After initial reconnaissances by French scholars, the historical relevance of Phnom Kulen was pointed out by Philippe Stern, who visited it in 1936 and described Rong Chen as the first temple-mountain. In 1973 and 1979 Jean Boulbet and Bruno Dagens published the fundamental archeological inventory and mapping of Phonm Kulen. In 2008 Archaeology & Development Foundation begun Phnom Kulen Program, an archaeological project focused even on sustainable development of local communities.

In June 2013, an archaeological team announced the discovery and mapping of the ancient city of Mahendraparvata on the slopes of Phnom Kulen. The multi-year expedition was notable for its use of Lidar technology to reveal the layout of the city from beneath jungle and earth. 30 previously unidentified temples have been discovered.

== Bibliography ==
- Rooney, Dawn F. (2005). Angkor: Cambodia's wondrous khmer temples (5th ed.). Odissey. ISBN 978-962-217-727-7.
- Higham, Charles (2001). The Civilization of Angkor. Phoenix. ISBN 1-84212-584-2.
