= Devaraja =

Deified monarch in medieval Southeast Asia

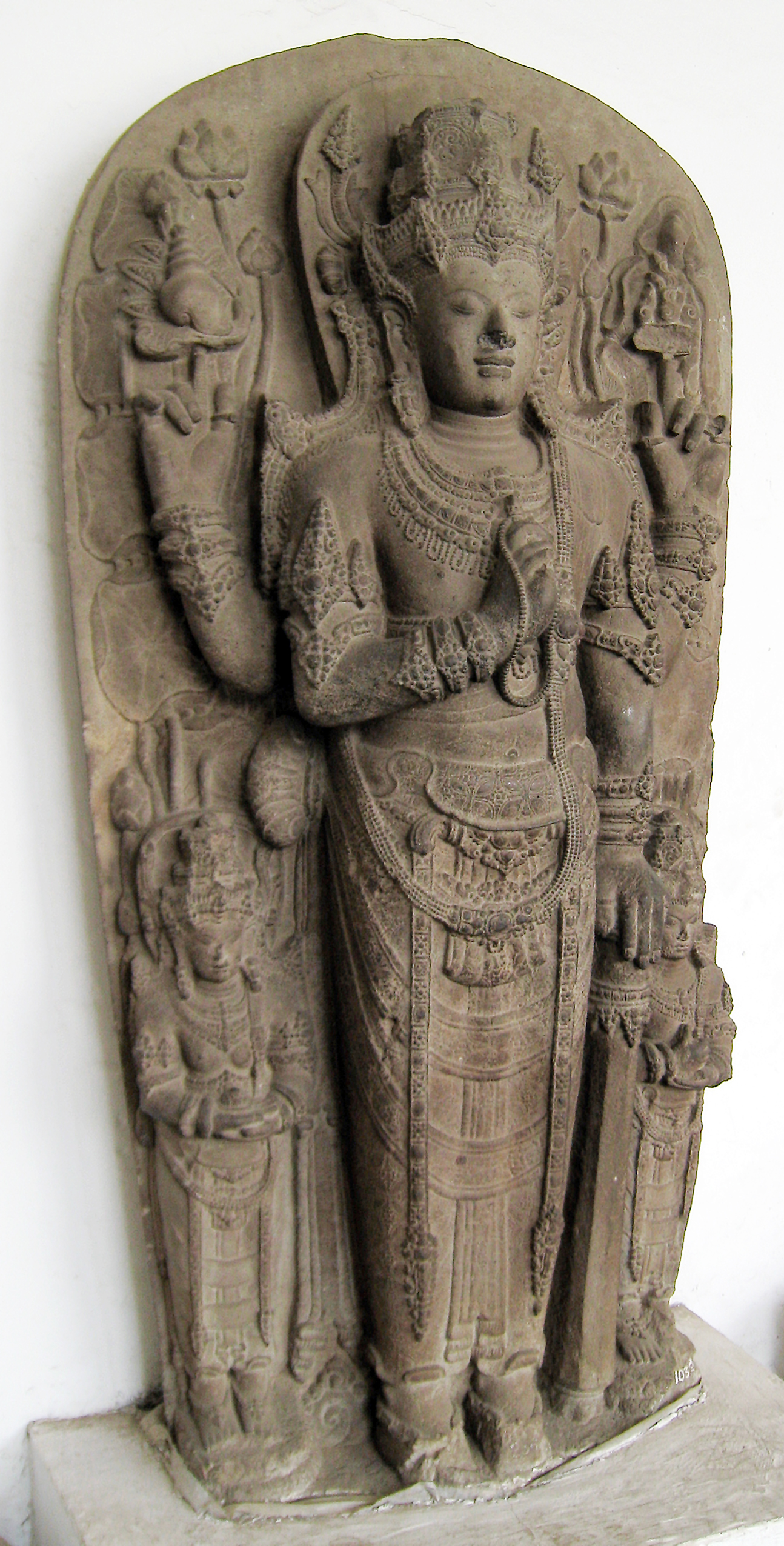
The statue of Harihara, the god amalgamation of Shiva and Vishnu, as the mortuary deified portrayal of King Kertarajasa of Majapahit. Revering the king as god incarnated on earth is the concept of devaraja.

Devaraja (Sanskrit: देवराज, romanized: Devarāja) was the religious and political concept of the "god-king" or deified monarch in ancient and medieval India and Southeast Asia. The concept of the devaraja developed from both Hinduism and other, local traditions depending on the area. It held that that the king was a divine, universal ruler and a manifestation of the gods (often attributed to Shiva or Vishnu) on Earth. The concept is closely related to the Indian concept of chakravarti (universal emperor). In the political context, it was viewed as the divine justification of a king's rule. The concept was institutionalised and expanded in ancient Java, Cambodia and Thailand, where monuments such as the Prambanan, Ayutthaya and the Angkor Wat were erected to celebrate the king's divine rule on Earth.

The devaraja concept of the divine status of kings was adopted by the Indianised Hindu-Buddhist kingdoms of Southeast Asia through the Indian Brahmin scholars that were deployed in the courts there. It was first adopted by Javanese kings, and thereafter by various Malay kingdoms, the Khmer Empire, and the Thai monarchies.

== Etymology and evolution ==
In Sanskrit the Hindu origin term deva-raja could have different meanings such as "god-king" or "king of the gods". In the Hindu and Vedic pantheons, the title of king of gods (devas) is held by the supreme God, Indra. Thus the mortal kingdom on earth mirrored the celestial kingdom of gods, the concept regarded the king as the living god on earth. It is also from influences in Hinduism and separate local traditions.

Indian origin religions (also called Dharmic or Indic religions) originated in the Indian subcontinent; namely Hinduism, Jainism, Buddhism. (Note: Adams: "Indian religions, including early Buddhism, Hinduism, Jainism, and Sikhism, and sometimes also Theravāda Buddhism and the Hindu- and Buddhist-inspired religions of South and Southeast Asia".). Hinduism, Buddhism have many references regarding Southeast Asia such as Suvarnabhumi. As evidenced from the history of Indian influence on Southeast Asia, including Thailand, the Southeast Asian kingdoms adopted Indian Sanskrit terms and Hindu-Buddhist concepts through the process of Indianisation and adoption of Sanskrit language; the evolution and spread of the concept of Deveraja is one such example.

The Devaraja concept evolved from the earlier Indian concept of "Chakravarti". Chakravarti refers to an ideal universal ruler, especially in the sense of an imperial ruler of the entire Indian sub-continent (as in the case of the Maurya Empire). The first references to a Chakravala Chakravartin appear in monuments from the time of the early Maurya Empire, in the 4th to 3rd century BCE, in reference to Chandragupta Maurya and his grandson Ashoka. In Hinduism, the term generally denotes a powerful ruler whose dominion extended to the entire earth. In Buddhist kingship and Jainism, the term generally applies to temporal as well as spiritual kingship and leadership. In Buddhism, the Chakravarti came to be considered the counterpart of a Buddha.

Ashoka was an emperor of the Maurya empire, who ruled almost all of the Indian subcontinent from c. 268 to 232 BCE. For the spread of Buddhism, he sent Buddhist missions to 9 destinations, including Tibet and China, Sri Lanka and Southeast Asia. Establishment of these early era links led to the ongoing transmission of Indian concepts to Southeast Asia.

== Devaraja concept of "the divine ruler" ==
=== Purpose ===
The Devaraja concept has been established through rituals and institutionalized within the Indianized kingdoms of Southeast Asia. It enables the monarch to claim the divine authority which could be used on ensuring political legitimacy, managing social order, economic and religious aspects. In political aspects, it strengthens the justification of the king and the ruling dynasty as the rightful ruler of the land. It is also used to maintain social order, exalting the king as a living god definitely demands the utmost service and devotion of his people. Introducing of Hindu, Buddhist religions to Southeast Asia led to adoption of many new customs.

The Devaraja religious order also enabled the king to embark on large scale public works and grand projects, by mobilizing their people to create and maintain elaborate hydraulic irrigation systems to support large scale rice agriculture or to construct imposing grand monuments and temples in the king's honor. The examples of these grand projects are Borobudur, Prambanan, the canal system Ayutthaya as an island city surrounded by three rivers, and also temples and barays in Angkor Wat.

=== Ritual ===
Example of the Devaraja religious order — such as demonstrated by Jayavarman II — associate the king with the Hindu deity Sri Shiva, whose divine essence was physically embodied by the linga (or lingam), a phallic idol housed in a mountain temple. The king was deified in an elaborate and mystical ceremony, requiring a high priest, in which the divine essence of kingship was conferred on the ruler through the agency of the linga. The safeguarding of the linga became bound up with the security of the kingdom, and the great temple architecture of the Khmer period attests to the importance attached to the belief.

== Adoption of the devaraja concept ==
=== Indian Subcontinent ===
==== South India ====
In Tamil culture, especially during the Sangam period, emperors were known as இறையர் (Iraiyer), or "those who spill", and kings were called கோ (Ko) or கோன் (Kon). During this time, king is venerated as representative of God. Even in Modern Tamil, the word for temple is 'கோயில்', meaning "king's house". Kings were understood to be the "agents of God", as they protected the world like God did. This may well have been continued till early medieval period in Tamilakam, as the famous Thiruvalangadu inscription states:

"Having noticed by the marks (on his body) that Arulmozhi was the very Vishnu" in reference to the Emperor Raja Raja Chola I.

=== Indianized polities in Southeast Asia ===
Indianised Hindu-Buddhist kingdoms of Southeast Asia deployed the Indian Hindu and Buddhist traders, monks, priests as scholars in their courts. Under the influence of these scholars these kingdoms adopted the concept of devaraja. It was first adopted by the Indianised Hindu-Buddhist kingdoms of Java. The Khmer empire which ruled Cambodia, Laos, Thailand, Vietnam and other parts of the nearby present day nations adopted it from the Javanese kings. Eventually, Thai kings adopted the concept from the nearby Khmer empire.

==== Javanese kingdoms ====
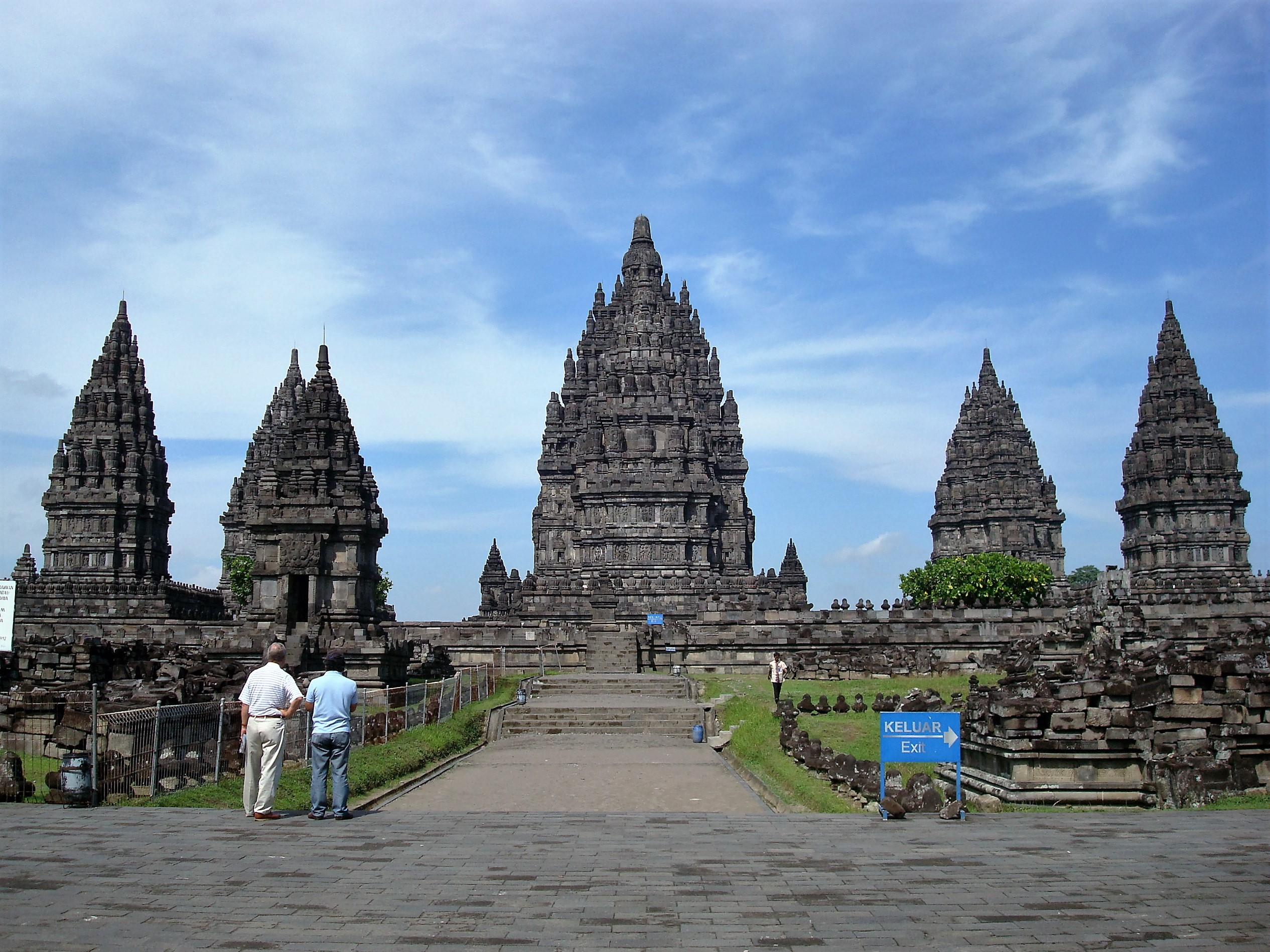
Prambanan Trimurti temple, according to Shivagrha inscription (856 CE) dedicated for the highest god Siwa Mahadewa

The concept of devaraja or God King was the ancient Cambodian state religion, but it probably originated in Java where the Hindu influence first reached Southeast Asia. Circa 8th century, Sailendras allegedly ruled over Java, Sumatra, the Malay Peninsula and parts of Cambodia. In ancient Java, since the Sailendra dynasty. The devaraja concept is believed to have been introduced to Java in 732, when king Sanjaya installed a linga to consecrate a new Mataram Dynasty, as stated in Canggal inscription, thus the king sought Shiva's protection of his rule.

In the even older Tarumanagara kingdom, the state religion regarded the king as god incarnated on earth. The Tarumanagara fifth century CE Ciaruteun inscription, inscribed with king's sole print, regarded King Purnawarman as the incarnation of Vishnu on Earth. The Kebon Kopi I inscription, also called Telapak Gajah stone, with an inscription and the engraving of two large elephant footprints, associated king's elephant ride as Airavata (elephant ride of God Indra), thus associated the king also with Indra.

In Mataram kingdom in Central Java, it is customary to erect candi (temple) to honor and sent the soul of a dead king. The image of god inside the garbhagriha (central chamber) of the temple often portrayed the deceased king as a god, as the soul of the dead king finally united with the revered god in Svargaloka. Some archaeologists propose that the statue of Shiva in the garbhagriha of Prambanan's main temple was modelled after King Balitung, serving as a depiction of his posthumous deified self. It is suggested that the concept was the fusion of Hinduism with native Austronesian ancestor worship. The 11th century great king Airlangga of Kahuripan in East Java, was deified posthumously as Vishnu in Belahan temple. In Java, the tradition of divine king continued well to Kediri, Singhasari, and Majapahit kingdom in the 15th century.

After the coming of Islam in the archipelago and the fall of Majapahit, the concept of God-King most likely ceased to exist in Java, since Islam rejects the concept of divinity in mortal human being. Yet the concept survived in traditional Javanese mysticism of Kejawen as wahyu, suggesting that every king and ruler in Java was bestowed wahyu, a divine authority and mandate from God. A heavenly mandate that could be revoked and transferred by God, to explain the change of dynasty in Java during Demak, Mataram Sultanate era, well to the succession of the president of Indonesia.

==== Cambodia and Khmer empire ====
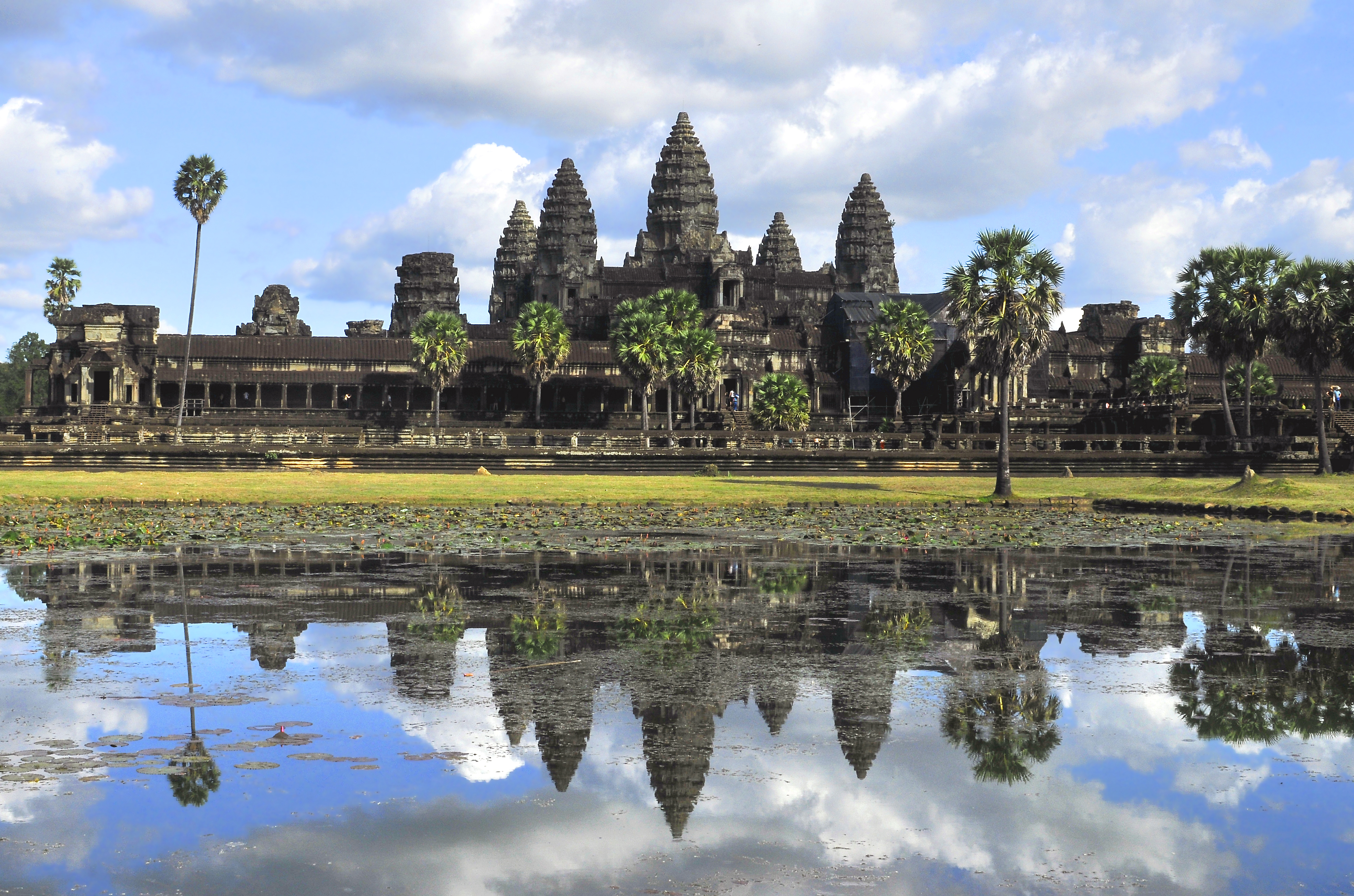
The concept of Devaraja enabled Khmer kings to embark on grand-scale projects, such as to build Angkor Wat.

In ancient Cambodia, devarāja is recognized as the state's institutionalized religion. The Cambodian concept of the "god-king" is believed to have been established early in the 9th century by Jayavarman II, founder of the Khmer empire of Angkor, with the Brahmana scholar Sivakaivalya as his first chief priest at Mahendraparvata. For centuries, the concept provided the religious basis of the royal authority of the Khmer kings.

In a Khmer context the term was used in the latter sense as "god-king", but occurs only in the Sanskrit portion of the inscription K. 235 from Sdok Kak Thom / Sdok Kăk Thoṃ (in modern Thailand) dated 8 February 1053 CE, referring to the Khmer term kamrateṅ jagat ta rāja ("Lord of the Universe who is King") describing the protective deity of the Khmer Empire, a distinctly Khmer deity, which was mentioned before in the inscription K. 682 of Chok Gargyar (Kòḥ Ker) dated 921/22 CE.

In the Sdok Kăk Thoṃ inscription, a member of a brahmana family claimed that his ancestors since the time of Jayavarman II (Khmer: ជ័យវរ្ម័នទី២), who established around 800 CE by marriage to the daughter of a local king in the Angkor region, a small realm which became at the end of the 9th century the famous Khmer Empire, were responsible for the concept of the Devarāja (kamrateṅ jagat ta rāja). Historians formerly dated his reign as running from 802 CE to 850 CE, but these dates are of very late origin (11th century) and without any historical basis. Some scholars now have tried to identify Jayavarman II with Jayavarman Ibis who is known from his inscriptions from Práḥ Thãt Práḥ Srĕi south of Kompoṅ Čàṃ (K. 103, dated 20 April 770) and from Lobŏ’k Srót in the vicinity of Kračèḥ close to the ancient town of Śambhupura (K. 134, dated 781 CE). The Sdok Kăk Thoṃ inscription incised c. 250 years after the events (of which their historicity is doubtful) recounts that on the top of the Kulen Hills, Jayavarman II instructed a Brahmana priest named Hiraṇyadāman to conduct a religious ritual known as the concept of the devarāja (Khmer: ទេវរាជា) which placed him as a cakravartin, universal monarch, a title never heard of before in Cambodia.

Coedes states, "...in southern India, Mount Mahendra was considered the residence of Siva as king of all gods (devaraja), including Indra Devaraja, and as sovereign of the country where the mountain stands. The ritual of the Devaraja established by the Brahmana Hiranydama was based on four texts - Vinasikha, Nayottara, Sammoha, and Siraccheda...the four faces of Tumburu. These Tantras "were supposed to have been uttered by the four mouths of Siva represented by the gandharva Tumburu." He goes on to state, "In the Indianized kingdoms of Southeast Asia, the Hindu cults...eventually became royal cults. The essence of royalty...was supposed to reside in a linga...obtained from Siva through a Brahmana who delivered it to the king...the communion between the king and the god through the medium of a priest took place on the sacred mountain."

Khmer emperor Jayavarman II is widely regarded as the king that set the foundation of the Angkor period in Cambodian history, beginning with the grandiose consecration ritual conducted by Jayavarman II (reign 790–835) in 802 on sacred Mount Mahendraparvata, now known as Phnom Kulen, to celebrate the independence of Kambuja from Javanese dominion (presumably the "neighboring Chams", or chvea). At that ceremony Prince Jayavarman II was proclaimed a universal monarch (Kamraten jagad ta Raja in Cambodian) or God King (Deva Raja in Sanskrit). According to some sources, Jayavarman II had resided for some time in Java during the reign of Sailendras, or "The Lords of Mountains", hence the concept of Devaraja or God King was ostensibly imported from Java. At that time, Sailendras allegedly ruled over Java, Sumatra, the Malay Peninsula and parts of Cambodia. An inscription from the Sdok Kak Thom temple recounts that at Mahendraparvata, Jayavarman II took part in a ritual by the Brahmana Hiranyadama, and his chief priest Lord Sivakaivalya, known as devaraja (Khmer: ទេវរាជា) which placed him as a chakravartin, Lord of the Universe.

Today, the tradition of public reverence to the King of Cambodia is said to be the continuation of this ancient concept of devaraja, and is mistakenly said of the King of Thailand.

==== Thailand ====
This concept of "god-king" (Thai: เทวราชา) (or "divine king") was adopted by the Thai kings from the ancient Khmer tradition of devaraja followed in the region, and the Hindu concept of kingship was applied to the status of the Thai king. The concept centered on the idea that the king was an incarnation (avatar) of the god Vishnu and that he was a Bodhisattva (enlightened one), therefore basing his power on his religious power, his moral power, and his purity of blood.

Priests took charge in the royal coronation. The king was treated as a reincarnation of Hindu gods. Ayutthaya historical documents show the official titles of the kings in great variation: Indra, Shiva and Vishnu, or Rama. Seemingly, Rama was the most popular, as in "Ramathibodhi". However, Buddhist influence was also evident, as many times the king's title and "unofficial" name "Dhammaraja", an abbreviation of the Buddhist Dharmaraja. The two former concepts were re-established, with a third, older concept taking hold.

The king, portrayed by state interests as a semi-divine figure, then became—through a rigid cultural implementation—an object of worship and veneration to his people. From then on the monarchy was largely removed from the people and continued under a system of absolute rule. Living in palaces designed after Mount Meru ("home of the gods" in Hinduism), the kings turned themselves into a "Chakravartin", where the king became an absolute and universal lord of his realm. Kings demanded that the universe be envisioned as revolving around them, and expressed their powers through elaborate rituals and ceremonies. For four centuries these kings ruled Ayutthaya, presiding over some of the greatest period of cultural, economic, and military growth in Thai History.

==== Other Indianised Rajanates and Sultanates in Southeast Asia ====
In the Malay Annals, the rajas and sultans of the Malay states (today encompassing modern Pattani, Malaysia, Indonesia, Brunei and Philippines) as well as their predecessors, such as the kingdom of Majapahit in Java, also claimed divine right to rule. The sultan is mandated by God and thus is expected to lead his country and people in religious matters, ceremonies as well as prayers. This divine right is called daulat (from the Arabic term dawlah 'state'), and although the notion of divine right is somewhat obsolete, it is still found in the phrase Daulat Tuanku (lit. 'thine power') that is used to publicly acclaim the reigning monarch (e.g. Yang di-Pertuan Agong and other sultans in Malaysia). The exclamation is essentially similar to the European "Long live the King" or the Chinese wànsuì, and often accompanies pictures of the reigning monarch and his consort on banners during royal occasions. In Indonesia, especially on the island of Java, the sultan's divine right is more commonly known as the wahyu, or 'revelation', but it is not hereditary and can be passed on to distant relatives.

== See also ==
- Buddhist kingship
- Chakravarti
- Chhatrapati
