= History of Buddhism in Cambodia =

Theravada Buddhism is the state religion of Cambodia, which has been present since at least the 5th century.

== Suvannaphum ==
King Ashoka sent missionaries to the land of Suwannaphum, which has sometimes been identified as the mainland southeast Asian region of Mon (now a state in Myanmar, the state of Mon) and Khmer (now Cambodia) people. The Mahavamsa, a Sinhalese Pali chronicle, mentions these missions.

"Unconfirmed Singhalese sources state that Buddhism was introduced to Suvannaphum, or the 'Golden Peninsula', as mainland Southeast Asia was once referred to, in the 3rd century B.C. under the reign of King Ashoka, the great Buddhist ruler. According to these sources, two monks, Sona and Uttara, were sent to propagate the doctrine of the Master in this region following the great council of 274 B.C. held in Asoka's capital Pataliputta, India. While this mission may be legendary, it indicates that Buddhism has been present in Southeast Asia for a long time. Various Buddhist sects and schools, including Tantrism, vied or coexisted with a dominant Brahmanism and indigenous animistic faiths for centuries before the rise of the classical Southeast Asian empires beginning in the 9th century A.D. In part through Indian merchant traders, Indian cultural influence was pervasive in this early period. In Funan (1st to 5th century A.D.) the first organized Khmer polity, the Khmer people embraced not only the diverse Brahmanic and Buddhist religions but also the social customs and mores of India."

== Funan Kingdom ==
In the period between 100 BCE and 500 CE, the Kingdom of Funan in the present-day Mekong Delta established a flourishing seafaring trade between China, Indonesia, and India. This kingdom was Hindu, with the kings of Funan sponsoring the worship of Vishnu and Shiva. Buddhism was already present in Funan as a secondary religion in these earliest times.

A Sanskrit inscription from 375 documents the presence of Buddhism in Funan. King Kuandinya Jayavarman (478-514) cultivated Buddhism and sent a Buddhist mission complete with Funanese Buddhist images, carved in coral, to the Emperor of China.

Another early inscription in Sanskrit dated 586–664 at Wat Prey Vier notes that two Buddhist monks named Ratnabhanu and Ratnasimha were brothers. Chinese texts attest that Buddhism flourished in Cambodia in the last half of the 5th century, and that King Jayavarman sent the Indian monk Nagasena to present a memorial in the Chinese Imperial court.

Buddhism was clearly beginning to assert its presence from about year 450 onward, and was observed by the Chinese traveler I Ching toward the close of the seventh century.

== Chenla Kingdom ==
The Kingdom of Chenla replaced Funan and endured from 500 to 700. Chenla extended from the Mekong Delta, and along the lands surrounding the Mekong and Tonle Sap rivers.

"According to Ma Touan-Lin, a 13th century Chinese chronicler, there were ten monasteries of Buddhist monks and nuns studying the sacred texts in the 4th and 5th centuries. He stated that two monks from Funan traveled to China in this period at the request of the Chinese emperor, to translate the Sanskrit Tipitika into Chinese. A passage from the History of Leang, a Chinese chronicle written in 502-556, tells us that King Rudravarman sent a mission of monks to China in 535 under the direction of an Indian monk, Gunaratana. The delegation arrived in China in 546, accompanied by 240 palm leaf manuscripts of Mahayana Buddhist texts. Evidence of a cult of Buddha's relics was seen in Rudravarman's request of the Chinese emperor for a 12-foot (3.7 m) long relic of Buddha's hair."

Buddhism was weakened in the Chenla period, but survived, as seen in the inscriptions of Sambor Prei Kuk (626) and those of Siem Reap dealing with the erection of statues of Avalokitesvara (791). Some pre-Angkorean statuary in the Mekong Delta region indicate the existence of Sanskrit-based Sarvastivada Buddhism.

Khmer-style Buddha images are abundant from the period of 600–800. Many Mahayana bodhisattva images also date from this period, often found alongside the predominantly Hindu images of Shiva and Vishnu.

An inscription from Ta Prohm temple in Bali province, dated about 625, states, that the Buddha, Dharma and Sangha are flourishing.

== Angkor Kingdom ==
The transition from Hindu god-king to Mahayana Buddha-king was probably gradual and imperceptible. The prevailing Vaishnavite and Shaivite faith traditions gave way to the worship of the Gautama Buddha and the Bodhisattva Avalokitesvara.

King Jayavarman II (802-869) is the first real Khmer king of the Angkor Empire. He proclaimed himself god-king and began to establish the capital of Angkor (Rolous) near present-day Angkor Wat.

The Buddhist Sailendra kingdom exercised suzerainty over Cambodia as a vassal state during the end of the eighth and the beginning of the ninth centuries. As a result, Jayavarman, as a young man, had lived in the court of Java and had visited Sumatra. When he returned to Cambodia, he proclaimed himself a god-king (deva-raja) according to Khmer traditions, identifying himself with Shiva. Nevertheless, he was increasingly friendly to and supportive of Mahayana Buddhist influence throughout his kingdom.

When King Jayavarman II returned to Cambodia from Java, he built three capitals in succession: Hariharalaya, Amarendrapura, and Mahendraparvata. One of these, Amarendrapura, identified with Banteai Chmar, was a Mahayana Buddhist city presided over by Avalokitesvara, the Buddhist bodhisattva of compassion.

Mahayana Buddhism therefore became increasingly established in his empire. The form of Mahayana Buddhism that was propagated in the Srivijaya lands was similar to the Pala Dynasty Buddhism of Bengal, and of the Nalanda University in northern India.

"The Bengal University of Nalanda in Megadha (now Behar) was the theological center of Mahayana Buddhism under the protection of the Pala Dynasty [750-1060]. Shivaist interpretations of Buddhism, tinged with Tantric mysticism (that may have revived portions of pre-Aryan northeastern Indian faith traditions) were worked out in Megadha and then were exported throughout insular and peninsular Southeast Asia, particularly to Java. Yashovarman I (889-910), who ruled from the vicinity of Rolous in the late ninth century, seems to have been a Shivite Buddhist influenced by Nalanda syncretism. His successors (notably Jayavarman IV) dedicated themselves to Vishnu and Brahma, as well as to Shiva, with whom they continued to be identified by hereditary families of priests. Rajendravarman II studied Buddhism intensely."

The Sailendra dynasty also built the fantastic Mahayana Buddhist temple Borobudur (750-850) in Java. Borobudur appears to have been the inspiration for the later fabulous Angkor building projects in Cambodia, particularly Angkor Wat and Angkor Thom.

The primary form of Buddhism practiced in Cambodia during Angkor times was Mahayana Buddhism, strongly influenced with Tantric tendencies.

"The prevalence of Tantrayana in Java, Sumatra and Kamboja [Cambodia], a fact now definitely established by modern researches into the character of Mahayana Buddhism and Sivaism in these parts of the Indian Orient. Already in Kamboja inscription of the 9th century there is definite evidence of the teaching of Tantric texts at the court of Jayavarman II. In a Kamboja record of the 11th century there is a reference to the 'Tantras of the Paramis'; and images of Hevajra, definitely a tantric divinity, have been recovered from amidst the ruins of Angkor Thom. A number of Kamboja inscriptions refer to several kings who were initiated into the Great Secret (Vrah Guhya) by their Brahmanical gurus; the Saiva records make obvious records to Tantric doctrines that had crept into Sivaism."

"But it was in Java and Sumatra that Tantrayana seems to have attained greater importance. There Mahayana Buddhism and Shaivism, both deeply imbued with tantric influences, are to be seen often blending with one another during this period. The Sang Hyang Kamahayanikan, consisting of Sanskrit verses explained by an Old Javanese commentary, professed to teach the Mahayana and Mantrayana."

The presence and growing influence of Buddhism continued as the Angkor empire increased in power. King Yosavarman built many Buddhist temples in 887–889, representing the mandala of Mount Meru, the mythical axis of the world. The largest of these temples is Phnom Kandal or "Central Mountain" which lies near the heart of the Angkor complex.

King Rajendravarman II (944-968) "studied Buddhism intensely. Although he decided to remain a Shivaist, he appointed a Buddhist, Kavindrarimathana, chief minister. Kavindrarimathana built shrines to Buddha and Shiva. Jayavarman V (son of Rajendravarman) also remained a devote of Shiva. He, too, permitted his own chief minister, Kirtipandita, to foster Mahayana Buddhist learning and divination."

=== Suryavarman I ===
Suryavarman I (1006–1050) ^{[9]} is considered the greatest of the Buddhist kings, with the exception of Jayavarman VII.

The origins of Suryavarman I are unclear but evidence point that he began his career in northeastern Cambodia. He came to the throne after a period of disputes between rival claims to the Khmer throne. However, the term "usurper" is not appropriate when speaking in the Khmer context of royal succession as the Khmer throne did not exclusively include paternal lines but also recognized and even valued more to an extent the royal maternal line.^{[10]}

A strong proponent of Mahayana Buddhism, he did not interfere or obstruct the growing presence and dissemination of Theravada Buddhism during his reign.

=== Jayavarman VII ===
Jayavarman VII (1181–1215) was the greatest of all Khmer Buddhist kings. Jayavarman VII worked tirelessly to establish Buddhism as the state religion of Angkor.

He was already an elderly man, perhaps 60, when he ascended the throne. Before becoming king, he had devoted his long life to meditation and tantra.

Sensing his mortality he worked feverishly to accomplish his works in "saving" the Khmer people and establishing a Buddhist empire in a race against time.

In 1177, the Cham Kingdom of central Vietnam had invaded and sacked Angkor, creating a sense of trauma and crisis throughout the Khmer Empire by attacking and looting the capital. King Jayavarman VII ascended the throne in a climate of crisis, and war.

Jayavarman VII was a Mahayana Buddhist, and he regarded himself to be a Dharma-king, a bodhisattva, whose duty was to "save the people" through service and merit-making, liberating himself in the process.

Scholars speculate why Khmer royalty rejected Hinduism and embraced Buddhism definitively at this time. Perhaps, they suggest, Jayavarman and his people had become disillusioned with the Hindu gods because of their failure to protect the Angkor Empire from being sacked by their enemies, the Cham. The Cham themselves were Hindu and worshiped Shiva, and the Khmer may have therefore felt an instinctive revulsion at the religion of their enemies.

Jayavarman withdrew his devotion from the old gods and began to identify more openly with Buddhist traditions. His regime marked a clear dividing line with the old Hindu past.

Before 1200, art in the temples mostly portrayed scenes from the Hindu pantheon such as Vishnu reclining on a lotus leaf, or the churning of the primeval sea of the milk of creation. After 1200, scenes from the Buddhist Jatakas, and life of the Buddha, along with scenes of the Ramayana began to appear as standard motif.

As a "bodhisattva king" Jayavarman VII was considered to be a living Buddha, or bodhisattva who turned his back from the brink of enlightenment to redeem or save his people from suffering; he imagined himself in a role similar to that of the present day Dalai Lama of Tibet.

Images of Jayavarman portray him in the ascetic pose seated in meditation with a serene, enlightened expression. He built numerous public works to serve the people, including waterworks, hospitals, temples, hospices for travelers.

Stone inscriptions say he "suffered from the maladies of his subjects more than from his own; for it is the public griefs that make a king's grief, and not his own."

Another inscription reads: "Filled with a deep sympathy for the good of the world, the king swore this oath; 'All beings who are plunged in the ocean of existence, may I draw them out by virtue of this good work. And may the kings of Cambodia who come after me, attached to goodness...attain with their wives, dignitaries and friends, the place of deliverance where there is no more illness.'"

Profound psychological change was underway in Jayavarman VII's reign. There was a shift away from the cult of devaraja god-king, toward the cult of the Sangha, the cult of monks. In former times, great effort and resources were invested into building temples for elite brahman priests and god-kings. Under Jayavarman, these resources were redirected to building libraries, monastic dwellings, public works, and more "earthly" projects accessible to the common people.

His temple, the Bayon in Angkor Thom, is the first temple built without walls, indicating its openness to all the people, not exclusive to the god-king and his Brahmin priests. The walls of the Bayon are decorated with scenes from the daily life of the people fishing, eating, gambling and cock-fighting, rather than the heroic deeds of gods and kings.

King Jayavarman considered the Bayon as his masterpiece, his "bride." A stone inscription says "the town of Yosadharapura, decorated with powder and jewels, burning with desire, the daughter of a good family...who married by the king in the course of a festival that lacked nothing, under the spreading dais of his protection."

The purpose of this mystical marriage of King and people, the inscription goes on to say, was the "procreation of happiness throughout the universe."

The building projects commissioned by Jayavarman were redolent with tantric Buddhist symbolism. The word "bayon" means "ancestor yantra" - a magic symbol of geometric shape of tantric Buddhism. In the center of the Bayon temple was an image of Buddha-Mucalinda: the Buddha sitting on a seven-headed cobra, with the serpent's hood unveiled above the Buddha as protection from the elements. The Buddha image has the features of Jayavarman VII himself.

Jayavarman other major temple projects included Preah Khan and Ta Prohm.

While Jayavarman VII himself was Mahayana Buddhist, the presence of Theravada Buddhism was increasingly evident. "This Singhalese-based Theravada Buddhist orthodoxy was first propagated in Southeast Asia by Taling (Mon) monks in the 11th century and together with Islam in the 13th century in southern insular reaches of the region, spread as a popularly-based movement among the people. Apart from inscriptions, such as one of Lopburi, there were other signs that the religious venue of Suvannabhumi were changing. Tamalinda, the Khmer monk believed to be the son of Jayavarman VII, took part in an 1180 Burmese-led mission to Sri Lanka to study the Pali canon and on his return in 1190 had adepts of the Sinhala doctrine in his court. Zhou Daguan, who led a Chinese mission into Angkor in 1296-97 confirms the significant presence of Pali Theravada monks in the Khmer Capital."

== Decline of Angkor & the Emergence of a Theravada Kingdom ==
After the 13th century, Theravada Buddhism became the state religion of Cambodia.

King Jayavarman VII had sent his son Tamalinda to Sri Lanka to be ordained as a Buddhist monk and study Theravada Buddhism according to the Pali scriptural traditions. Tamalinda then returned to Cambodia and promoted Buddhist traditions according to the Theravada training he had received, galvanizing and energizing the long-standing Theravada presence that had existed throughout the Angkor empire for centuries.

During the time Tamalinda studied at the famous Mahavihara Monastery in Sri Lanka (1180–1190), a new dynamic type of Theravada Buddhism was being preached as the "true faith" in Sri Lanka. This form of Buddhism was somewhat militant and highly disciplined in reaction to the wars with the Tamil that nearly destroyed Buddhism in Sri Lanka in the 9th and 10th centuries. As Theravada Buddhism struggled for survival in Sri Lanka, it developed a resiliency that generated a renaissance throughout the Buddhist world, and would eventually spread across Burma, Chang Mai, the Mon kingdoms, Lana, Sukothai, Laos, and Cambodia.

In the 13th century, wandering missionaries from the Mon-Khmer-speaking parts of Siam, Burma, Cambodia, and Sri Lanka played an important part in this process.

When Prince Tamalinda returned after ten years of ordination, he was a Thera, a senior monk, capable of administering ordination into this vigorous Theravada lineage, which insisted on orthodoxy and rejected Mahayana "innovations" such as tantric practices.

Some scholars have argued that the transition from Mahayana to Theravada was more gradual than it was generally believed. French scholar Nicolas Revire has studied an Angkor stele, now at the Bangkok National Museum, depicting as late as the 13th or 14th century the Mahayana image of Buddha's birth where Buddha emerges from his mother's side at the moment of delivery. Revire believes this suggests that a kind of Mahayana “leftover ‘behavior’” persisted even after the institutional transition to Theravada had been completed.

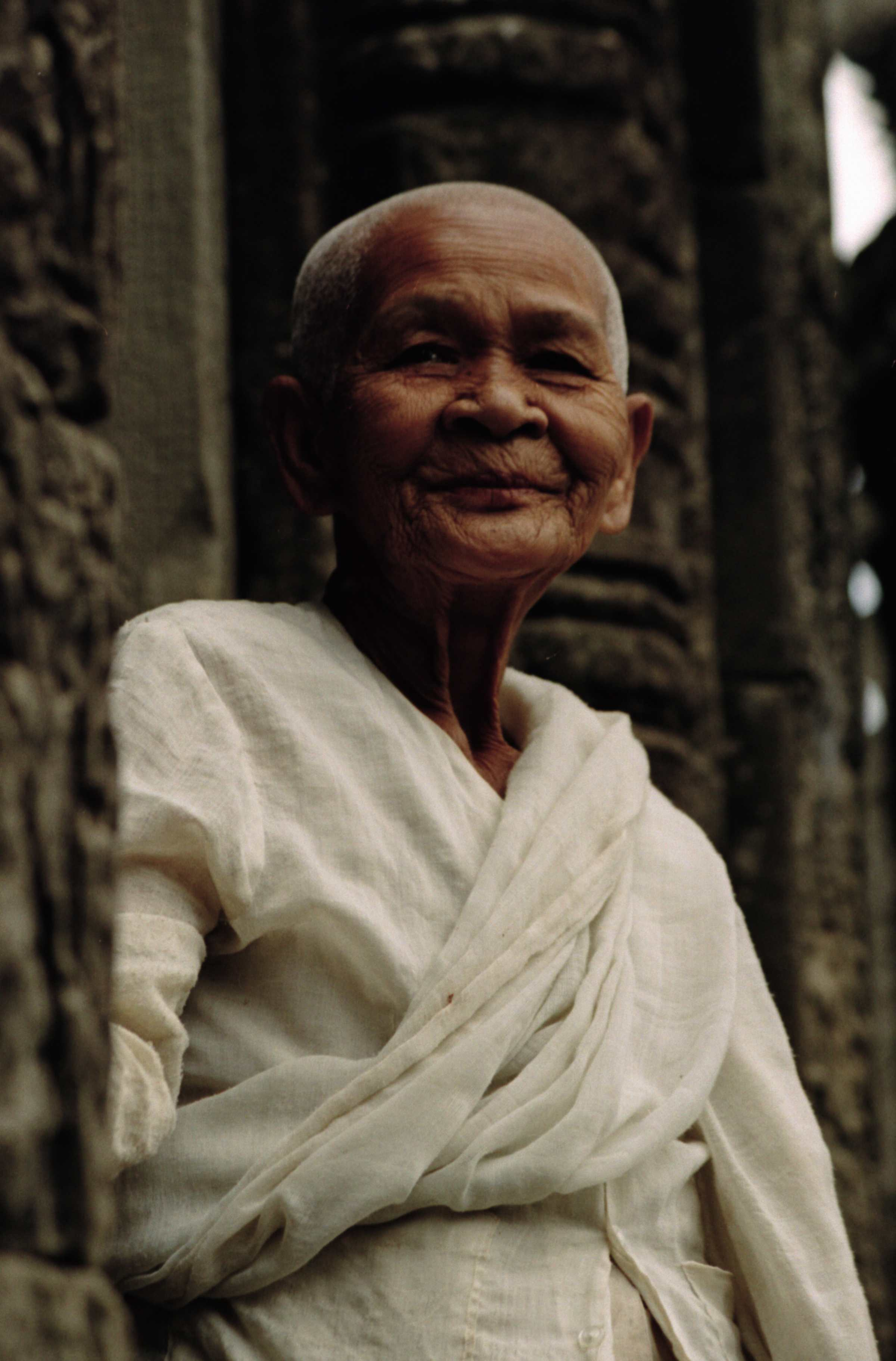
Buddhist nun. Bayon Temple, Angkor Wat, Siem Reap, Cambodia (January 2005).

The mass conversion of Khmer society to Theravada Buddhism amounted to a nonviolent revolution every all level of society. All monumental building projects that had characterized the Angkor empire came to a sudden end. Scholars struggle to account for this sudden and inexplicable transformation of Khmer civilization.

Theravada Buddhism succeeded because it was inclusive and universal in its outreach, recruiting the disciples and monks from not only the elites and court, but also in the villages and among the peasants, enhancing its popularity among the Khmer folk.

"Their message succeeded because it provided a meaningful way of relating to the world for many who had been marginal to the classical civilizations or who had been seriously affected by the disruption of the classical civilizations in the 13th and 14th centuries."

Journalist Elizabeth Becker explained the phenomenon: "Cambodians were ripe for conversion. The political integrity and morality of the kingdom were thrown into question at the time, and Cambodians converted en masse to this new faith that offered social tranquility without striving for material gain or power. The modest Buddhist bonzes were a welcome change from the arrogant and wealthy priests of the kings. The new Buddhists dressed in simple saffron robes. They possessed a sense of responsibility for all, not just the nobility. Eventually they became as revered as the devaraja, who in turn became a Theravada Buddhist himself as patron of the faith."

Other scholars suggest that the classical Angkor Empire collapsed from desertion from within and assault from without, from growing external threats and assaults from Siam and Vietnam which were both in ascendancy at the time.

"The post-Angkor period saw the dramatic rise of the Pali Theravada tradition in Southeast Asia and concomitant decline of the Brahmanic and Mahayana Buddhist religious traditions. A 1423 Thai account of a mission to Sri Lanka mentions eight Khmer monks who again brought orthodox Mahavihara sect of Singhalese order to Kampuchea. This particular event belied, however, the profound societal shift that was taking place from priestly class structure to a village-based monastic system in Theravada lands. While adhering to the monastic discipline, monks developed their wats, or temple-monasteries, not only into moral religious but also education, social-service, and cultural centers for the people. Wats became the main source of learning and popular education. Early western explorers, settlers, and missionaries reported widespread literacy among the male populations of Burma, Thailand, Kampuchea, Laos, and Vietnam. Until the 19th century, literacy rates exceeded those of Europe in most if not all Theravada lands. In Kampuchea, Buddhism became the transmitter of Khmer language and culture."

The Theravada revolution was therefore a grassroots movement of the Khmer people rejecting some of the oppressive practices of the god-king religion of Hinduism and Mahayana Buddhism.

With the rise of Siam in the west and Vietnam in the east, the classical Angkor empire disappeared and the beginning of present-day Cambodia began. The center of government began to migrate away from Angkor to a more central location in the center of Cambodia, in the regions near present-day Phnom Penh.

Cambodia became from this time forward a Theravada Buddhist nation. "Theravada Buddhism, unlike almost all the previous religions of the country, its doctrines were not imposed from above but were preached to the people. It was simple, required no expensive priesthood or temples and little ceremonial. Its missionaries practiced austerity, solitude, humility, and poverty. Their example and their direct contact with the people started to undermine the old state religion and the monastery which rested upon it. Theravada Buddhism remained the great belief and comfort of the Khmer people until 1975."

Zhou Daguan, a Chinese visitor to the Royal Court of Cambodia at this time wrote of the presence of Theravada Buddhist monks in the latter days of Angkor.

Zhou Daguan was an emissary from the court of Timur Khan, Emperor of China. Daguan lived in Angkor Thom for one year 1296-7 and wrote a small book about his observations in which he described Theravada monks with shaved heads, yellow robes and one shoulder bare, walking barefoot throughout Cambodia. Their temples were simple, he said, containing one image of Sakyamuni Buddha. The image was draped in yellow cloth.

The Theravada monks ate meat or fish but did not drink wine. They ate only one meal a day. They did not cook in the temple, but lived on alms food.

"The books they recited from were very numerous. These were made of neatly bound palm leaves covered with black writing. Some of the monks were royal counselors, and therefore had the right to be conveyed in palanquins with gold shafts accompanied by umbrellas with gold or silver handles. There were no Buddhist nuns."

== Middle Ages ==
The Jinakalamali gives an account of the cultural connections between Cambodia and Sri Lanka in the fifteenth century. It states that 1967 years after the Mahaparinibbana of the Buddha, eight monks headed by Mahananasiddhi from Cambodia with 25 monks from Nabbispura in Thailand came to Sri Lanka to receive the umpasampada ordination at the hands of the Sinhalese Mahatheras.

As Angkor collapsed under the advancing jungles, the centre of power of the Theravada Cambodia moved south toward present day Phnom Penh. Phnom Penh was originally a small riverside market center where the Mekong River and the Tonle Sap River converge.

Phnom Penh was founded when Lady Penh found a "four-faced Buddha" floating down the river on a Koki tree during the flooding season. She retrieved the Buddha image and had the Wat Phnom constructed to house the image. The four-faced Buddha [Buddha facing the four directions] is important in Khmer Buddhist iconography, signifying the establishment of the kingdom of the Buddha of the Future, Maitreya, who is often identified with the Buddha-king of Cambodia.

After 1431 when the Cambodian kings permanently abandoned Angkor due to a Siamese invasion, the royal court was located on Udon Mountain, a few kilometres north of Phnom Penh. Siamese incursions from the west and Vietnamese invasions from the east weakened the Khmer empire. The Vietnamese invaders attempted to suppress Theravada Buddhism and force the Khmer people to practice Mahayana Buddhism. The Siamese, on the other hand, would periodically invade Cambodia and attempt to drive out the "unbelievers" in an attempt to protect the Theravada religion. This power-struggle between the two ascendant powers continued until the arrival of the Europeans in the 16th century.

Buddhism continued to flourish in Cambodia in the sixteenth century. King Ang Chan (1516–1566), a relative of King Dhammaraja, was a devout Buddhist. He built pagodas in his capital and many Buddhist shrines in different parts of Cambodia. In order to popularize Buddhism, King Satha (1576-1549), son and successor of King Barom Reachea, restored the great towers of the Angkor Wat, which had become a Buddhist shrine by the sixteenth century.

When Western merchants and missionaries first made contact with Cambodia, they discovered a three-tiered society consisting of the nobility, the common people (who were primarily rice farmers), and the Buddhist monks who were custodians of Khmer culture and identity.

Each successive wave of European influence was accompanied by Catholic missionaries, but Theravada Buddhism proved surprisingly resistant to foreign attempts to convert the Khmer people.

In 1556, the Portuguese missionary Gaspar de Cruz spent about a year in Cambodia and visited the capital at Lovek where King Cham reigned. The missionary complained bitterly of his inability to convert the Khmer people to Christianity, and blamed the Buddhist monks for his failure: The monks, he said, are "exceedingly proud and vain...alive they are worshiped for gods, in so that the inferior among them do worship the superior like gods, praying unto them and prostrating themselves before them; and so the common people have great confidence in them, with great reverence and worship; so that there is no person that dare contradict them in anything... [It] happened sometimes that while I was preaching, many round me hearing me very well, and being very satisfied with what I told them, that if there came along any of these priests and said, 'This is good but ours is better,' they would all depart and leave me alone.'"

== Colonial Era ==
During the colonial period, the peace was periodically breached by outbreaks of religiously motivated violence. Periodic millenarian revolts, often led by charismatic monks or self-proclaimed holy men. In 1820–21, a Millennial uprising was led by a former monk named Kai, who was recognized as a holy man with supernatural powers. He organized a revolt against the Vietnamese overlords from his hideout in Ba Phanom.

During the seventeenth, eighteenth, and nineteenth centuries, Thailand's involvement in Cambodian politics extended Thai influence into religious matters as well. In 1855, King Norodom invited monks from the Thai Dhammayuttika Nikaya to establish a Dhammayuttika presence in Cambodia. Maha Pan, a Khmer monk who had studied under some of the same teachers as Thailand's Mongkut, was appointed the first sangharaja of the new Khmer Dhammayuttika tradition (usually referred to as 'Thommayut'), taking up residence at Wat Botum Vaddey, a new temple built adjacent to the palace in Phnom Penh.

The newly formed Thommayut order benefited from royal patronage, but frequently came into conflict with the existing Mohanikay (Mahanikaya) lineage. The Thommayut were sometimes accused of holding loyalty to the Thai court, rather than to the Khmer nation.

Cambodia was recognized by the West as a "protectorate" of France in 1867. Over the course of the next forty years, the territory of modern Cambodia was integrated as a colony into French Indo-China through a series of "protective" agreements with the Vietnamese, and treaty concessions from Thailand. Periodic convulsions of violence, led by Buddhist holy men, would periodically break out against the French.

During the era of French rule, significant advances were made in the education of Cambodian monks, both in specifically Buddhist topics and more general studies. In Phnom Penh, a Pali high school for monks was created in 1914, and later converted into a college. This four-year diploma granting program for monks included not only education in the Pali language and Buddhist canon, but also basic education in modern, secular topics. Beginning in 1933, elementary Pali schools were established to provide new monks with a shorter introduction to Pali. These schools eventually developed into broader monastic schools, where all monks were given basic education in the dhamma-vinaya. In 1961, a Buddhist university, the Buddhist University of Phra Sihanu-Raja began instruction.

Primary education of Cambodian children continued to take place at temple schools. Monks were also encouraged to become involved in community development projects.

== Pol Pot regime ==
When the China puppet Pol Pot regime seized power in 1975, their goals included constant atrocities against every religious groups, with nearly every monk and religious intellectual having been either murdered or driven into exile, nearly every Buddhist temple, library, statues had been destroyed.

Pol Pot regime policies towards Buddhism- which included the forcible disrobing and defrocking of monks and nuns, the destruction of monasteries, and, ultimately, the execution of uncooperative Buddhists effectively destroyed Cambodia's Buddhist institutions. Monks and nuns who did not flee and avoided execution lived among the laity, sometimes secretly performing Buddhist rituals for the sick or afflicted.

Forced marriage was enforced by Pol Pot regime, where anyone can be forced to marry anyone regardless of their age and religious beliefs. Buddhist monks and nuns were not exempted either and were forced into literal Shotgun wedding, as well as other weapons preferred by Pol Pot regime enforcers.

Estimates vary regarding the number of monks in Cambodia prior to the ascension of the Khmer Rouge, ranging between 65,000 and 80,000. By the time of the Buddhist restoration in the early 1980s, the number of Cambodian monks worldwide was estimated to be less than 3,000. The patriarchs of both Cambodian Nikāyas were murdered or perished sometime during the period 1975–78, though the cause of their deaths is not known.

Due to their association with the Thai monarchy, monks of the Thommayut Order may have been particularly targeted for persecution.

Buddhism in Cambodia was spared from absolute eradication in the wake of Third Indochina War, in which People's Army of Vietnam rapidly crushed Pol Pot forces, beaten back Pol Pot invasion, and chased Pol Pot regime out from Cambodian capital city.

With over 15 000 Chinese advisors being hunted down and killed by Viet intelligence to avenge the victims, and China being unable to send any reinforcement, remnants of Pol Pot regime fled to remote border of Thailand, thus Buddhism in Cambodia were able to recover.

== People's Republic of Kampuchea ==
Buddhist monks and nuns participated in Kampuchean United Front for National Salvation revolution against Pol Pot regime, of which Cambodian Buddhist community proudly celebrate in every anniversary with songs, paintings, stamps, murals, stupas, monuments glorifying their roles. Following challenges to the legitimacy of the Vietnamese-backed People's Republic of Kampuchea, policies towards Buddhism began to liberalize starting in the summer of 1979. A group of monks who had been exiled and re-ordained in Vietnam during the Khmer Rouge period were returned back to Cambodia, and in 1981 one of them, Venerable Tep Vong, was elected the first Sangharaja of a new unified Cambodia sangha, officially abolishing the division between the Thommayut Order and the Mohanikay Order. The ordination of new monks was sponsored by the government as a public show of piety and lifted restrictions on ordination.

== Modern Era ==
Following the withdrawal of the Vietnamese military, the newly renamed Cambodian People's Party sought to align itself with the Buddhist sangha, declaring Buddhism to be Cambodia's 'state religion' in a 1991 policy statement. In 1991, King Sihanouk returned from exile and appointed Venerable Tep Vong as the Sangharaja of Mohanikay Order and Venerable Bour Kry as the Sangharaja of the Thommayut Order, effectively marking the end of the unified system created under Vietnamese rule in 1981.

Today traditional Buddhism is struggling to re-establish itself although the lack of Buddhist scholars and foremost seriously practicing Monks, caused by the overwhelming of modern influences and consumer-culture. Strong tendency toward Vipassana-movement and use of the Dhamma for merely social services follows the modern global religious phenomena, although there are still some conservative pillars stabil within the society.
