= Mahendraparvata (disambiguation) =

Mahendraparvata is an ancient city of the Khmer Empire era in Cambodia.

Mahendraparvata may also refer to:

- Mount Mahendraparvata, now known as Phnom Kulen, sacred mountain of the Khmer Empire
- Mahendra Parvat, or Mahendragiri (Odisha), a mountain peak in India
