= Jayavarman II =

9th-century king of Cambodia

- Chakravartin

King of the Khmer Empire
- Reign: 802 – 850
- Predecessor: Himself as King of Lower Chenla
- Successor: Jayavarman III

King of Lower Chenla (Water Chenla)
- Reign: c. AD 780–802
- Predecessor: Mahipativarman
- Successor: Himself as King of the Khmer Empire

King consort of Sambhupura
- Tenure: c. 780s
- Born: c. 770; Chenla or Java
- Died: 850 (aged 79–80); Angkor, Khmer Empire (now in Siem Reap, Cambodia)
- Spouse: Hyang Amrita, Jayendrabhā
- Issue: Jyeṣṭhāryā, Jayavarman III
- Religion: Hinduism

Jayavarman II (Khmer: ជ័យវរ្ម័នទី២; c. 770 – 850 CE, reigned c. 802–850 CE) was a Khmer prince who founded and became the first ruler of the Khmer Empire. Jayavarman II declared independence from a polity named "Java" in the Khmer inscriptions, probably referring to the island of Java in the Indonesian archipelago, although the exact location is disputed. He founded several capitals such as Mahendraparvata, Indrapura, and Hariharalaya.

Before Jayavarman II came to power, the local overlords who ruled different parts of Cambodia were in a state of constant warfare, and much of the area fell under the orbit of the Shailendra dynasty of Srivijaya. As a child, Jayavarman II had been held in captivity or exile in Java, and was installed as Java's vassal around 800. By starting off with weaker kingdoms, he built himself up from there eventually leading to the Khmer Empire. The Khmer Empire was the dominant civilization in mainland Southeast Asia from the 9th century until the mid-15th century.

No inscriptions securely identified with Jayavarman II have been found. The later kings of the Khmer Empire described him as a warrior and the most powerful king from that time frame that they could recall. Historians formerly dated his reign as running from 802 to 850 CE.

== Background and early life ==
Mahipativarman, the last king of Chenla, expressed his desire before his courtiers, to see the chopped head of the king of Zabag which is identified with Java. This information became known to Dharanindra, the king of Java, who invaded and conquered the Water Chenla and beheaded Mahipativarman. And then, the king of Zabag installed a new king, Jayavarman II, on the throne as his vassal. According to the Baksei Chamkrong inscription, dated to 947, Jayavarman II was born in the lineage of Rudravarman and hence was a descendant of the legendary Kaundinya and Soma. Jayavarman first remained subordinate to Java for some time and thereafter declared independence.

In 780, the Javanese Shailendra dynasty launched a naval attack on the city of Kumbhupura in Kratié province. Jayavarman II fled to Indrapura, Tboung Khmum province, and built the fortress of Prey Angkor Thom Nokor there in 781. Jayavarman II became king in Indrapura that year, and married Jayendrabhā, the queen regnant of Sambhupura in Chenla, in order to unite Cambodia under one king. Jayavarman II became King consort of Sambhupura by marrying her.

Jayavarman II was supported by his guru, Sivakaivalya, who trained him in the laws, building a kingdom, and various military skills, as he was still young at the time. In the later years (790–800), he declared war to expel the Javanese from Cambodia and moved the capital to the Kulen Mountains, with the capital called Mahindra Pot, and built many sacred places such as the Akyam Temple and the Baam Temple to perform the Devaraja Preah Shivaya ceremony of his coronation as the earthly king of the Khmer Empire in the year 802.

== Universal monarch and expansion of empire ==
Jayavarman II is widely regarded as the king who set the foundation of the Angkor period in Cambodian history, beginning with the grandiose consecration ritual he conducted in 802 on Mount Mahendraparvata, now known as Phnom Kulen. At that ceremony, he was proclaimed a universal monarch (Kamraten jagad ta Raja in Khmer) or devaraja (ទេវរាជ in Khmer). An inscription from the Sdok Kak Thom temple recounts that at Mahendraparvata, Jayavarman II took part in a ritual performed by the Brahmin Hiranyadama, and his chief priest Lord Sivakaivalya, which consecrated him as a chakravartin, or Lord of the universe.

Records suggest that Jayavarman and his followers moved over the course of some years from southeast Cambodia to the northwest, subduing various principalities along the way. Jayavarman II founded Hariharalaya near present-day Roluos, the first settlement in what would later become the Khmer Empire. Historian Claude Jacques writes that he first seized the city of Vyadhapura in the southeast, then pushed up the Mekong River to take Sambhupura. He later installed himself at another city state, now known as Banteay Prei Nokor, near present-day Kompong Cham. Jacques believes that from there he pressed on to Wat Pu, seat of a city-state in present-day southern Laos, then moved along the Dangrek Mountains to arrive in the Angkor region. Later he brought pressure on local Khmer leaders located to the west, but they fought back and drove him to the summit of present-day Phnom Kulen, about 50 kilometers east of Angkor, where he declared independence. Jacques suggests that this step might have been intended to affirm Jayavarman's authority in the face of strong resistance.

Once established in the Angkor region, Jayavarman II appears to have reigned not only in Hariharalaya, located just north of the Tonle Sap lake, but also at a place that inscriptions call Amarendrapura. It has not been identified, though some historians believe it to be a now lost settlement at the western end of the West Baray, the eight kilometer-long holy reservoir that was built about two centuries after his death. No single temple is associated with Jayavarman, but some historians suggest he may have built Ak Yum, a brick stepped pyramid, now largely ruined, at the southern edge of the West Baray. The temple was a forerunner to the mountain-temple architectural form of later Khmer kings.

Despite his key role in Khmer history, few firm facts survive about Jayavarman. No inscriptions authored by him have been found, but he is mentioned in numerous others, some of them written long after his death. He appears to have been of aristocratic birth, beginning his career of conquest in the southeast of present-day Cambodia. He may have been known as Jayavarman Ibis at that time. "For the prosperity of the people in this perfectly pure royal race, great lotus which no longer has a stalk, he rose like a new flower," declares one inscription. Various other details are recounted in inscriptions: he married a woman named Hyang Amrita; and he dedicated a foundation at Lobok Srot, in the southeast.

== Death ==
Jayavarman II died in 850 CE and received the posthumous name of Parameshwara, "the supreme ruler", an epithet of Shiva. After him, the throne was held by his son Jayavarman III and two other kings of the family into which he had married. He was formally honored along with these two kings and their wives in the Preah Ko temple in Rolous, built by King Indravarman I and inaugurated in 880 CE.

== Sdok Kak Thom inscription and its interpretation ==
The most valuable inscription concerning Jayavarman II is the one dated to 1052 CE, two centuries after his death, found at the Sdok Kak Thom temple in present-day Thailand. The inscription states "When His Majesty Paramesvara came from Java to reign in the royal city of Indrapura,...Sivakaivalya, the family's purohit, was serving as his guru and held the post of royal chaplain to His Majesty," using the king's posthumous name. In a later passage, the text says that a brahmin named Hiranyadama, "proficient in the lore of magic power, came from Janapada in response to His Majesty's having invited him to perform a sublime rite which would release Kambujadeśa [the kingdom] from being any longer subject to Java." The text also recounts the creation of the cult of the devaraja, the key religious ceremony in the court of Jayavarman and subsequent Khmer people.

=== Interpretations on Java ===
The word in the inscription that has often been translated as "Java" has caused endless debate. Some early scholars, such as George Coedès and Lawrence Palmer Briggs, have established the notion that it refers to the island of Java in present-day Indonesia. The mythical stories of battles between the Khmers and Javanese correspond in their view to the Shailendra dynasty that ruled both Java and Sumatran Srivijaya.

Later scholars such as Charles Higham doubt that the word refers to the island. Michael Vickery has re-interpreted the word to mean "the Chams", the Khmers' neighbors to the east, described a chvea.

Other scholars like Takashi Suzuki suggest that "Java" is on the Malaysia Peninsula instead, or particularly Kedah which has been the center of Srivijaya's realm under Sailendra.

== Historical assessment and legacy ==
It is debated as to whether Jayavarman II's rule truly represented a seminal turning point in Khmer history, the creation of an independent unified state from small feuding principalities, or was instead part of a long process toward that end. Inscriptions indicate that later Khmer kings treated him as the august first in their line and font of their own legitimacy, but Hindu civilization had existed already for centuries in the region; the fact that Jayavarman was the second monarch to carry that name is a sign that there was already long line of kings of significant states in the region.

Saloth Sâr ("Pol Pot"), viewed the achievements of Jayavarman II and the Angkorian civilization as proof of the inherent greatness of the Khmer people. The Khmer Rouge ideology was a blend of Marxism-Leninism and intense nationalism, aiming to restore the perceived former glory of the Khmer Empire associated with Jayavarman II. Adopted on 5 January 1976, the flag of Democratic Kampuchea (DK) featured a yellow, three-towered temple—representing Angkor Wat, incorporating Angkorian imagery into the regime's national symbolism. However, the political and religious system of Jayavarman II's era was fundamentally different from the ideology of the Khmer Rouge.

== Notes ==
Jayavarman II Emperor of Angkor Born: 770 Died: 850
Preceded by Bosakak Reach	Khmer Empire; 802–835	Succeeded by Jayavarman III
