= Buddhist kingship =

Buddhist beliefs and practices about kingship

Buddhist kingship refers to the beliefs and practices with regard to kings and queens in traditional Buddhist societies, as informed by Buddhist teachings. This is expressed and developed in Pāli and Sanskrit literature, early, later, as well as vernacular, and evidenced in epigraphic findings. Forms of kingship that could be described as Buddhist kingship existed at least from the time of Emperor Aśoka the Great (Pali: Asoka) and Kanishka. Important concepts that were used with regard to Buddhist kingship are merit (Sanskrit: puṇya; Pali: puñña), pāramī (Sanskrit: pāramitā; Thai: บารมี), 'person of merit' (Thai: ผู้มีบุญ), 'wheel-turning monarch' (Pali: Cakkavatti; Sanskrit: Cakravartin), and Bodhisatta (Sanskrit: Bodhisattva). Many of these beliefs and practices continue to inspire and inform current kingship in contemporary Buddhist countries. Since the 2000s, studies have also began to focus on the role of Buddhist queens in Asian history.

== Origins ==
In a traditional Buddhist society such as Thailand, the king's role in society and position in the hierarchy was defined by Buddhist cosmography, which considered someone's role and position the result of karma accumulated throughout many lifetimes. In the Tipiṭaka (Sanskrit: Tripitaka; Buddhist scriptures), ideas about good governance are framed in terms of the ideal of the Cakkavati, the king who rules righteously and non-violently according to Dharma. His roles and duties are discussed extensively, especially in the Mahasudassana Sutta and the Cakkavatti-sihanada Sutta. The Cakkavatti must be a moral example to the people and possess enough spiritual merit and wisdom. It is through this that he earns his sovereignty, as opposed to merely inheriting it. Moreover, he is described to significantly affect society's morals.

Apart from the Tipitaka, Pāli chronicles such as the Mahāvaṃsa and the Jinakālamālī have contributed to ideas of Buddhist kingship. Also, the Buddha himself was born as a prince, and was also a king (Vessantara) in a previous life. Moreover, the Emperor Aśoka is featured in the later Pāli works as an important patron supporting the Sangha. In traditional chronicles, many of the kings mentioned in later Pāli works were considered part of the same dynasty. This dynasty of meritorious kings stretched back until the beginning of the current aeon (Pali: kappa; Sanskrit: kalpa), and in vernacular Pāli works and pre-modern traditions, the kings of Buddhist societies were linked to the same dynasty, through "ties of incarnation." Kings in Buddhist societies identified themselves with traditional kings in Buddhist texts, and this identification was expressed through discourse and ritual.

== Kingship and merit-making ==
In South and Southeast Asia, kingship and merit-making were not mutually exclusive. Merit-making was not only a practice for the masses, but was also practiced by royalty. In vernacular Pāli works, examples are given of royalty performing meritorious acts, sometimes as a form of repentance for previously committed wrongdoings.

Because of these traditions, kings have had an important role in maintaining the Sangha, and publicly performed grand acts of merit-making, as testified by epigraphic evidence from South and Southeast Asia. In Sri Lanka, from the tenth century CE onward, kings have taken on the role of lay protectors of the Sangha, including Thai kings, during the periods of Sukhothai and Ayutthaya (14th-18th centuries). In fact, a number of kings in Sri Lanka, Thailand, and Burma have described themselves as "Bodhisattas." Epithets and Buddhist terminology within royal language were established accordingly. The accumulation of merit in past lives has been attributed to kings' rise to power, and is captured in the Burmese and Thai sociological concepts of hpone and barami respectively, both of which have endured in the modern era.

== Vessantara Jātaka ==
In the last seven centuries in Thailand, the Vessantara Jātaka has played a significant role in legitimating kingship in Thailand, through a yearly festival known as the 'Preaching of the Great Life' (Thai: เทศน์มหาชาติ). Merit-making and pāramīs were greatly emphasized in this festival, through the story about Prince Vessantara's generosity. Initially, the festival was an important way for the Chakri dynasty to legitimate itself, as Vessantara was the model prince who became king through the power of his merits and sacrifice. During the reform period of Rama IV, however, as Thai Buddhism was being modernized, the festival was dismissed as not reflecting true Buddhism. Its popularity has greatly diminished ever since. Nevertheless, the use of merit-making by the Thai monarchy and government to solidify their position and create unity in society has continued until the twenty-first century.

== Kingship and ordination ==
Some kings' role as exemplary Buddhist was exemplified by their ordination prior to being enthroned. A well-known example of this was the Thai king Mongkut, who ordained twenty-seven years before becoming king. King Mongkut emphasized a rational approach of Buddhism, which could be reconciled with science. This approach helped him to legitimate his position as a king. Part of the Coronation of the Thai monarch includes the king proceeding to the chapel royal (the Wat Phra Kaew) to vow to be a "Defender of the Faith" in front of a chapter of monks including the Supreme Patriarch of Thailand.

== As a topic of conversation ==
The Buddha discouraged monks from conversation about kings and ministers of state.

== See also ==
- Ashoka
- Chakravarti
- Humane King Sutra
- Dasavidha-rājadhamma
- Devaraja
- Philosopher king
