= Jeannine Auboyer =

French curator

Jeannine Auboyer (1912—1990) was a French Indologist and art historian specialising in the classical arts of South and Southeast Asia. From 1965 to 1980 she was the chief-curator of the Musée Guimet in Paris.

Jeannine Auboyer was the daughter of an auctioneer. During her secondary education, she received painting and sculpture lessons at Académie Julian and Académie de la Grande Chaumière. From 1929 to 1934 she studied at the École du Louvre, where she specialized in art history of the Indian world (with Joseph Hackin, René Grousset, Philippe Stern) and the Far East. She also took courses at the École pratique des hautes études (EPHE; with Paul Pelliot, Jean Przyluski, Paul Mus), the Institut d'Art et d'Archéologie, the Institute of Indian Civilisation as well as the Ethnological Institute at the Sorbonne University of Paris (with Marcel Mauss and Paul Rivet).

In 1931, at the age of 19, Auboyer startet working at the Indochinese Museum at Trocadéro Palace under Philippe Stern. Its collections were transferred to the Musée Guimet by 1936, where Auboyer subsequently worked under the directorship of Joseph Hackin. From 1942 to 1946, she was a staff member at the Musée Cernuschi. At the EPHE, she defended her dissertation on "The Throne and its Symbolism in Ancient India" in 1946. Back at the Musée Guimet, she rose from assistant to curator in 1952. In 1965, she finally replaced Philippe Stern as chief-curator. She initiated a general renovation of the museum in the late 1960s, which was completed by the end of her tenure. Upon her retirement in 1980, she received the title of honorary chief-curator. In parallel, she taught at the École du Louvre, where she held the chair of Art of the Indian World from 1965 to 1980.

In addition, she was also a researcher at the French National Centre for Scientific Research where she directed the Centre for Iconography of the Indian World. She made several archaeological expeditions to India, Nepal, Cambodia and Thailand. Auboyer wrote numerous works on Indian and Southeast Asian history and art. She is known for Daily Life in Ancient India (French: La Vie quotidienne dans l'Inde ancienne; published in 1961 and translated to English in 1968), a record of the ancient Indian rituals and customs, many of which are preserved in Indian society today.
