= Indrapura (Khmer) =

Last capital of the Lower Chenla

- ឥន្ទ្របុរៈ (Khmer)
- Amarendrapura (អមរិន្ទ្របុរៈ)
- Location in Cambodia
- 12.0014°N 105.4485°E
- Periods: Middle Ages
- Location: Kampong Cham, Cambodia
- Region: Southeast Asia

History
- Built: 781 AD
- Built by: Jayavarman II
- Abandoned: late 8th century AD

Site notes
- Architectural style: Banteay Prei Nokor
- Condition: restored and ruined
- Public access: Yes

According to inscription on the stele of Sdok Kok Thom, Indrapura (Khmer: ឥន្ទ្របុរៈ) or Amarendrapura (Khmer: អមរិន្ទ្របុរៈ) was the first capital of Jayavarman II reign about 781, before the foundation of Khmer Empire in 802.

== Location ==
George Coedes and Claude Jacques identified it with Banteay Prei Nokor, near Kompong Cham, Cambodia, while Michael Vickery assumes it was closer to Kompong Thom. Some scholars have proposed Ak Yum as the center of Amarendrapura.
