= Dasavidha-rājadhamma =

Buddhist dhamma

Dasavidha-rājadhamma ("tenfold virtue of the ruler") is one of the Buddhist dhamma that rulers of people, organisations, companies, offices, countries or other organs are purposed to hold. It could be found in Sutta, Khuddakanikāya, Jātaka, stating:

Dānaṁ sīlaṁ pariccāgaṁ ājjavaṁ maddavaṁ tapaṁ
akkodaṁ avihiṁsañca khantiñca avirodhanaṁ

== Composition ==
Dasavidha-rājadhamma composes of:

1. Dāna (charity) – being prepared to sacrifice one's own pleasure for the well-being of the public, such as giving away one's belongings or other things to support or assist others, including giving knowledge and serving public interests.

2. Sīla (morality) – practicing physical and mental morals, and being a good example of others.

3. Pariccāga (altruism) – being generous and avoiding selfishness, practicing altruism.

4. Ājjava (honesty) – being honest and sincere towards others, performing one's duties with loyalty and sincerity to others.

5. Maddava (gentleness) – having gentle temperament, avoiding arrogance and never defaming others.

6. Tapa (self controlling) – destroying passion and performing duties without indolence.

7. Akkodha (non-anger) – being free from hatred and remaining calm in the midst of confusion.

8. Avihimsa (non-violence) – exercising non-violence, not being vengeful.

9. Khanti (forbearance) – practicing patience, and trembling to serve public interests.

10. Avirodhana (uprightness) – respecting opinions of other persons, avoiding prejudice and promoting public peace and order.

== History ==
Historically, there is a man who exemplifies the tenfold virtue of the ruler, namely King Asoka (304–232 BCE), who ruled India for forty-one years.

Initially, the King was a great warrior general, winning many battles, and continued to expand the Indian empire during the first eight years of his reign. After one particularly bloody, but victorious, campaign, the King took in the sight of the battleground, and seeing the carnage all around him, famously cried out, "What have I done?".

Following this, he embraced Buddhism, establishing a just kingdom along Buddhist lines and was known as 'Dhammasoka' or "Asoka, the holder of dhamma". He promoted wildlife protection, banning hunting for sport, built universities, hospitals for people and animals, and constructed irrigation systems for trade and agriculture. The King also renounced the use of violence, ceasing all military campaigns against his neighbors, instead sending monks and nuns abroad to spread the Buddhist Teachings on wisdom and kindness. Indeed, a son and daughter of King Asoka’s who were monk and nun took Buddhism to Sri Lanka, where it remains the predominant faith to this day.

This is not to say that he promoted Buddhism at the expense of other religions, however, as he also encouraged tolerance and understanding between different creeds and ethnic groups. King Asoka is remembered by Buddhists and non-Buddhists alike as an example of a truly compassionate and just ruler, who lived according to the tenfold virtue of the ruler.

== See also ==
- Buddhist kingship
- Edicts of Ashoka
- Philosopher king
- Political ethics
