= Jean Boisselier =

French archaeologist and art historian

- Born: 26 August 1912; Paris, France
- Died: 26 February 1996 (aged 83); Paris, France
- Education: École nationale supérieure des Beaux-Arts, École du Louvre
- Occupations: Archaeologist; art historian; ethnologist
- Awards: Prix de l'Académie française

Jean Boisselier (26 August 1912 – 26 February 1996) was a French archaeologist, ethnologist, and art historian. He was a specialist on Khmers and a researcher focused on Buddhist thought and iconography. As a member of the École française d'Extrême-Orient (EFEO), he was responsible for the restoration of Angkor.

== Biography ==
Boisselier was born in Paris, son of the military illustrator Henri Boisselier and grandson of an architect. He discovered his vocation for Southeast Asian art in front of an illustration of Angkor Wat temple, during his visit to the Exposition coloniale de Marseille in 1922. He attended the École nationale supérieure des Beaux-Arts in 1924, where he followed the courses taught by Paul Bellugue. He then became a drawing teacher with the hope of joining the School of Cambodian Arts.

At the beginning of the World War II, he served as a reserve officer. In June 1940, he was taken prisoner by Germans. During his captivity, he kept contacts with the Guimet Museum and gave lectures of drawing and history of Khmer art. Upon his return to France after being released in 1945, he followed the courses given by Philippe Stern at the École du Louvre, where he graduated with a dissertation on the evolution of Khmer statuary.

In 1949, Boisselier travelled to Angkor to assist Henri Marchal for the conservation of Khmer monuments. He remained with Marchal only a few months, in 1950, he was appointed curator of the Museum of Phnom Penh where he set up a programme of restoration. After being a delegate of the École française d'Extrême-Orient in Cambodia in 1951, he was responsible for the scientific direction of the conservation work of Angkor in 1953. In 1955, he took part in the transfer of the management of the museum and the Buddhist Institute to the Cambodian authorities. He then left Cambodia for Thailand, where he discovered some murals from large pagodas, and studied the ancient city site of U Thong and the Dvaravati period.

Back in Paris, he resigned from the EFEO to join the Centre national de la recherche scientifique (CNRS). From 1964, he resumed specific missions in Thailand, where he gave numerous lectures at the Silpakorn University and participated in the excavations of Dambegoda in Buttala Divisional Secretariat, Sri Lanka. From 1970 to 1980, he was director of the research works concerning India, Orient and Africa for the Unité d'enseignement et de recherche (UER) and the research training programme "Archaeology and Civilisations of the South and Southeast Asia" (Archéologie et civilisations de l'Asie du Sud et du Sud-Est) created at the University of Paris III. He was appointed Docteur Honoris Causa of the Silpakorn University in 1983.

He has published a number of works on Southeast Asian art and religion, including a pocket-sized book—La sagesse du Bouddha—for Gallimard's "Découvertes" collection, which has been translated into 14 languages, including English.

== Selected publications ==
- La statuaire khmère et son évolution. Saigon, EFEO (PEFEO, 37) 1955
- Tendances de l’Art khmer. Commentaires sur 24 chefs-d’œuvre du musée de Phnom Penh Paris, PUF (Publ. du musée Guimet, Bibliothèque de diffusion, 42) 1956
- La statuaire du Champa. Recherches sur les cultes et l’iconographie. Paris, EFEO (PEFEO, 54) 1963
- Asie du Sud-Est : I. Le Cambodge. Paris, Picard (Manuel d’archéologie d’Extrême-Orient, 1) 1966
- Notes sur l'art du bronze dans l'ancien Cambodge . Artibus Asiae 29/4. 1967
- La sculpture en Thaïlande. Fribourg, Office du Livre (Bibliothèque des Arts). 1974
- With Jean-Michel Beurdeley, La peinture en Thaïlande. Fribourg, Office du livre (Bibliothèque des Arts). 1976, deutsche Version: Malerei in Thailand. W. Kohlhammer, Stuttgart 1976, ISBN 3-17-002521-X
- Il Sud-Est asiatico. Turin, Storia Universale dell’ Arte. 1986
- La sagesse du Bouddha, collection « Découvertes Gallimard » (nº 194), série Religions. Éditions Gallimard, 1993, ISBN 9782070437504 (new editions in 2010, 2019)
  - UK edition – The Wisdom of the Buddha, 'New Horizons' series. Thames & Hudson, 1994
  - US edition – The Wisdom of the Buddha, "Abrams Discoveries" series. Harry N. Abrams, 1994
- Bouddha, collection "Albums Beaux Livres". Éditions Gallimard, 2013 (preface by Trinh Xuan Thuan; an adaptation of La sagesse du Bouddha)
