= Philippe Stern =

French art historian

Philippe Stern (11 April 1895 – 4 April 1979) was a French art historian specialising in Indian and Southeast Asian art, particularly from the Khmer Empire and Champa. He taught Indian and Southeast Asian art at the École du Louvre from 1929 to 1965 and was chief curator of the Guimet Museum in Paris from 1953 to 1965.

== Biography ==
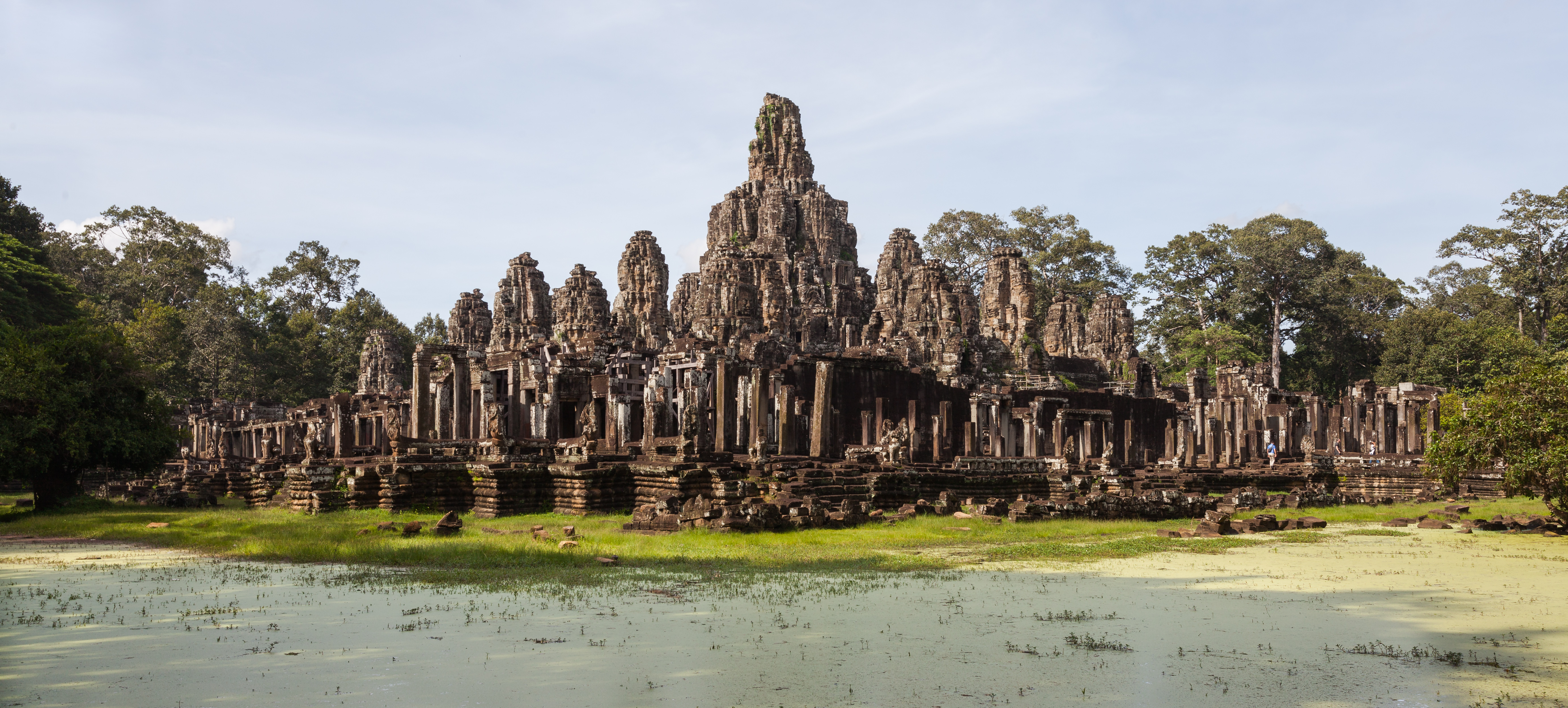
The Bayon of Angkor Thom was the subject of Stern's 1927 thesis on Khmer art

Stern first studied philosophy with Émile Chartier (Alain), then musicology and composition, before turning his attention to Indian and Khmer cultures. From 1921, he worked as an assistant at the Guimet Museum (Musée Guimet), and from 1925 as a curator at the Indochina Museum (Musée indochinois) in the Trocadéro Palace. At the École pratique des hautes études (EPHE) he completed his thesis on the Bayon of Angkor Thom and the development of Khmer art in 1927, which was considered groundbreaking for this field of study. George Cœdès wrote that with this work, "the study of Khmer archaeology has entered a new phase". Stern credited Cœdès as well as Joseph Hackin (director of the Musée Guimet) and Henri Parmentier (director of the archaeological service of the École française d'Extrême-Orient), as his principal academic patrons.

In the same year, he was appointed associate curator at the Guimet Museum. Together with Hubert Pernot, Stern set up the joint music library of the Paris Museum of Speech and Gesture (Musée de la parole et du geste) and the Guimet Museum in 1928. Besides his museum work, he became a lecturer at the École du Louvre in 1929, teaching Art of India and Indochina. Among his students were Jeannine Auboyer, Jean Marie Casal, Jean Boisselier and Subhadradis Diskul. Following Stern's initiative, most of the Khmer sculptures from the Indochina Museum at Trocadéro were transferred to the Musée Guimet. His only field research trip took him to Vietnam and Cambodia in 1936, where he took part in the excavations at Phnom Kulen. When France was occupied by Nazi Germany in the course of the Second World War in 1940, Stern was threatened with anti-Semitic persecution and fled to Toulouse in the "free zone" administered by the Vichy regime.

After the liberation of France in 1944, he married the photographer Thérèse le Prat (1895-1966), who was known for her pictures of Southeast Asia and Oceania. Following the death of René Grousset, Stern took over as chief curator of the Guimet Museum in 1953. When he retired in 1965, he was replaced by his former student and long-time colleague Jeannine Auboyer. He then continued to publish his research findings.

== Selected works ==
- Le Bàyon d'Angkor et l'évolution de l'art Khmer. Paris: Geuthner. 1927.
- L'art du Champa (ancien Annam) et son évolution. Paris: Adrien-Maisonneuve. 1942.
- Évolution du style Indien d'Amarāvatī. Paris: Presses universitaires de France. 1961. Co-authored with Mireille Bénisti.
- Les monuments Khmers du style du Bàyon et Jayavarman VII. Paris: Presses universitaires de France. 1965.
- Colonnes indiennes d'Ajantâ et d'Ellora: Évolution et répercussions; styles gupta et post-gupta. Paris: Presses universitaires de France. 1972.
- Beauté-clef. Bern: Lang. 1989.
- Touches d’atteinte. Bern: Lang. 1994.
