= West Baray =

Body of water in Cambodia

- Baray Teuk Thla
- បារាយណ៍ខាងលិច (Khmer)
- Location within Cambodia Location within Asia
- Location: Angkor
- Coordinates: 13°26′N 103°48′E
- Basin countries: Cambodia
- Average depth: 4 m (13 ft)

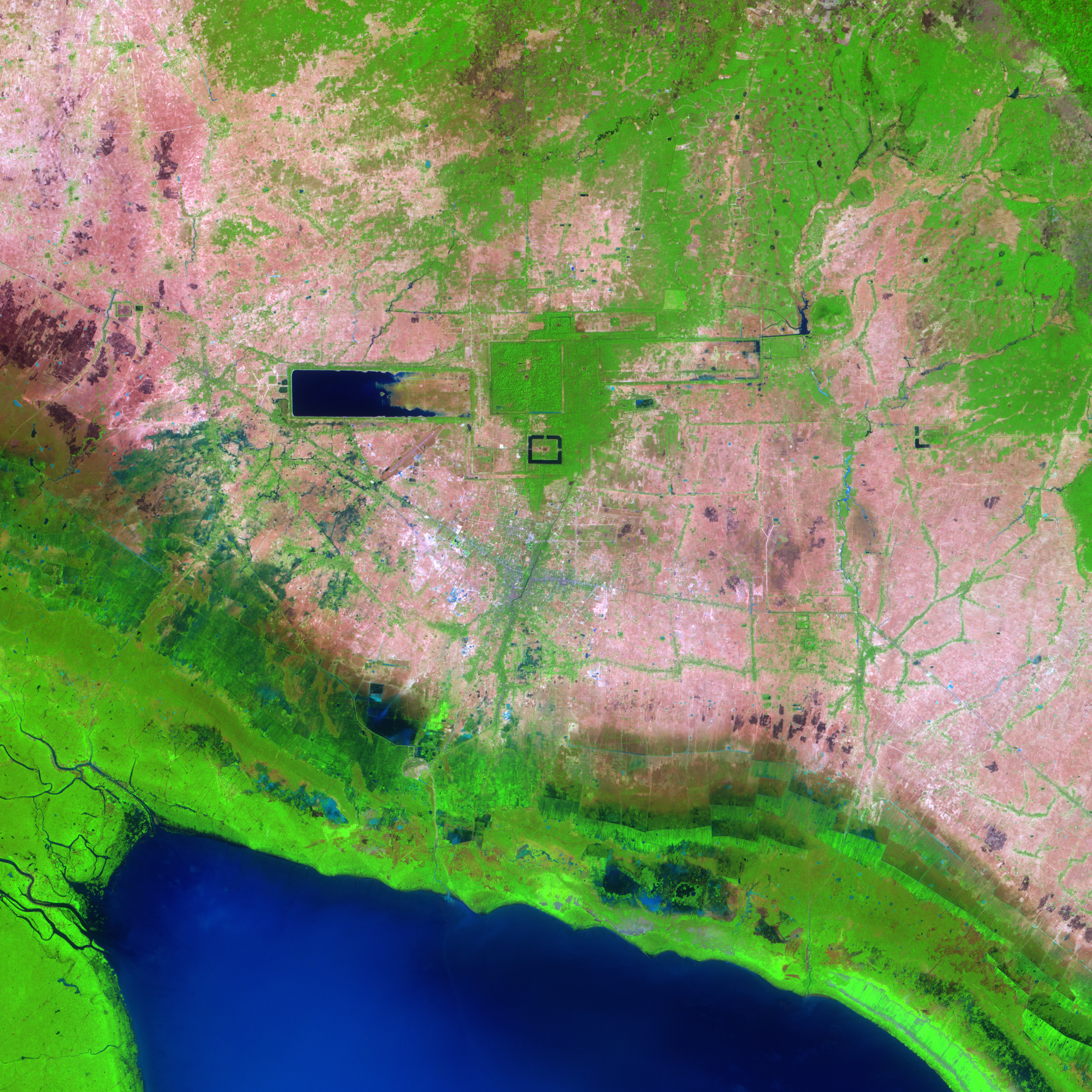
simulated natural color image acquired on February 17, 2004 by the Advanced Spaceborne Thermal Emission and Reflection Radiometer (ASTER) on NASA’s Terra satellite

The West Baray (Khmer: បារាយណ៍ខាងលិច, UNGEGN: Baréayôn Khang Lĭch, ALA-LC: Pārāyaṇ ̊ Khang Lic [ɓaraːj kʰaːŋ ləc]) or Baray Teuk Thla (Khmer: បារាយណ៍ទឹកថ្លា, UNGEGN: Baréayôn Tœ̆k Thla, ALA-LC: Pārāyaṇ ̊ Dẏk Thlā [ɓaraːj tək tʰlaː]; "Clear Water Reservoir") is a baray, or reservoir, at Angkor, Cambodia, oriented east–west and located just west of the walled city Angkor Thom. Rectangular in shape and measuring approximately 7.8 by 2.1 kilometers, the West Baray is the largest baray at Angkor and one of the largest handcut water reservoirs on Earth, possessing a current maximum capacity of 53 million cubic meters of water (14 billion gallons). Its waters are contained by tall earthen dikes measuring 11.9 meters in height. In the center of the baray is the West Mebon, a Hindu temple built on an artificial island.

Construction of the baray probably began in the 11th century during the reign of King Suryavarman I and was finished later under King Udayadityavarman II.

The Angkorian engineers who created the West Baray appear to have in places incorporated earlier construction. The east dike, for instance, appears to be largely a section of a dike that enclosed the capital city of King Yasovarman, which had the Phnom Bakheng temple at its center. In other places, the baray obliterated or submerged earlier human-made sites. The south dike, for instance, partially buried a brick pyramid temple, Ak Yum. And the western floor of the baray appears to have once been inhabited—archeological work has found wall bases, steps, and pottery shards there. An inscription stele discovered in the area, dating from 713 CE, offers further evidence of earlier settlement, defining rice fields that were offered to a queen Jayadevi.

Early French experts believed the West Baray to have functioned as a vast holding tank for water that fed irrigation canals in dry times, allowing multiple crops of rice each year. Many later studies, however, theorize that the baray had mainly symbolic functions, serving as a vast earthly depiction of the Hindu Sea of Creation, with the West Mebon temple at its center.

In modern times, an irrigation lock was built in the baray's southern dike, raising the water level and allowing provision of water to fields to the south. Today the baray retains water in its western end year-round. In the rainy season, water advances to the eastern dike.

With clear, still waters, the baray today is a popular place for swimming and boat rides by local residents. It has occasionally served as a landing site for seaplanes.
