= Mahendraparvata =

Mahendraparvata មហេន្ទ្របវ៌ត
- Archaeological site
- Location in Cambodia
- Coordinates: 13°36′46″N 104°6′45″E
- Country: Cambodia
- Province: Siem Reap Province
- Founded: 802 AD

Mahendraparvata (Khmer: មហេន្ទ្របវ៌ត) is an ancient city of the Khmer Empire era in Cambodia. The existence of the city has been known for decades, but much of it lay concealed by forest and earth. The city was uncovered by an archaeological expedition led by Jean-Baptiste Chevance and Damian Evans in 2012 with the aid of airborne laser scanning technology called LIDAR.

== Etymology ==
The name Mahendraparvata means "Mountain of the Great Indra". It is derived from the Sanskrit words महेन्द्र (Great Indra, a title of the Hindu god Indra) and पर्वत (mountain) and is a reference to the sacred mountain site commonly known today as Phnom Kulen, where Jayavarman II was consecrated as the first king of the Khmer Empire in 802. The name is attested in inscriptions on the Angkor-area Ak Yum temple.

== Location ==
Mahendraparvata is located 40 kilometres (25 mi) north of the Angkor Wat complex, 45 kilometres (28 mi) north of Siem Reap, on the slopes of Phnom Kulen mountain in Siem Reap Province.

== Expedition ==
The multi-year archaeological expedition to find Mahendraparvata was co-led by Damian Evans of University of Sydney and Jean-Baptiste Chevance of London's Archaeology and Development Foundation. The team announced their initial findings in June 2013. A key feature of the expedition was its use of helicopter-mounted Lidar technology to scan the Phnom Kulen area and then map the city layout. The scanning phase involved seven days of helicopter operations. The Lidar results confirmed ground-based research by previous archaeologists. But, according to Chevance, before this they "didn't know how all the dots fitted, exactly how it all came together".

The ground phase of the expedition traversed goat tracks and watery bogs, the team having got to their starting point by motorbike. Hazards included landmines. They initially uncovered five new temples. Eventually, using the Lidar data, thirty previously unidentified temples were discovered. In addition to the temples, their research showed the existence of an elaborate grid-like network of roads, dykes and ponds forming the city. Dr. Evans also noted that expedition imagery shows that the area became deforested, and he theorises that the impact of this, and water management issues, led to the civilisation's decline.

== History ==
The expedition team have dated Mahendraparvata's origins to 802 CE. Thus the city predates Angkor Wat by about 350 years.

The city's origins date to the reign of Jayavarman II, considered the founder of the Khmer Empire. His reign was consecrated on the sacred mountain of Mahendraparvata, known as Phnom Kulen in contemporary Cambodian. The city he founded at Mahendraparvata was one of three capitals, or courts, of Jayavarman II's reign, the others being Amarendrapura and Hariharalaya.

The 1936 expedition of French archaeologist and art historian Philippe Stern had also explored the Phnom Kulen highlands. He discovered some previously unknown temples and Vishnu statues and described the area as the first true temple mountain. But the area, while being the source of rivers flowing south to the Tonle Sap, was remote. Later in his reign, Jayavarman II moved to Hariharalaya where he died in 835 CE.

== Bibliography ==
- Higham, Charles (2001). The Civilization of Angkor. University of California Press. ISBN 978-0-52023-442-0.
