= Banteay Prey Nokor =

Archaeological site in Cambodia

- បន្ទាយព្រៃនគរ
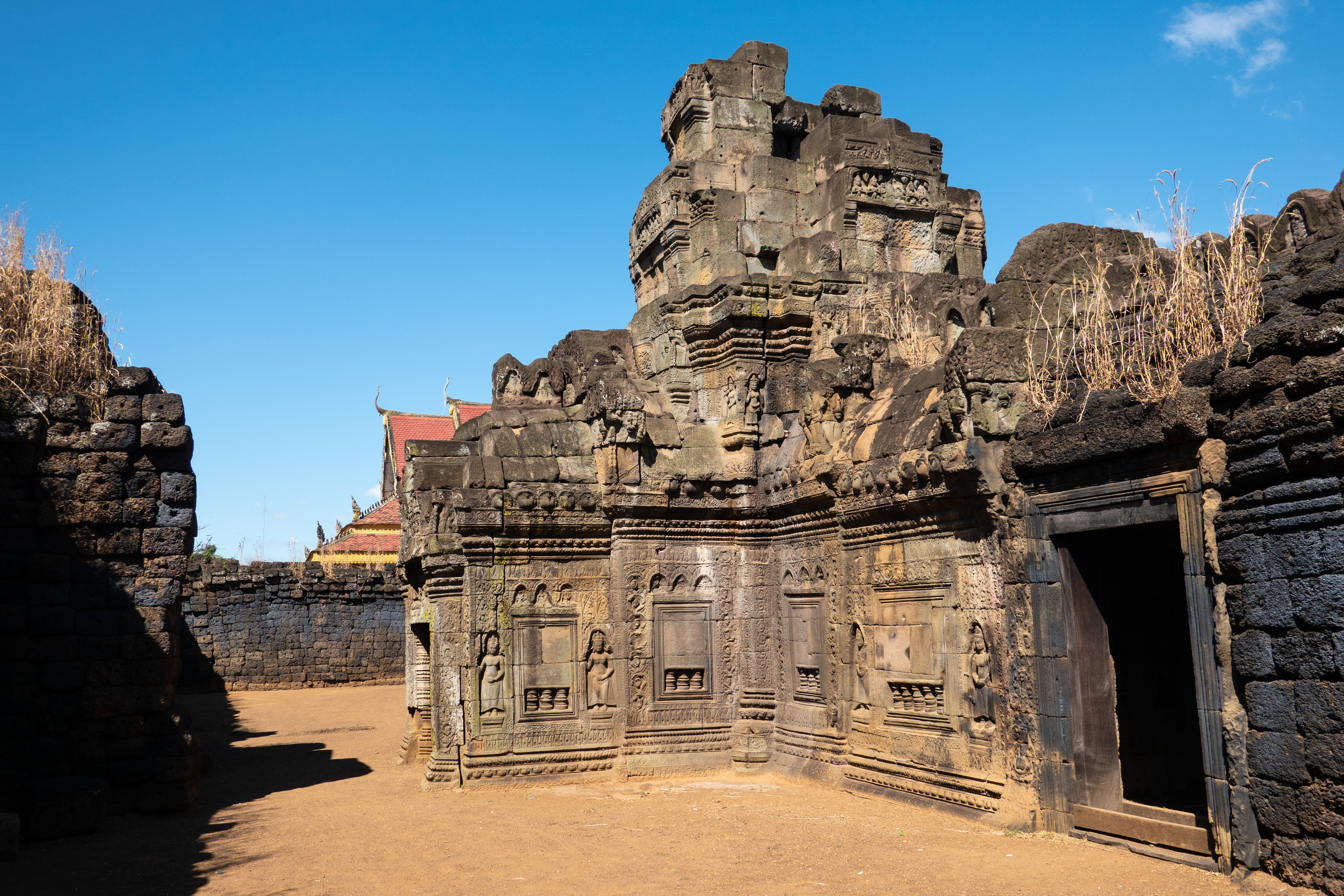

- Location within Cambodia

Religion
- Affiliation: Buddhism
- District: Kampong Siem District
- Province: Kampong Cham province

Location
- Country: Cambodia
- Interactive map of Banteay Prey Nokor
- Coordinates: 12.0014172791576°N 105.44854582064596°E

Architecture
- Creator: Suryavarman II
- Completed: 11th century

Banteay Prei Nokor (Khmer: បន្ទាយព្រៃនគរ) is an ancient Buddhist temple complex in the northwest of Kompong Cham, Cambodia.

Known locally as temple of "Wat Nokor in Khum of Kompong Siem", or "Wat Angkor", around 2 km from the provincial capital Kampong Cham (city). though a sign at the entrance now officially designates the name of the temple as Nokor Bachey Temple (Khmer: ប្រាសាទនគរបាជ័យ).

== Layout ==
The complex faces east at a bearing of 84.5°E, and covers 15ha. the site is composed of an outer rectangular laterite wall approximately 420x370m, an inner wall approximately 100x130m. A large reservoir or Baray (Khmer: បារាយណ៍) some 950 meters long and 480 meters wide is located 350 meters east of the site. Now abandoned, the reservoir area was used in the mid 20th century as a hippodrome, evidence of which can still be seen by visitors.

== History ==
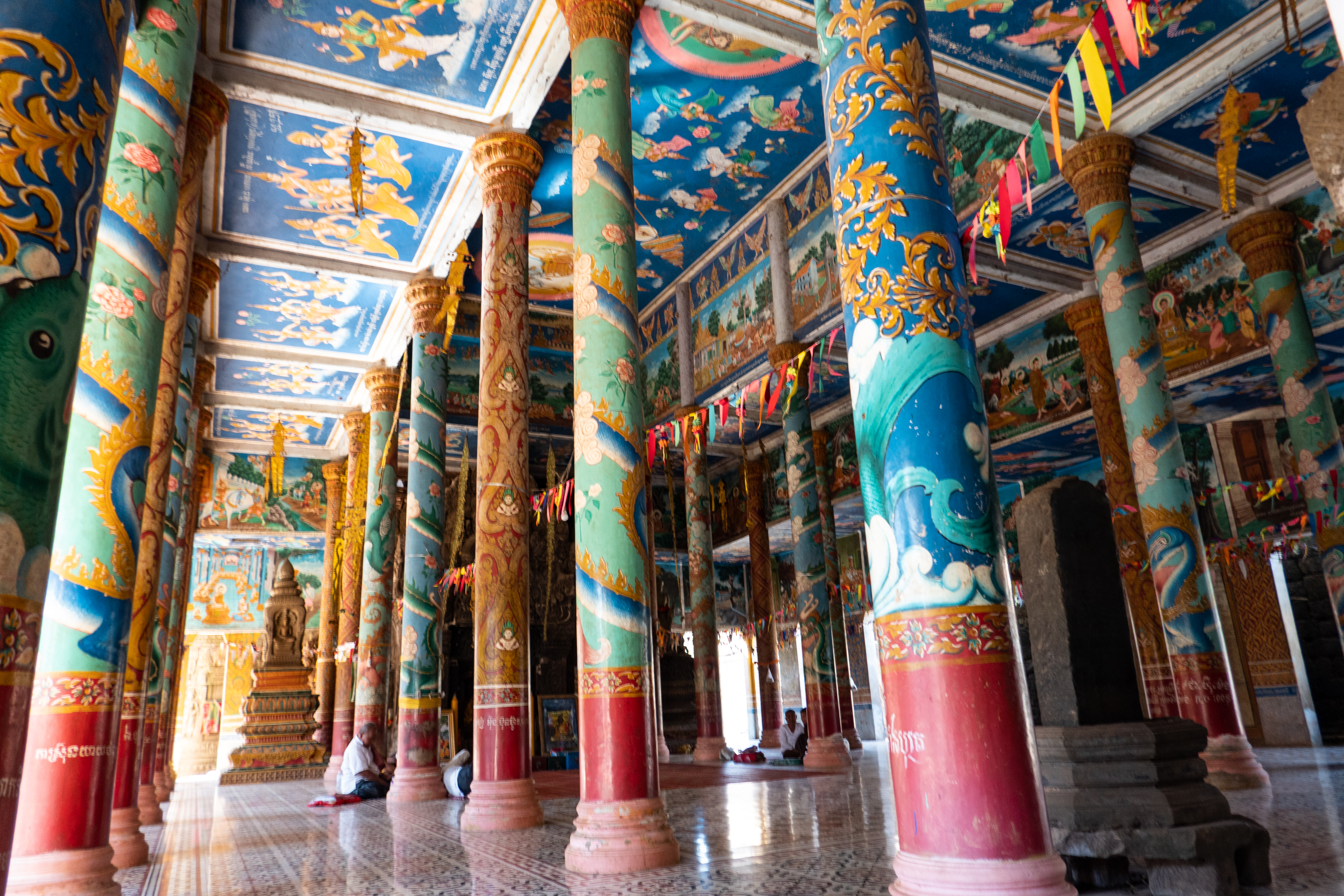
The interior of the Nokor Bachey Pagoda

The monument was built out of sandstone and laterite, and dates from the last years of the reign of Jayavarman VII. It is composed of a central tower surrounded by four laterite wall enclosures. The central tower of the temple of Wat Nokor is decorated with motifs characteristic of Bayon with Buddhist scenes on the pediments.

The temple complex is believed to have been the headquarters of Jayavarman VII for a time, from where he extended his influence over nearby principalities.

It has a number of distinguishing characteristics other than the fact that it is the largest ancient temple complex in Kampong Cham Province. One of these characteristics alludes to the fact that it is built of black sandstone, which causes it to stand out from other temples of the period which are often built of brick or reddish sandstone. The temple has an inscription which is open to visitors to see (and even touch) in the central pavilion. Wat Nokor Bachey boasts a 'Chartres' effect in which a more modern temple of a very different style has been built over and around the original Angkorian structure creating a blend of architectural styles.

There are many legends surrounding the origin of the temple but the most popular one has Oedipal overtones. According to this legend, the temple was built by a king who accidentally killed his father and married his mother. As recounted in the Greek legend, this king was put out by his father after a seer told him that his son would kill him. The son, however, did not die and returned to his kingdom not knowing that his father was the king. After quarreling on the road, the son killed the king and married his queen who was his mother. Upon discovering his crime, the young man built Wat Nokor in penance for his crime.

== World Heritage status ==
This site was once added to the UNESCO World Heritage Tentative List on September 1, 1992 in the Cultural category; however, in 2022 the Cambodian Government decided to withdraw the site from the Tentative List.

The temples includes many valuable statues and more modern additions, such as the representation of Dam Din.
