= Svay Leu District =

Svay Leu ស្រុកស្វាយលើ
- District (srok)
- District location in Siem Reap Province
- Coordinates: 13°41′30.05″N 104°16′28.06″E
- Country: Cambodia
- Province: Siem Reap
- Time zone: +7
- Geocode: 1713

Svay Leu District is a district of Siem Reap Province, in north western Cambodia. According to the 1998 census of Cambodia, it had a population of 12,869.

== Administrative divisions ==
Svay Leu DistrictIs a district in Siem Reap Province. The district has 5 communes and 28 villages.

Code Commune	Commune	Language Khmer	ភូមិ (Village)
១៧១៣០១	Boeng Mealea	ឃុំបឹងមាលា	បឹងមាលា(Boeng Mealea), ត្រពាំងប្ញស្សី(Trapeang Ruessei), ទឹកលិច(Tuek Lich), សក្តា(Sak Kda), ចាន់ហៀរ(Chan Hear), ទ័ពជ័យ(Torb Chey), ស្រែរបង(Srae Robong)
១៧១៣០២	Kantuot	ឃុំកន្ទួត	កន្ទួត(Kantuot), ខ្នារក្រៅ(Khnar Krau), អភិវឌ្ឍន៌(Akpiwat), រុងរឿង(Rong Roeung), សែនជ័យ(Senchey), ជប់រំដេង(Chub Rumdeng)
១៧១៣០៣	Khnang Phnum	ឃុំខ្នងភ្នំ	តាពេញ(Ta Penh), ខ្លាឃ្មុំ(Khla Khmum), ថ្មជ្រួញ(Thma Chruonh), សងែ្កឡាក់(Sangkae Lak), អន្លង់ធំ(Anlong Thum)
១៧១៣០៤	Svay Leu	ឃុំស្វាយលើ	ជប់លើ(Chob Leu), ជប់ក្រោម(Chob Kraom), ត្រពាំងខ្នារ(Trapeang Khnar), បិទផ្កា(Bet Phka), ឆេះចាន(Chhes Chan), ត្រពាំងស្វាយ(Trapeang Svay), អង្កាញ់(Angkanh), រំចេក(Rumchek), អូរមានជ័យ(Ou Meanchey), ថ្មី(Thmei)
១៧១៣០៥	Ta Siem	ឃុំតាសៀម	តាសៀម(Ta Siem), ដំបូកខ្ពស់(Dambouk Khpos), រហាល(Rohal), ត្រពាំងទឹម(Trapeang Tuem), ត្រពាំងពពេល(Trapeang Popel), ត្រពាំងថ្ម(Trapeang Thmar)
