= Baray =

Artificial body of water common to some architectural styles of Southeast Asia

Coordinates: 13.4342°N 103.8003°E

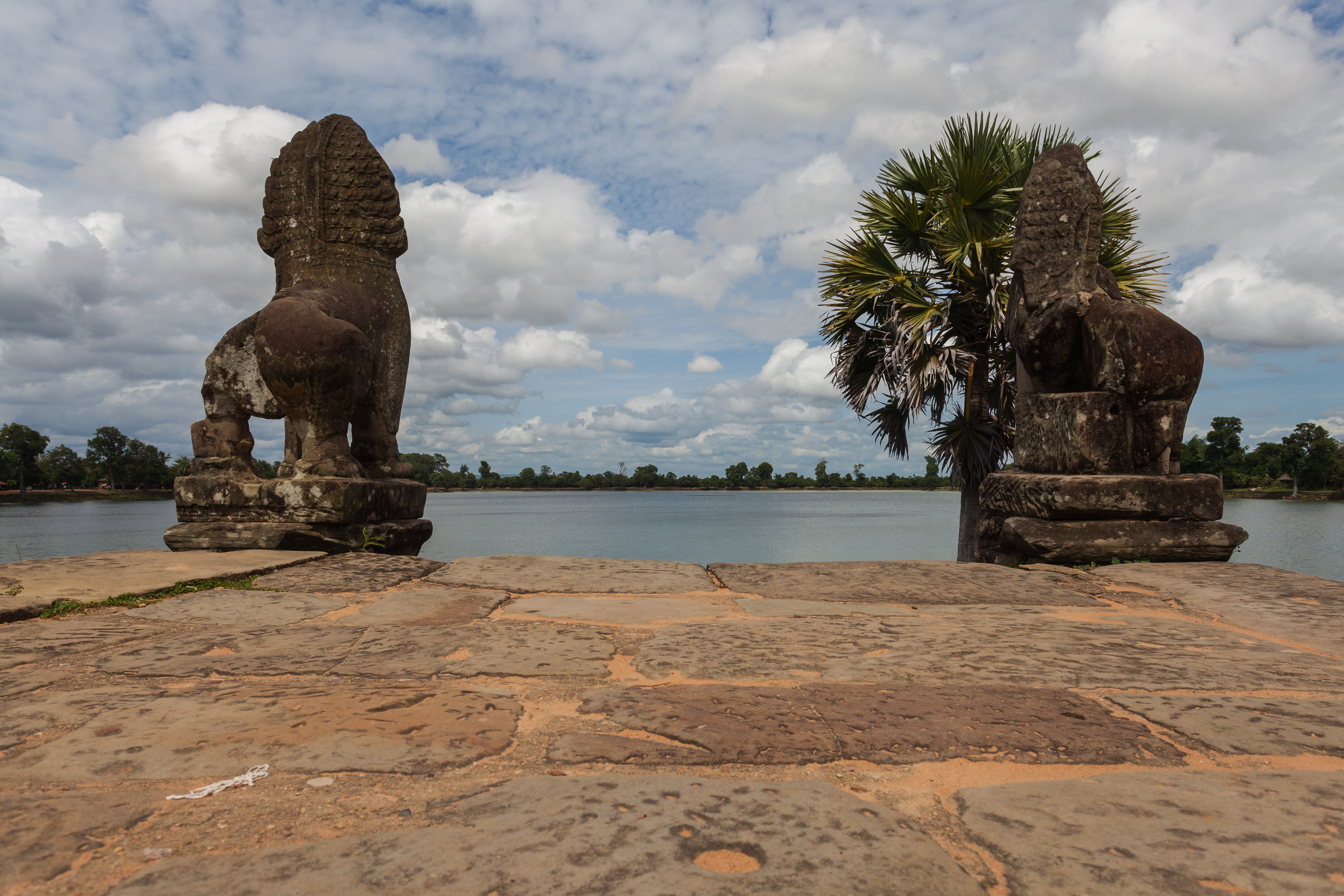
Baray Srah Srang.

A baray (Khmer: បារាយណ៍) is an artificial body of water which is a common element of the architectural style of the Khmer Empire of Southeast Asia. The largest are the East Baray and West Baray in the Angkor area, each rectangular in shape, oriented east–west and measuring roughly five by one and a half miles.

Historians are divided on the meaning and functions of barays. Some believe that they were primarily spiritual in purpose, symbolizing the Sea of Creation surrounding Mount Meru, font of the Hindu cosmos. Others have theorized that they were primarily practical, holding water for drinking and/or the irrigation of fields. It is possible that the function was a combination of these explanations, or others.

== See also ==
- Srah and baray
- Temple tank
