= Phnom Kulen =

Mountain range in northwestern Cambodia

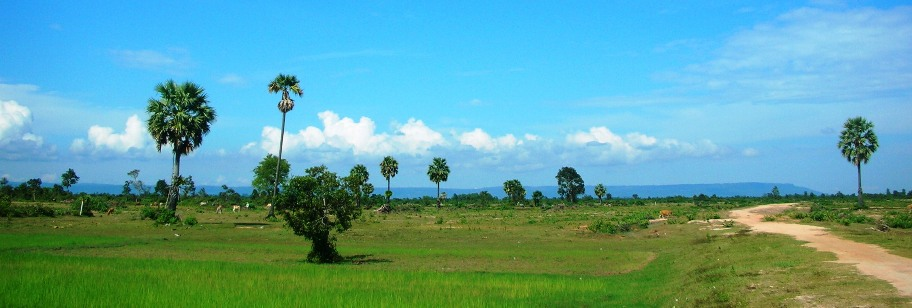
- Phnom Kulen appears as a long, continuous silhouette in the background

Highest point
- Elevation: 500 m (1,600 ft)
- Coordinates: 13.5798°N 104.2154°E

Naming
- Native name: ភ្នំគូលែន

Geography
- Location within Cambodia
- Location: Siem Reap Province, Cambodia

Geology
- Mountain type: sandstone

Climbing
- Easiest route: Drive

Phnom Kulen (or Kulen Mountain; Khmer: ភ្នំគូលែន, Phnum Kulên [pʰnom kuːlɛːn]; lit. 'Lychee Mountain') is a mountain range and a part of Phnom Kulen National Park in Siem Reap Province, Cambodia.

== Geography ==
Rather than a hill range, Phnom Kulen is an isolated chain of small mountain plateaux of moderate height lying south of the Dângrêk Mountains. The range stretches for about 40 kilometres (25 mi) in a WNW–ESE direction and is located some 48 kilometres (30 mi) north of Siem Reap.

The top of the plateau has a fairly consistent elevation, averaging 400 metres (1,300 ft) all along the range. Its highest point is approximately 500 metres (1,600 ft) according to topographic data from PeakVisor and Google Earth.

Geologically Phnom Kulen is formed of sandstone. It was important as a quarry in Angkorian times, the major quarries being located in the southeastern angle of the massif.

== Protected area ==
There is a sanctuary in the area, Phnom Kulen National Park, straddling the districts of Svay Leu and Va Rin. Its purpose is recreational and scientific in order to preserve the natural scenic features of Phnom Kulen mountain, like some famous waterfalls.

The park is located about 48 kilometres (30 mi) to the north of the provincial town of Siem Reap.

== Tentative List entry for World Heritage nomination ==
This site was added to Cambodia's national Tentative List for World Heritage on March 27, 2020 (originally proclaimed December 1, 1992), to be nominated under World Heritage criteria (iii) (iv) and (v). The effort continued in 2016 when over 300 families were removed from already crowded areas and existing facilities for tourists were upgraded.

== Description ==
The Phnom Kulen mountain range is located 30 kilometres (19 mi) northwards from Angkor Wat. Its name means "mountain of the lychees". There is a sacred hilltop site on top of the range.

Phnom Kulen is considered a holy mountain in Cambodia, of special religious significance to Hindus and Buddhists who come to the mountain in pilgrimage.

Near these mountains is Preah Ang Thom, a 16th-century Buddhist monastery notable for the giant reclining Buddha, the country's largest.

The Samré tribe was formerly living at the edge of Phnom Kulen, quarrying sandstone and transporting it to the royal sites.

== History ==
Phnom Kulen has major symbolic importance for Cambodia as the birthplace of the ancient Khmer Empire, for it was at Phnom Kulen that King Jayavarman II proclaimed independence from Java in 802 CE. Jayavarman II initiated the Devaraja cult of the king, a linga cult, in what is dated as 804 CE and declaring his independence from Java of whom the Khmer had been a vassal state. (Whether this is actually "Java", the Khmer chvea used to describe Champa, as well as the legend that he was earlier held as a ransom of the kingdom in Java. See Higham's The Civilization of Angkor for more information about the debate.) During the Angkorian era the relief was known as Mahendraparvata (the mountain of Great Indra).

Phnom Kulen was further developed under the rule of Udayadityavarman II, who made it the capital of his empire and constructed many temples and residences as well as the 1000 Lingas at Kbal Spean. At its peak, the Kulen development was larger than modern-day Phnom Penh and one of the largest cities in the 11th-century world. It would later be eclipsed by Angkor, but still served a vital role, as its water irrigated the entire region.

The Khmer Rouge used the location as a final stronghold as their regime came to an end in 1979 in the Cambodian–Vietnamese War.

== Sights ==
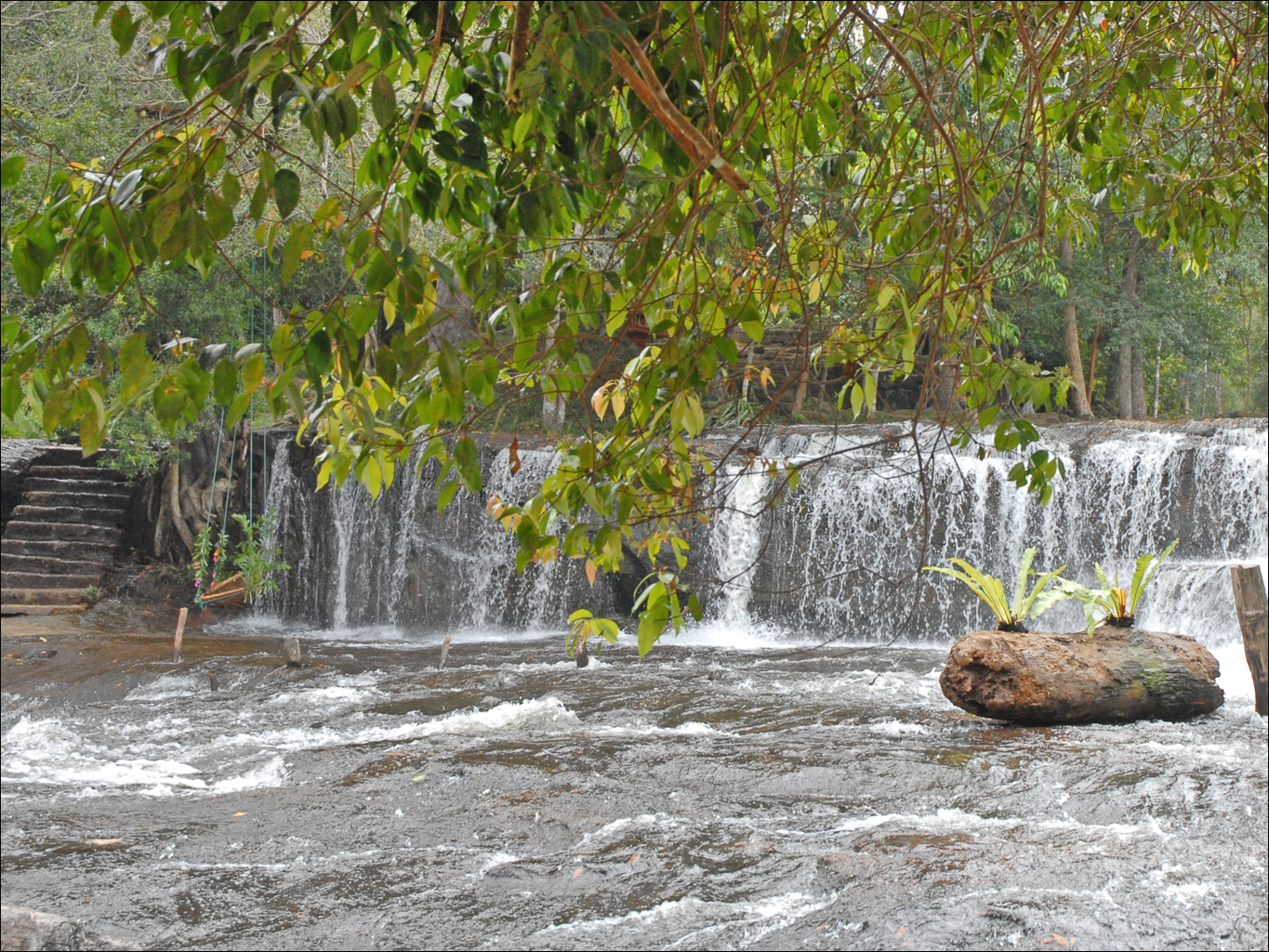
Waterfall at Phnom Kulen

Chup Preah is a stream flowing into the mountain's valley. Kulen Mountain has two waterfalls. The first is between 4–5 metres (13–16 ft) high and 20–25 metres (66–82 ft) wide. There is a shallow pond below it. The second waterfall is 15–20 metres (49–66 ft) high and 10–15 metres (33–49 ft) wide. This pours into a larger area of water which is popular to visit and swim in. These sizes apply to the dry and rainy seasons although the current will be weaker in the dry season.

Kbal Spean is known for its carvings representing fertility and its waters which hold special significance to Hindus. Just 5 centimetres (2.0 in) under the water's surface over 1000 small linga carvings are etched into the sandstone riverbed. The waters are regarded as holy, given that Jayavarman II chose to bathe in the river, and had the river diverted so that the stone bed could be carved. Carvings include a stone representation of the Hindu god Vishnu lying on his serpent Ananta, with his wife Lakshmi at his feet. A lotus flower protrudes from his navel bearing the god Brahma. The river then ends with a waterfall and a pool.

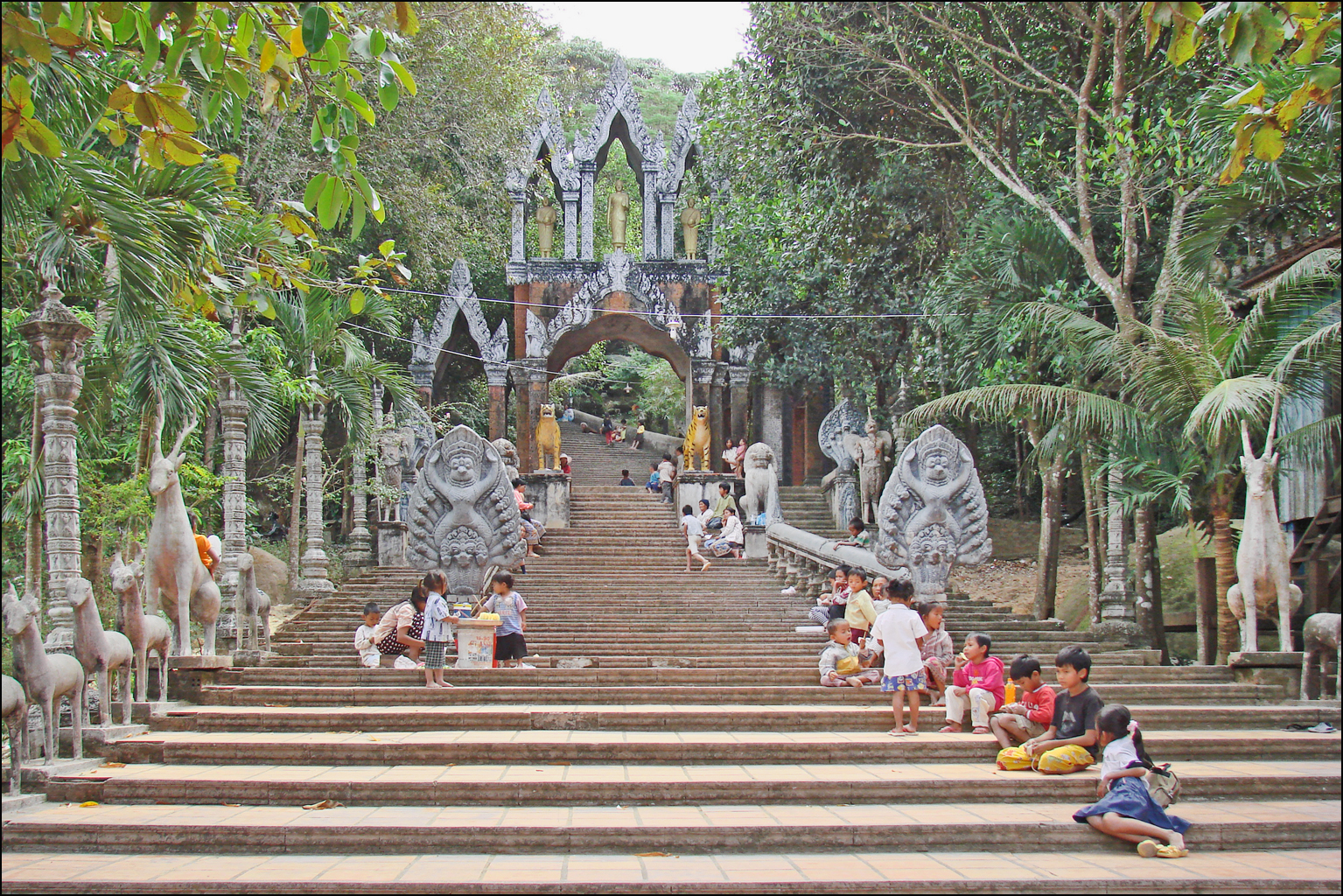
Stairway to Preah Ang Thom

Preah Ang Thom houses a large statue of Buddha. It was built in the 16th century and is 8 metres (26 ft) high. Preah Ang Thom is the sacred and worshipping god for Kulen Mountain. There are also two large Cham Pa trees nearby. Besides Preah Ang Thom, Chhok Ruot, footprints of Preah Bat Choan Tuk, Peung Chhok, Peung Ey So and Peung Ey Sey, can also be seen.

The Linga is along the river of Siem Reap and has a lot of figures of Yoni and Linga spreading out at the bottom of the river.

The Terrace of Sdach Kum Ling has a small brick-built ruined temple in its centre. It was covered by lava for hundreds of years.

Srah Damrei is a large, sandstone sculpture of an elephant. It is joined by several other smaller sculptures which have been dated to the 8th or 9th centuries. It is accessible by motor bike and take approximately one hour from the waterfall.

Peung Tbal is a large rock site which has carvings of the Hindu gods Vishnu, Shiva, Brahma, and Ganesh. This site was made around the time of the 8th or 9th centuries. The site is near to the village of Anlong Thom.

Peung Aysey is another site located inside of the jungle of Kulen and contains more rock carvings of Hindu gods and is said to have been a meditation place for rishis.

== See also ==
- Phnom Kulen National Park

== Bibliography ==
- Rooney, Dawn F. (2005). Angkor: Cambodia's wondrous khmer temples (5th ed.). Odissey. ISBN 978-962-217-727-7.
- Higham, Charles (2002). The Civilization of Angkor (1st ed.). University of California Press. ISBN 0-520-23442-1.
- Bruno Bruguier, Jean-Baptiste Chevance, Olivier Cunin, (2020). Les "marches d'Angkor". Guide archéologique du Cambodge, tome 6, JSRC. ISBN 9789995055547
