= Ak Yum =

Archaeological site in Cambodia

- ប្រាសាទអកយំ
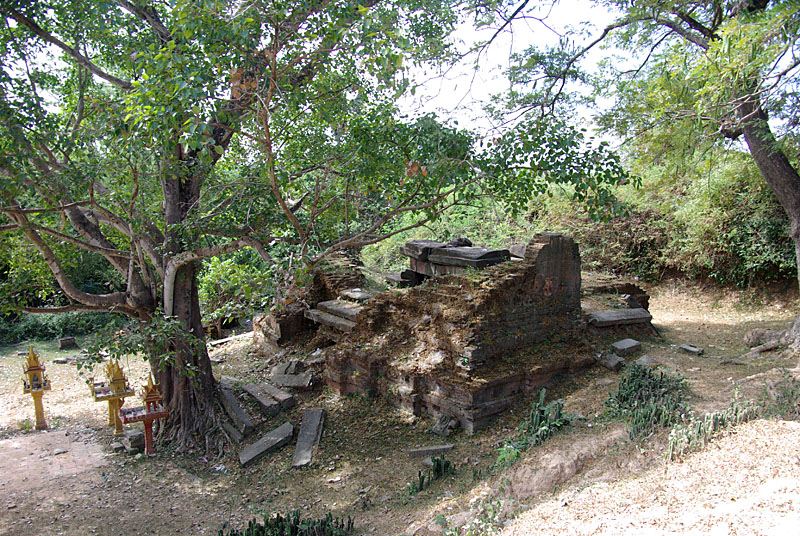
- Ruin of the temple

- Location within Cambodia

Religion
- Affiliation: Hinduism
- Province: Siem Reap
- Deity: Gambhiresvara

Location
- Location: Angkor
- Country: Cambodia
- Interactive map of Ak Yum
- Coordinates: 13°25′28″N 103°46′36″E

Architecture
- Type: Khmer (Kompong Preah style)
- Completed: 2nd half of the 8th century AD

Ak Yum (Khmer: អកយំ, Âk Yum [ʔɑːk jom]) is an ancient temple in the Angkor region of Cambodia. Helen Jessup dates the temple to the 8th century, and states it is the oldest known example of "temple mountain" in Southeast Asia.

The historical significance of Ak Yum far outweighs its ruined appearance although the grassy mound set in a grove of trees makes it a popular tourist attraction as a starting point for a tour of the Angkor Archaeological Park.

== Description ==
=== Location ===
The ruins of Ak Yum temple are situated on the south bank of the West Baray, approximately 1.5 km from the southwestern corner.

=== Architecture ===
==== One of the oldest temple mountains in Southeast Asia ====
Archeological excavations have revealed a pyramidal structure composed of three different levels with a central tower at its summit. The lowest level is a square base of 100 meters on each side and 2.60 meters height. Built with dirt, only its causeway was covered with bricks. The second floor is accessible through at set of stairs to a square platform of 42 meters on each side and 2.40 meters height. Three angle tours of 4.50 meters on each side mark the second floor. The third and last floor is all of bricks with a platform of 17.5 meters on each side and a height of about 1.80 meters.

==== A unique cellar in Angkor ====
A well which opens from the top of the temple leads a unique type of cellar 12.25 meters below, which is the only known example of a man-made underground cave in the Ankgor Archeological Area. This cellar of 2.60 meters on each side has a height of 2.70 meters at the height of its vault. Two gold leaves representing elephants as well as five polished sandstones blocks led George Trouvé to suppose that plundering had occurred here. A masculine statue of 125 centimeters was found in this underground cellar, which later led archeologists to excavate other foundation wells and make even greater discoveries, such as the broken Buddha thrown into the Bayon temple.

== History ==
=== An early Angkorian capital in the seventh century ===
Ak Yum is an early 'Angkorian' type capital which may have been founded as early as the end of the seventh century. At least one Khmer inscription includes a date corresponding to Saturday 10 June 674 AD during the reign of king Jayavarman I. The first structure on the site was a single-chamber brick sanctuary, probably constructed in the latter part of the 8th century. Later it was remade into a larger stepped pyramid structure, with a base approximately 100 meters square. By all means, it appears that the first construction of the Prasat Ak Yum came before the foundation of the Angkorian Kingdom in 802 on Phnom Kulen.

=== Expansion under Jayavarman II ===
The expansion probably took place in the early 9th Century during the reign of King Jayavarman II, who is widely recognized as the founder of the Khmer Empire. When the West Baray reservoir was built in the 11th Century, Ak Yum was partially buried by the southern dike.

Of three angle tours of 4.50 meters on each side, the one in the South-East angle held an inscription referenced as K. 752 which attested a donation to Gambhiresvara in 1001 AD which proved that the prasat was still in activity during the 11th century. Gambhiresvara, which translates as "lord of the deep", maybe an epithet of Śiva, and it is a divinity found three times in Sambor Prei Kuk as well.

=== The 1932 excavation of George Trouvé ===
The site was excavated in the 1932 under the direction of archaeologist George Trouvé. However, the latter died prematurely in 1935 leaving his excavation work unaccomplished. Henri Marchal continued his work, but the necessity to protect the dike from collapsing limited the excavations to the superior parts of the southern and eastern angle of the complex.

== Gallery ==
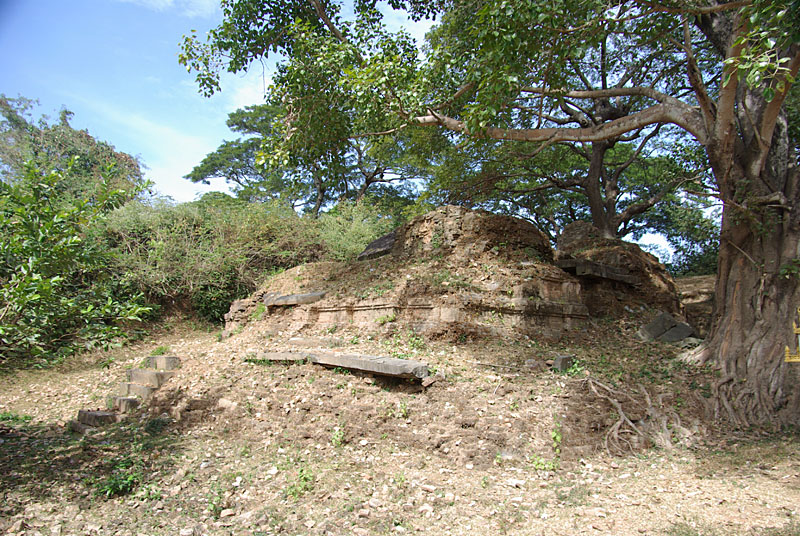
Prasat Ak Yum

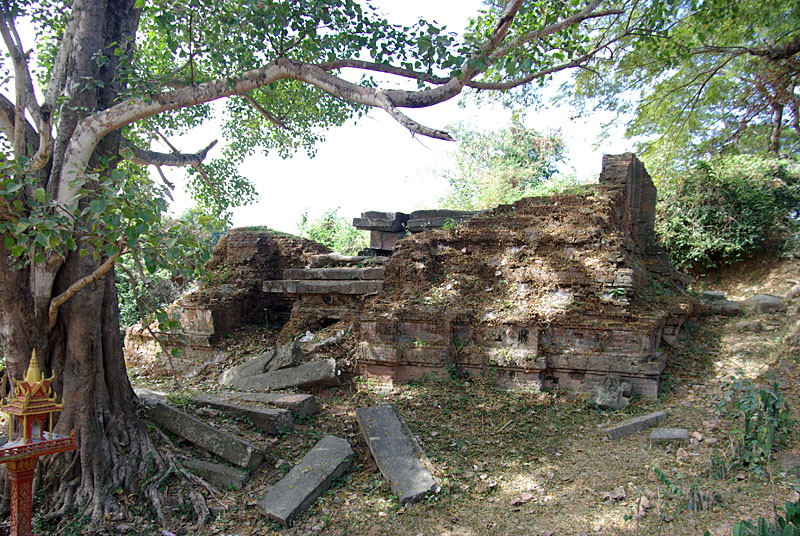
The wall of the temple

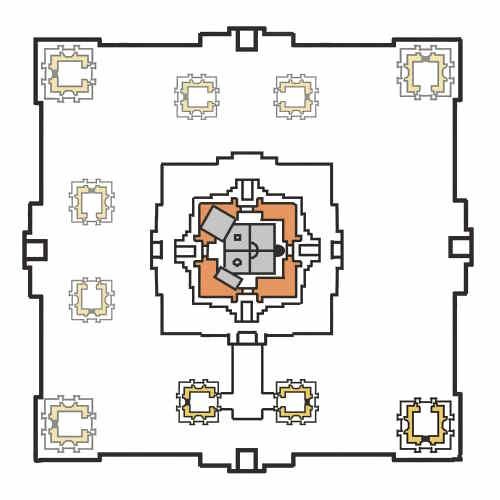
Plan of Ak Yum

== Bibliography ==
- Higham, Charles. The Civilization of Angkor. University of California Press 2001. p. 96
