= Prasat Prei Monti =

Ninth-century Angkorian site

Prasat Prei Monti (Khmer: ប្រាសាទព្រៃមន្ទីរ) is an early Angkorian site in the Roluos group of monuments near Siem Reap, Cambodia. Archaeological evidence identifies it as the royal palace precinct of Hariharālaya, the first Angkorian capital under King Indravarman I (r. 877–889 CE). The site consists of a large moated enclosure with three brick towers on a sandstone platform and traces of wooden structures. Excavations have also uncovered some of the earliest imported ceramics in Angkor, indicating Cambodia’s integration into long-distance trade networks during the ninth century. Remote sensing has shown that Prei Monti was part of Hariharālaya’s water-management system, linking it to the Indratataka reservoir and the wider hydraulic city.

== Location ==
Prasat Prei Monti is located approximately 15 kilometres southeast of Siem Reap, situated south of the Bakong temple-mountain and east of the Indratataka reservoir. The site occupies a large rectangular compound of around 42 hectares, surrounded by a single moat. Excavations in 2007–2008 revealed monumental but secular remains within the enclosure, confirming that the site functioned as the royal palace compound of Hariharālaya.

Remote sensing and ground surveys have also demonstrated that Prei Monti was integrated into the water-management system of Hariharālaya. Canal traces connected its moat to the Indratataka reservoir and to southward embankments leading toward the Tonle Sap. These features formed part of what Bernard-Philippe Groslier once termed Angkor’s “first hydraulic city”.

== Architecture ==
Prasat Prei Monti is enclosed within a substantial rectangular compound measuring approximately 800 by 500 metres and bordered by a moat. At the eastern edge of this enclosure stands a small temple consisting of three brick towers arranged on a shared sandstone platform. This spatial configuration closely parallels that of Preah Ko, where the sanctuary is also placed near the eastern boundary of a larger palace-like enclosure, and has been interpreted as evidence that Prei Monti functioned as a palace precinct rather than a conventional temple foundation.

The three prasats at Prei Monti are comparatively robust in construction but lack elaborate ornamentation. Only one lintel and a few colonettes were completed, which suggests that the decorative programme was left unfinished. A finely carved stone basin has been recorded near the entrance, and although its original function is uncertain, scholars have proposed both ritual and utilitarian uses.

Archaeological work within the compound has identified a central platform area and traces of wooden structures, which are thought to have been used as reception halls or residential buildings. These features, combined with evidence for multiple phases of occupation, indicate the site’s association with elite activity and royal administration. Survey work around the enclosure has also documented residential mounds, linking the precinct with the wider settlement pattern of Hariharālaya and reinforcing its identification as the palace centre of the early Angkorian capital.

== History ==
Hariharālaya was among the first Angkorian capitals. It was occupied by Jayavarman II in the early 9th century and monumentalised under Indravarman I, who constructed Preah Ko, Bakong, and the Indratataka baray. Archaeological research shows that Prei Monti served as the palatial residence of this city, complementing Bakong’s role as the state temple.

The identification of Prei Monti as the royal palace has revised earlier views of Hariharālaya’s urban layout, where the palace was long overlooked. Together, Bakong and Prei Monti illustrate the sacred–secular duality of Angkorian capitals, combining the symbolic power of the temple-mountain with the administrative functions of the palace. Excavations suggest that the site may have been occupied from the late 8th century, predating Indravarman’s reign.

Later sources connect Jayavarman II with Hariharālaya before his consecration at Mahendraparvata in 802. Recent studies highlight that Hariharālaya already had a formalised urban structure before his reign, with Prei Monti as a high-status residence. Christophe Pottier’s excavations concluded that Prei Monti was the Royal Palace of Hariharālaya during the 9th century.

Hariharālaya declined in importance after Yashovarman I relocated the capital to Yashodharapura near Phnom Bakheng in the late 9th century.

== Ceramics and trade ==
Excavations at Prei Monti have yielded one of the earliest assemblages of imported ceramics at Angkor. Finds from the 2007–2008 campaigns included:

- Chinese Yue ware (Zhejiang Province)
- Changsha ware (Hunan Province)
- Ding ware (Hebei Province)
- Guangdong wares
- Islamic glazed ceramics from the Middle East

These wares, dating to the 9th century, consisted of bowls, jars, bottles, and covered boxes. Their concentration at Prei Monti indicates elite consumption and ceremonial display within the palace. The assemblage parallels cargo from the Belitung shipwreck (ca. 826 CE), which carried similar Chinese and Middle Eastern wares across Southeast Asia.

Archaeologists classify the Prei Monti finds as part of the first phase of Angkorian trade ceramics, confirming that the Angkorian state was engaged in interregional exchange from its foundation.

== Significance ==
Prasat Prei Monti is regarded as a key site for the study of early Angkorian urbanism. Its identification as the palace compound of Hariharālaya has altered earlier interpretations of the city, which was once thought to lack a formal royal residence. In combination with the nearby temple of Bakong, the site illustrates the arrangement of palace and temple that became a characteristic feature of later Angkorian capitals.

The recovery of imported ceramics from China and the Middle East at Prei Monti represents some of the earliest material evidence for Angkor’s participation in long-distance exchange networks. These finds indicate that the Khmer elite had access to prestige goods moving through Indian Ocean trade routes during the ninth century.

The site’s integration into the canal and reservoir system of Hariharālaya further demonstrates its role within the wider hydraulic landscape. This association supports interpretations of Angkor as a “hydraulic city,” in which water management, agricultural production, and monumental construction were closely linked.

== Visitation ==
Prasat Prei Monti is less frequented than other sites in the Roluos group. It is located about two kilometres south of Bakong and can be reached by rural tracks. Access is possible by tuk-tuk, bicycle, motorbike, or on foot. The site is often visited in the early morning when it is quiet. Unlike the major temples within Angkor Archaeological Park, entry to Prei Monti does not require an Angkor Pass.

== See also ==
- Angkor
- Architecture of Cambodia
- Preah Ko
- Lolei
- Hariharalaya
- Roluos (temples)
- Bakong
