= Wat Bakong =

20th-century Buddhist pagoda in Roluos, Cambodia

Coordinates: 13.3362°N 103.97507°E

Wat Bakong វត្តបាគង
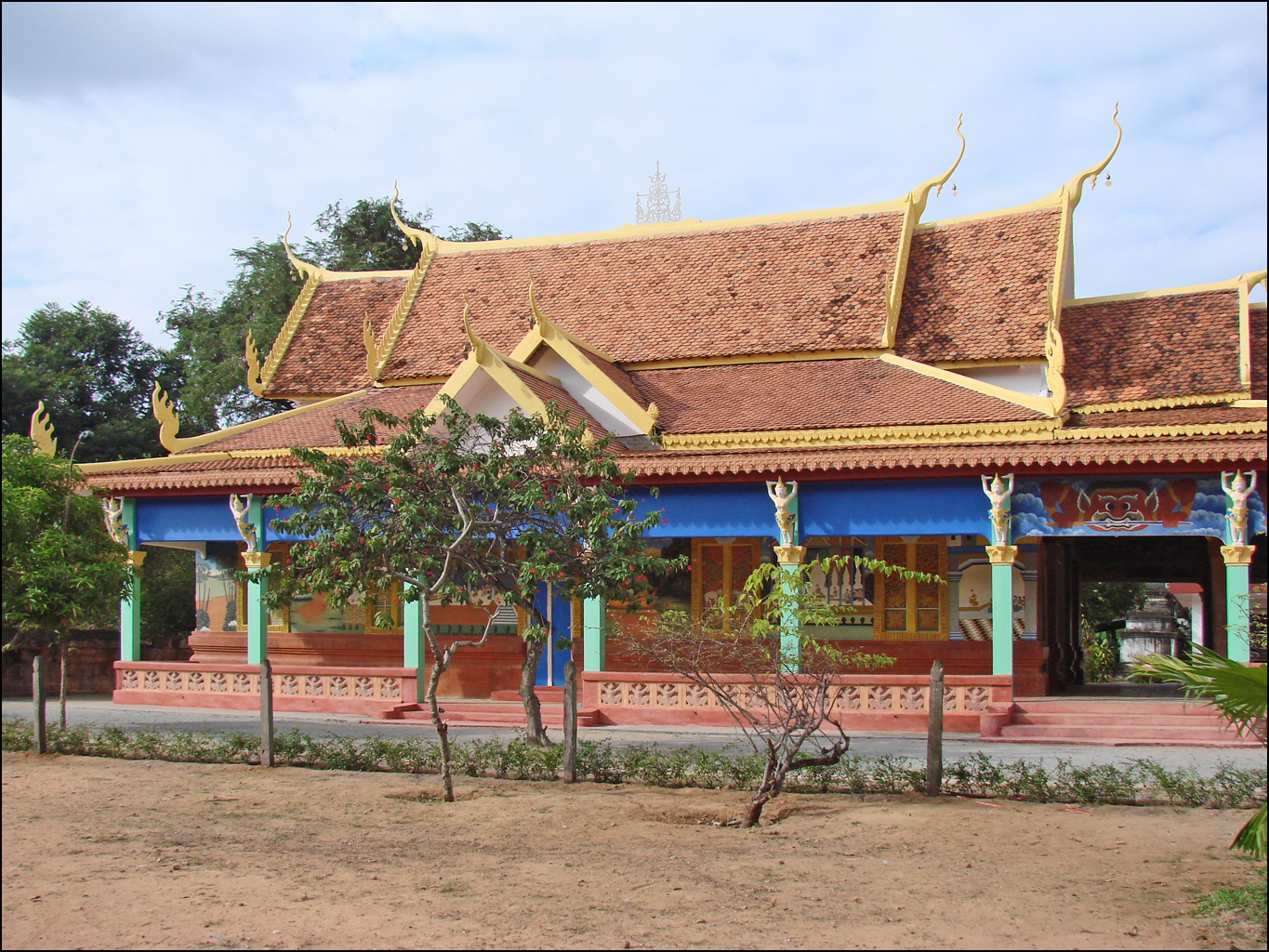

- Location within Cambodia

Religion
- Affiliation: Theravada Buddhism

Location
- Location: Bakong, Roluos, Siem Reap
- Country: Cambodia

Architecture
- Completed: 1939

Wat Bakong (វត្តបាគង) is a Theravada Buddhist pagoda on the precincts of the Prasat Bakong in the Ruluos archeological area of the Siemreap Province.

== History ==
In 1890, the French explorer Lucien Fournereau climbed up the Prasat Bakong and witnessed the presence of a Buddhist pagoda which sheltered ancient steles.

In the 1930s, French tourists were surprised by the Brahmanic rites which continued to be celebrated in the Buddhist pagoda on top of an Angkorian temple as in the nearby Preah Ko.

The Wat Bakong was restructured in 1939. The Buddhist pagoda was displaced from the top of Wat Bakong, which was undergoing archaeological excavations and restoration, to the west wall of the temple precinct.

In 1960, more than twenty years after its construction, the presence of this new pagoda in the precinct of the ancient temple was still criticized as an "hideous modern pagoda that disfigures Bakong".

By 2011, the perception of its presence had changed and the paintings of the pagoda, now considered valuable cultural heritage, underwent restoration to restore the decoration of the pagoda as it was in 1946. The restored pagoda was inaugurated on 12 December 2011, in presence of Deputy Prime Minister Sok An.

In 2020, the monks of Wat Bakong collaborated with local authorities to protect what are considered sacred fishes from the drought that dried up the moat surrounding the temple.

== Architecture ==
The shape of the pagoda is quite unique: it has a gallery to the north and to the south and on the east side a porch nine meters long with decorated panels. In both interior and exterior panels, scenes of daily Khmer life are intertwined with elements associated with the presence of the French, during the French protectorate of Cambodia: French military, French flags, airplanes, a truck and a French bicycle.

=== Porch ===
Under the porch, on the inside, seven paintings of the Vessantara Jātaka are set between the columns while on the exterior, themes of other Jātaka tales are evoked.

=== Interior ===
The paintings inside the pagoda, above and under the bays, describe stereotypical scenes of the life of the Buddha.

The roof is decorated with characters floating over clouds as well as legendary animals.

== Bibliography ==
- Roveda, Vittorio (2011). The Restoration of Wat Bakong Murals in Cambodia. Holcim. ISBN 978-99963-644-0-2.
