= Lolei =

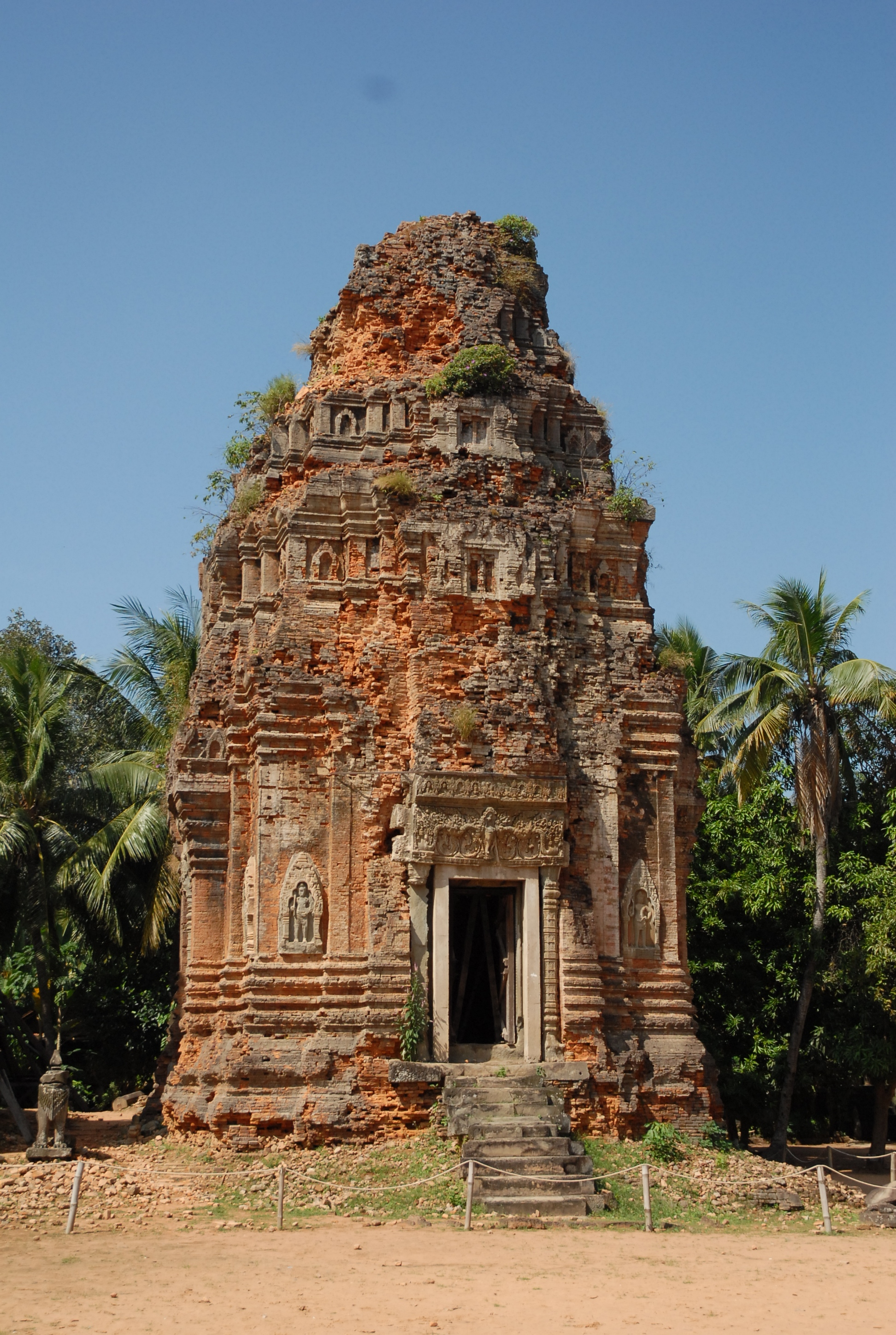

- Location in Cambodia

Religion
- Affiliation: Hinduism
- Deity: Shiva

Location
- Location: Roluos, Siem Reap
- Country: Cambodia
- Interactive map of Lolei
- Coordinates: 13°21′10″N 103°58′26″E

Architecture
- Type: Khmer (Preah Ko to Bakheng style)
- Creator: Yasovarman I
- Completed: 893 A.D.

Lolei (Khmer: ប្រាសាទលលៃ) is the northernmost temple of the Roluos group of three late 9th century Hindu temples at Angkor, Cambodia, the others members of which are Preah Ko and the Bakong. Lolei was the last of the three temples to be built as part of the city of Hariharalaya that once flourished at Roluos, and in 893 the Khmer king Yasovarman I dedicated it to Shiva and members of the royal family. The name "Lolei" is thought to be a modern corruption of the ancient name "Hariharalaya," which means "the city of Harihara." Once an island temple, Lolei was located on an island slightly north of the centre in the now dry Indratataka baray, construction of which had nearly been completed under Yasovarman's father and predecessor Indravarman I. Scholars believe that placing the temple on an island in the middle of a body of water served to identify it symbolically with Mount Meru, home of the gods, which in Hindu mythology is surrounded by the world oceans.

== Site ==
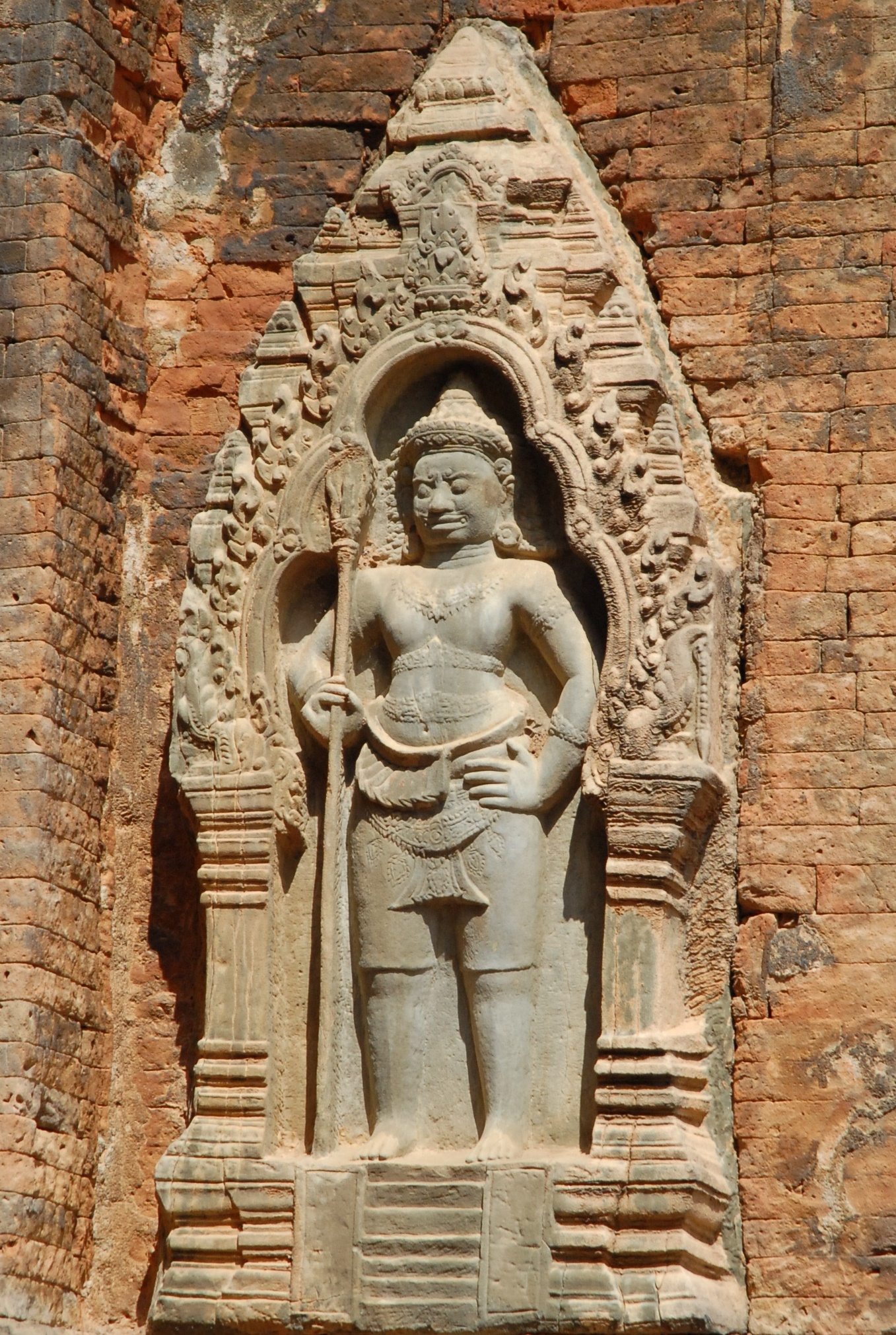
This sandstone carving at Lolei shows a fanged dvarapala armed with a trident standing in an arched doorway. At the level of his elbows, two makara heads face outward.

Lolei consists of four brick temple towers grouped together on a terrace. The king built Lolei for his ancestors. One for his grandfather, one for his grandmother, one for his father, and one for his mother. The two front towers are for the males while the two towers at the back are for the females. The two taller towers are for his grandparents while the two shorter towers are for his parents. Originally, the towers were enclosed by an outer wall access through which was through a gopura, but neither wall nor gopura has survived to the present. Today, the temple is next to a monastery, just as in the 9th century it was next to an ashrama.

The temple towers are known for their decorative elements, including their false doors, their carved lintels, and their carved devatas and dvarapalas which flank both real and false doors. Some of the motifs represented in the lintels and other sandstone carvings are the sky-god Indra mounted on the elephant Airavata, serpent-like monsters called makaras, and multi-headed nagas.

== See also ==
- Angkor
- Architecture of Cambodia
- Bakong
- Preah Ko
