= Hariharalaya =

Capital of the Khmer Empire

- ហរិហរាល័យ (Khmer)
- Roluos
- Location in Cambodia
- 13°20′N 103°58′E
- Type: Archaeological site
- Periods: Angkor period
- Location: Siem Reap, Cambodia
- Region: Southeast Asia

History
- Built: 802 CE
- Built by: Jayavarman II
- Abandoned: 889 CE

Site notes
- Material: sandstone, laterite, brick
- Architectural style: Preah Ko
- Condition: Ruined
- Public access: Yes

Hariharalaya (Khmer: ហរិហរាល័យ, Hariharalaya) was an ancient city and capital of the Khmer empire located near Siem Reap, Cambodia in an area now called Roluos (Khmer: រលួស). Today, all that remains of the city are the ruins of several royal temples: Preah Ko, the Bakong, Lolei.

== Etymology ==
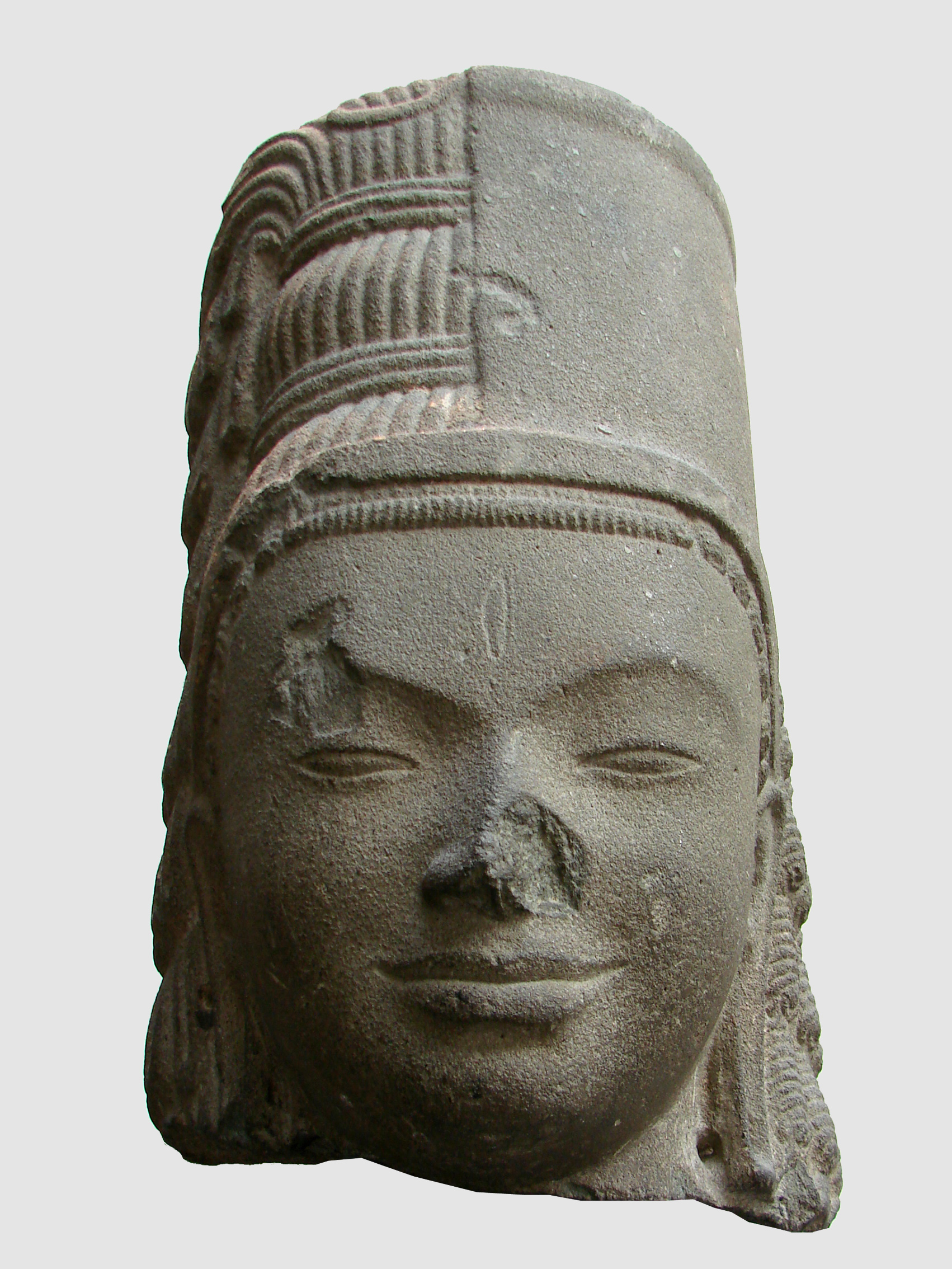
This 7th century CE statue of Harihara is from Phnom Da in Cambodia.

The name "Hariharalaya" is derived from the name of Harihara, a Hindu god prominent in pre-Angkorian Cambodia. The name "Harihara" in turn is a composite of "Hari" (a name of the Hindu god Vishnu) and "Hara" (a name of the Hindu god Shiva). Cambodian representations of Harihara were of a male god whose one side bore the attributes of Vishnu and whose other side bore the attributes of Shiva. For example, the god's head-covering consisted of a mitre-type hat (the attribute of Vishnu) on one side and as twisted locks of hair (the attribute of Shiva) on the other. Alaya is a Sanskrit word meaning "temple", so Hariharalaya means the home of a temple dedicated to the god Harihara.

== History ==
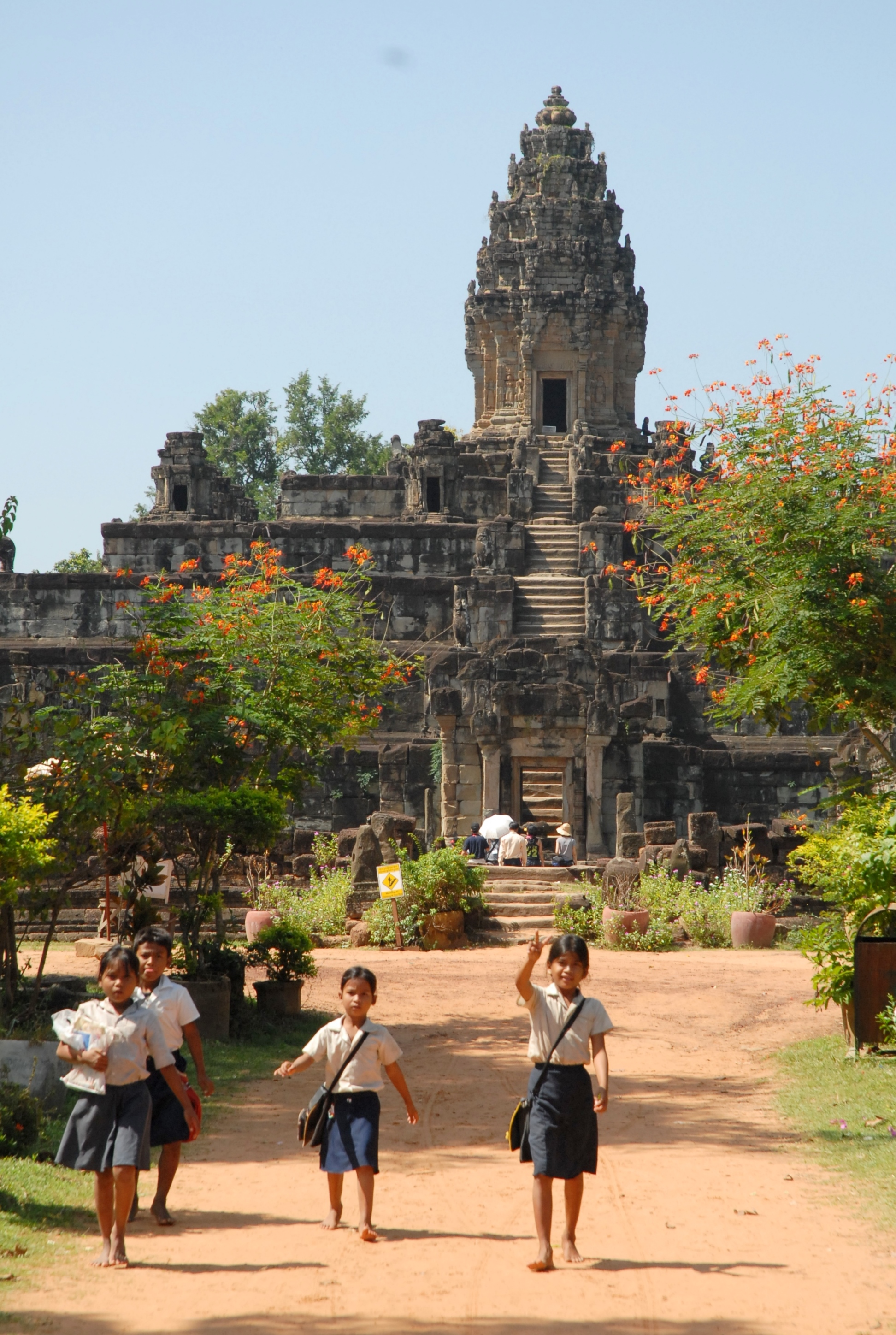
Bakong is the royal temple mountain founded by King Indravarman I at Hariharalaya.

Toward the end of the 8th century CE, the Cambodian king Jayavarman II conquered vast territories near the great lake Tonle Sap. For at least part of this time, he established his capital at Hariharalaya. However, when he declared himself the universal monarch of the country in 802 CE, he did so not at Hariharalaya, but at Mahendraparvata on the Phnom Kulen Plateau. Later, he returned the capital to Hariharalaya, where he died in 835 CE.

Jayavarman II was succeeded by Jayavarman III and then by Indravarman I, who were responsible for the completion of the royal temple mountain known as the Bakong and the construction of Indratataka Baray. Indravarman I consecrated the temple's dominant religious symbol, a lingam called Sri Indreshvara (the name is a combination of the king's name with that of Shiva meaning the lord of Indra (Indravarman I) ), in 881 CE. Indravarman I also constructed the much smaller temple today called Preah Ko ("Sacred Bull"), dedicated in 880 CE. In 889 CE, Indravarman I was succeeded by his son Yasovarman I, who constructed the temple of Lolei (the name may be a modern corruption of "Hariharalaya") on an artificial island in the middle of Indratataka. Yasovarman I also founded a new city at the site of Angkor Thom north of modern Siem Reap and called it Yaśodharapura. Yasovarman made the new city his capital and constructed a new royal temple mountain, known as Phnom Bakheng. Yaśodharapura was to survive until the 1170s CE when it was sacked by invaders from Champa.

== See also ==
- Angkor
- Architecture of Cambodia
- Preah Ko
- Bakong
- Lolei
