= Bakong =

Temple mountain of sandstone in Angkor, Cambodia

- បាគង
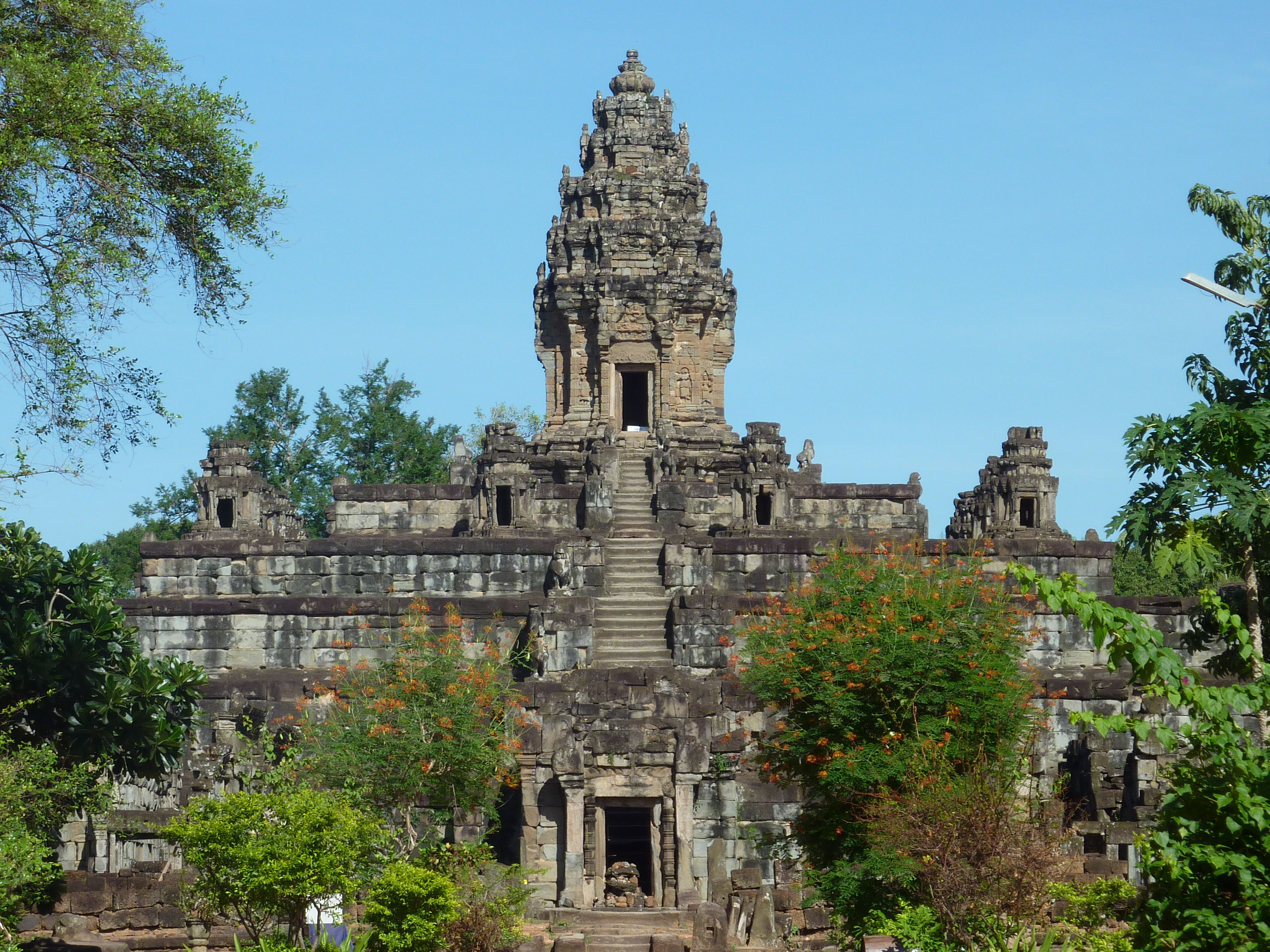

- Location in Cambodia

Religion
- Affiliation: Hinduism
- Deity: Shiva

Location
- Location: Hariharalaya, Roluos, Siem Reap
- Country: Cambodia
- Interactive map of Bakong
- Coordinates: 13.335987°N 103.974116°E

Architecture
- Type: Khmer
- Creator: Indravarman I
- Completed: 881 A.D.

Bakong (Khmer: បាគង [ɓaːkɔːŋ]) is the earliest sandstone temple mountain constructed under the Khmer Empire located at Angkor, near present-day Siem Reap in Cambodia. Built in the late ninth century CE, it served as the official state temple of king Indravarman I within the capital city of Hariharalaya, today known as Roluos.

The structure of Bakong took the shape of a stepped pyramid, popularly identified as temple mountain in early Khmer temple architecture. The striking similarity of the Bakong and Borobudur temple in Java, including architectural details such as the gateways and stairs to the upper terraces, strongly suggests that Borobudur served as the prototype of Bakong. This hypothesis is corroborated by the contact between the earlier Khmer polities and the Shailendra dynasty of the Srivijaya empire, who transmitted not only religious and political models, but also technical and architectural notions that inspired Borobudur, including the arched gateways in corbelling method.

== Site Layout and Enclosures ==
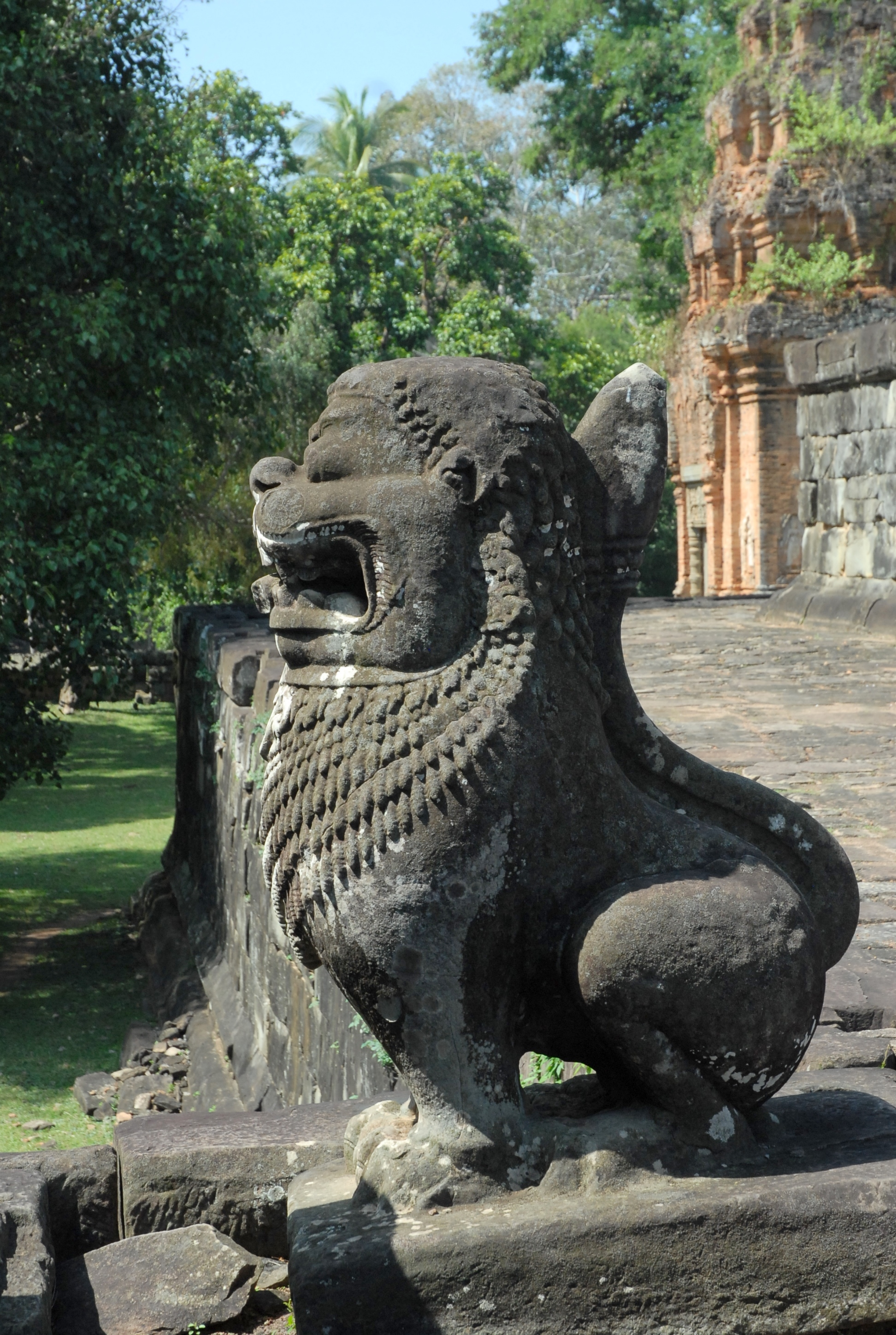
A statue of a lion guards the stairs on the central pyramid.

The site measures approximately 900 by 700 metres and consists of three concentric enclosures separated by two moats and aligned along an east–west axis. These boundaries are imbued with cosmological symbolism: the moats represent the mythical oceans, while the enclosing walls and terrace evoke the mountain chains surrounding Mount Meru, the cosmic center in Hindu and Buddhist cosmology.

The outer enclosure was defined by the now partly visible moat, without walls or gopura. The inner moat, enclosing a space of 400 by 300 metres, was bounded by a laterite wall and accessed through four cruciform gopura. A causeway flanked by seven-headed naga balustrades, the earliest of its kind in Khmer architecture, crosses the moats, symbolising passage into the divine realm.

Between the moats lie the remains of 22 satellite brick shrines. The innermost enclosure, measuring 160 by 120 metres, contains the central pyramid, eight brick towers, and smaller structures. A modern Buddhist temple stands just outside the eastern gopura.

== The Temple Pyramid ==
The central pyramid measures 65 by 67 metres at the base and rises through five levels to a summit sanctuary. As the earliest fully developed temple-mountain, Bakong represented Mount Meru and anchored the cult of devaraja (god-king), wherein Indravarman I's kingship was sanctified through divine association.

The pyramid was restored in the 1930s by French conservator Maurice Glaize using anastylosis methods. The current central tower at the summit dates to the 12th century, reflecting the architectural style of Angkor Wat rather than the ninth-century foundations. Though much of the stucco covering has been lost, surviving relief fragments including the scenes of asuras in battle suggest a once richly ornamented monument. Stone elephants guard the corners of the lower terraces, while lions flank the stairways.

== Architecture and Style ==
Bakong's design marked a turning point in Khmer monumental building. It served as the prototype for later temple-mountains, including Phnom Bakheng and Pre Rup, which expanded upon its form to establish Angkor's monumental landscape.

The temple also demonstrates interregional influences. Architectural details such as the corbelled arched gateways and stair arrangements closely parallel features of Borobudur in Central Java, built under the Sailendra dynasty. These affinities suggest cultural contact and the transmission of architectural knowledge across Southeast Asia.

The five terraces of Bakong embodied a cosmic hierarchy: the lower levels representing the human world, ascending through successive realms to the divine summit, where the sanctum enshrined a lingam of Hindu god Shiva. This ordering allowed ritual ascent to mirror the spiritual journey from the earthly to the divine.

== Political and Religious Significance ==
As Indravarman I's state temple, Bakong was a material expression of the devarāja cult, binding kingship to sacred space. By positioning himself at the apex of the temple-mountain, Indravarman asserted his legitimacy as both a dynastic heir and a universal ruler under divine mandate.

== Later Additions and Continuity ==
Bakong remained significant long after its initial construction. In the 12th and 13th centuries, additional shrines and Buddhist structures were introduced, reflecting the Khmer Empire's gradual religious transformation from Hindu state cults to Mahayana and later Theravada Buddhism. The addition of the later central tower reflects this process of reinterpretation, whereby successive rulers reinscribed authority onto earlier monuments to sustain their relevance within changing political and religious contexts.

== Gallery ==
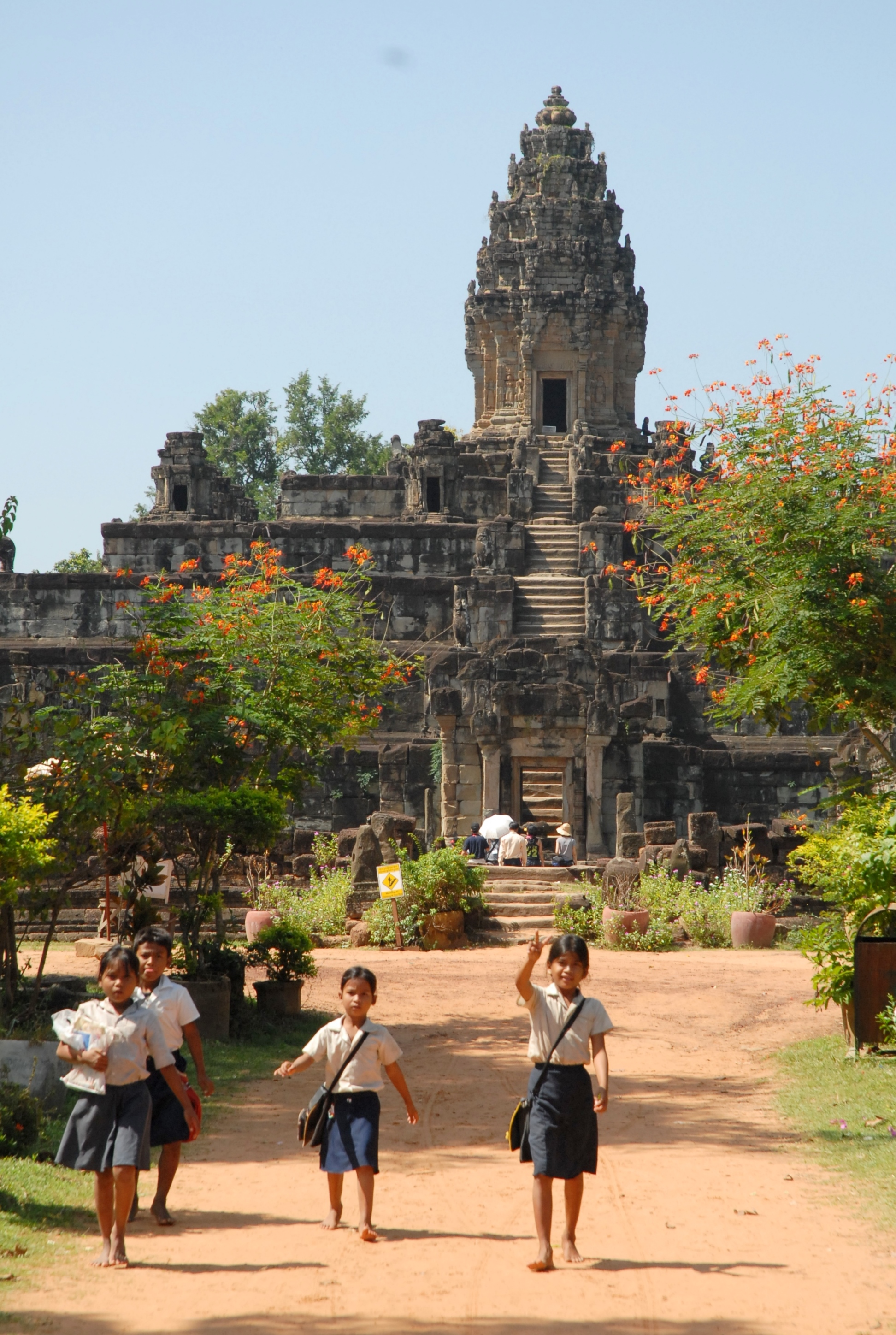

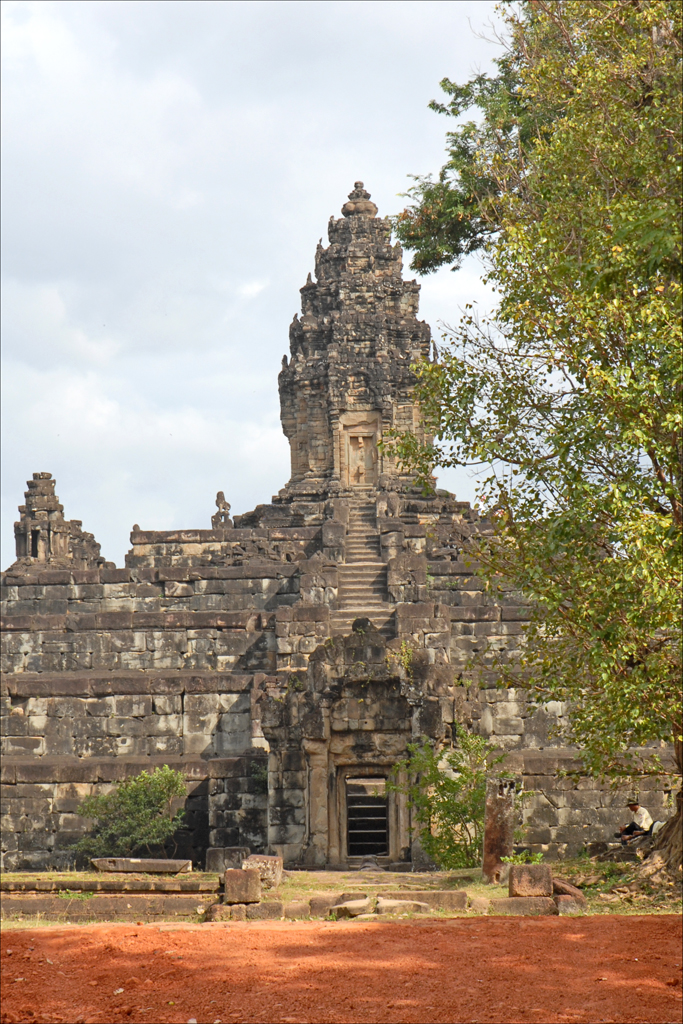

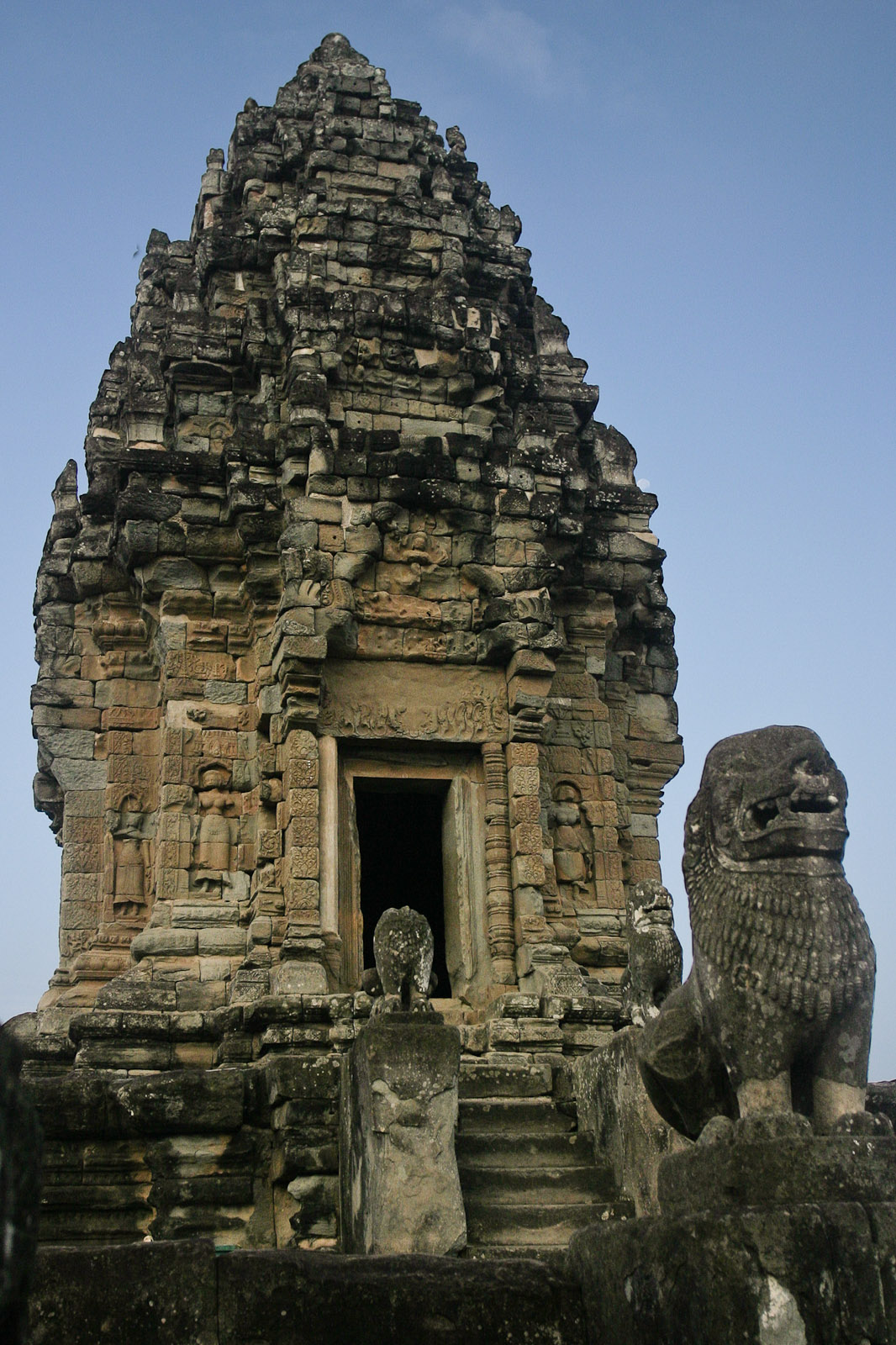

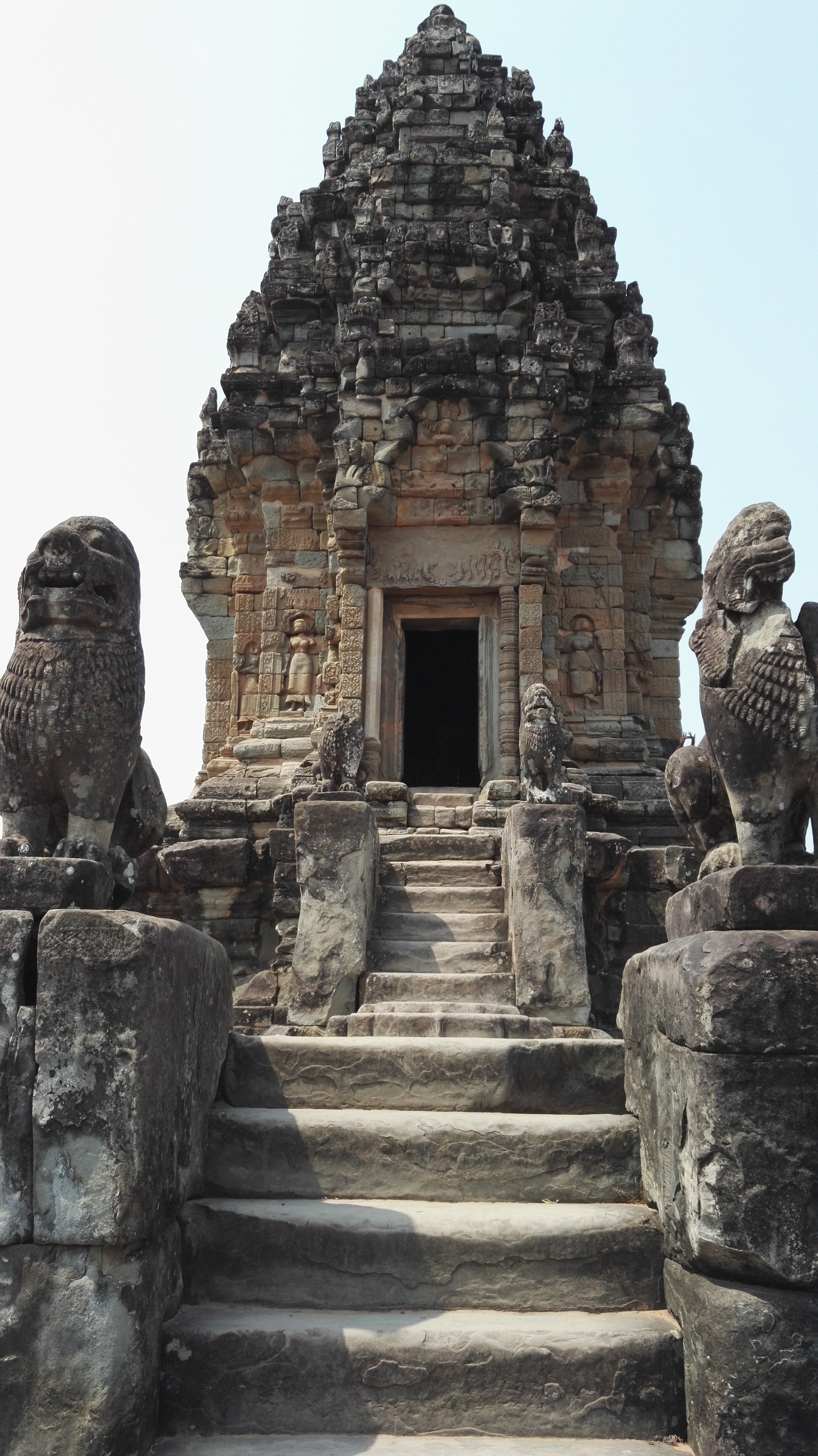

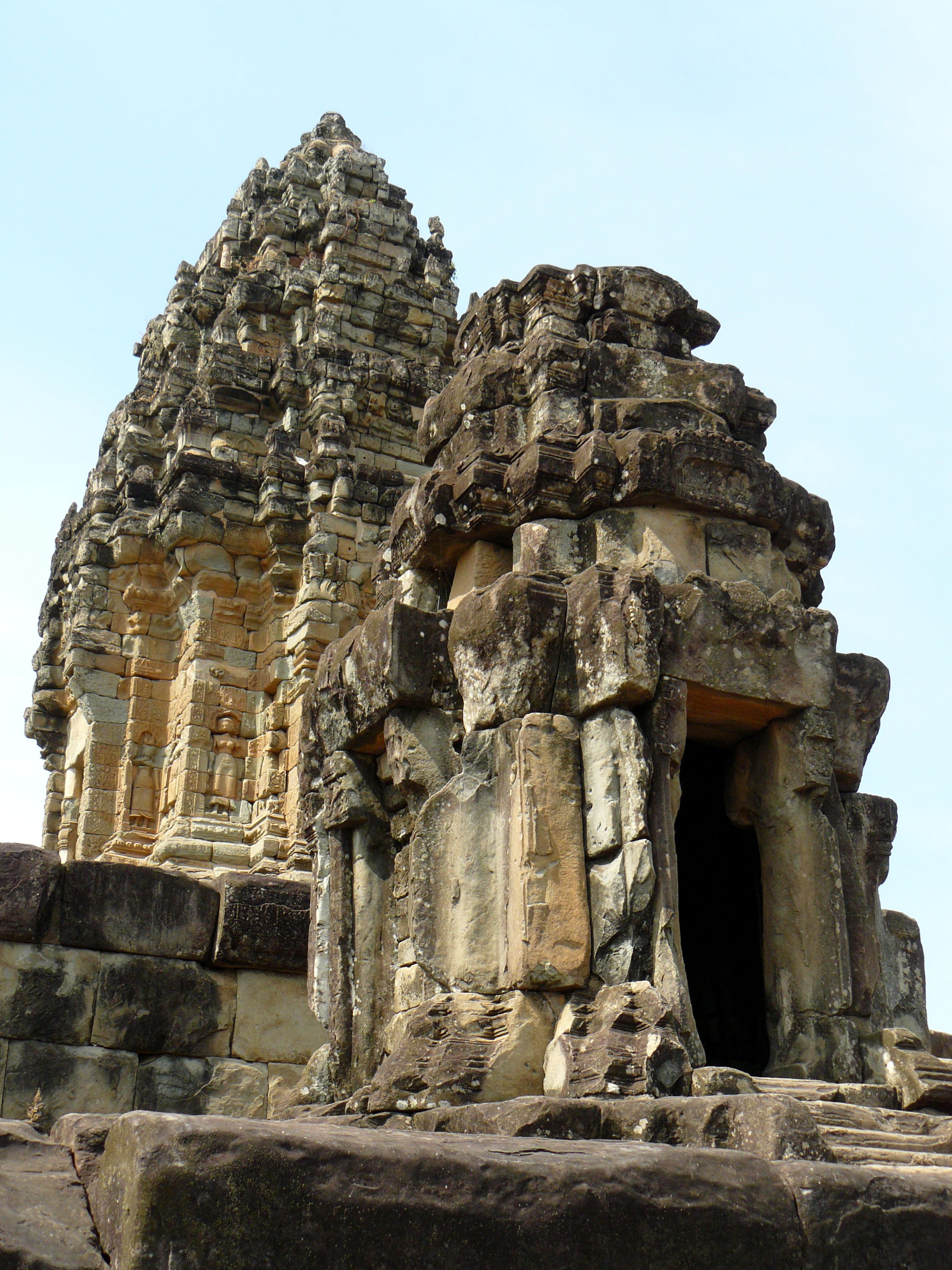

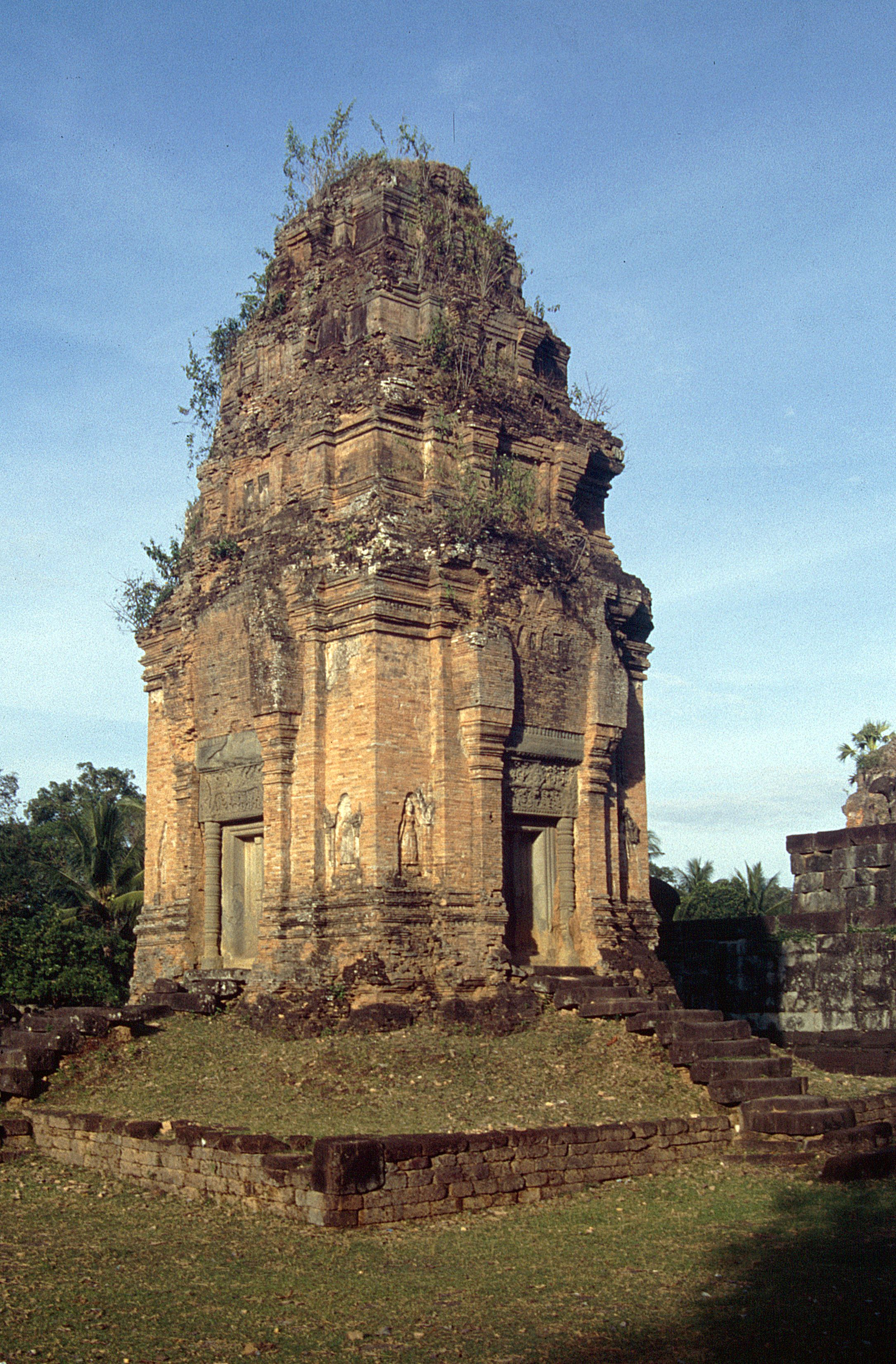

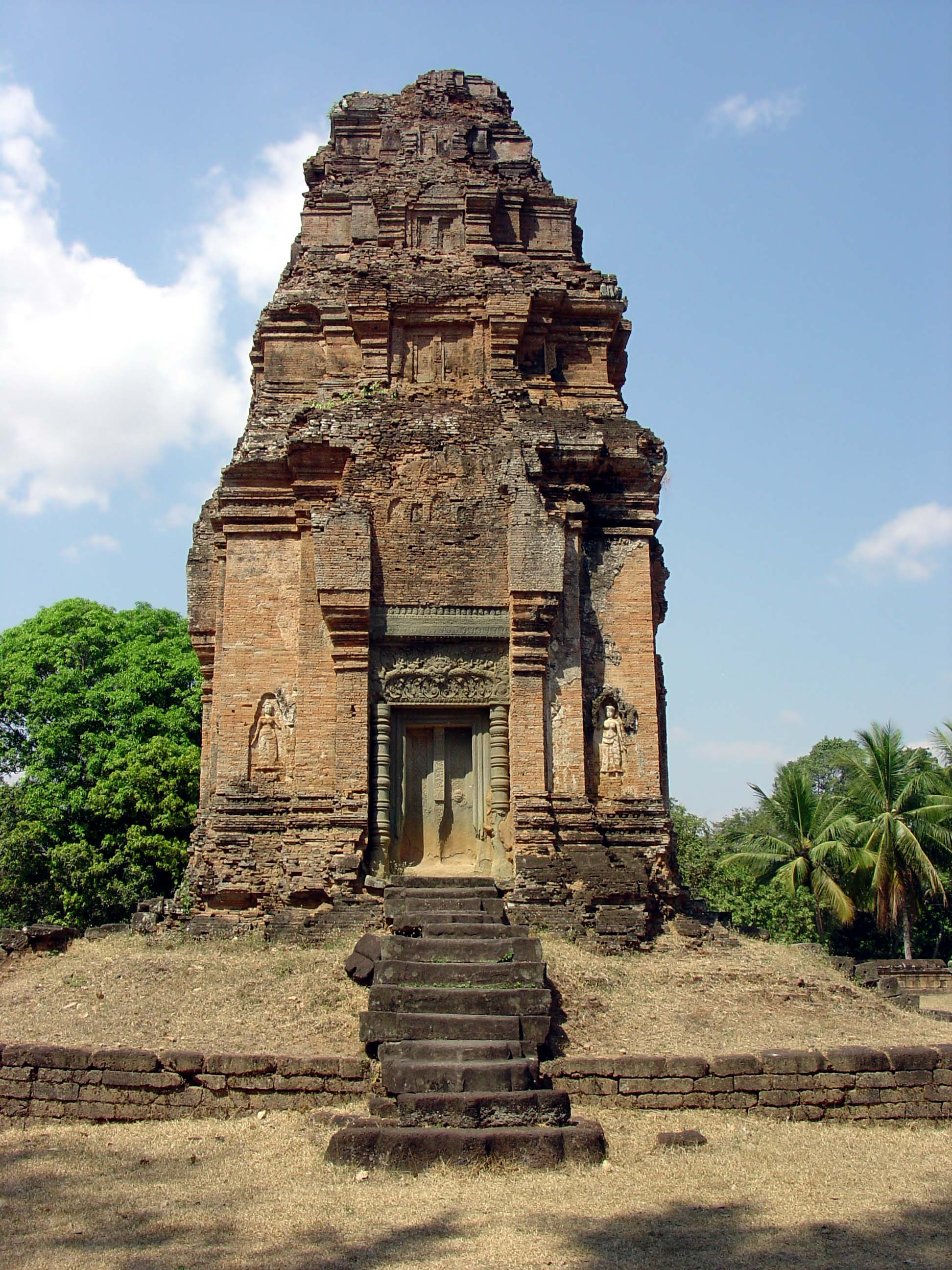

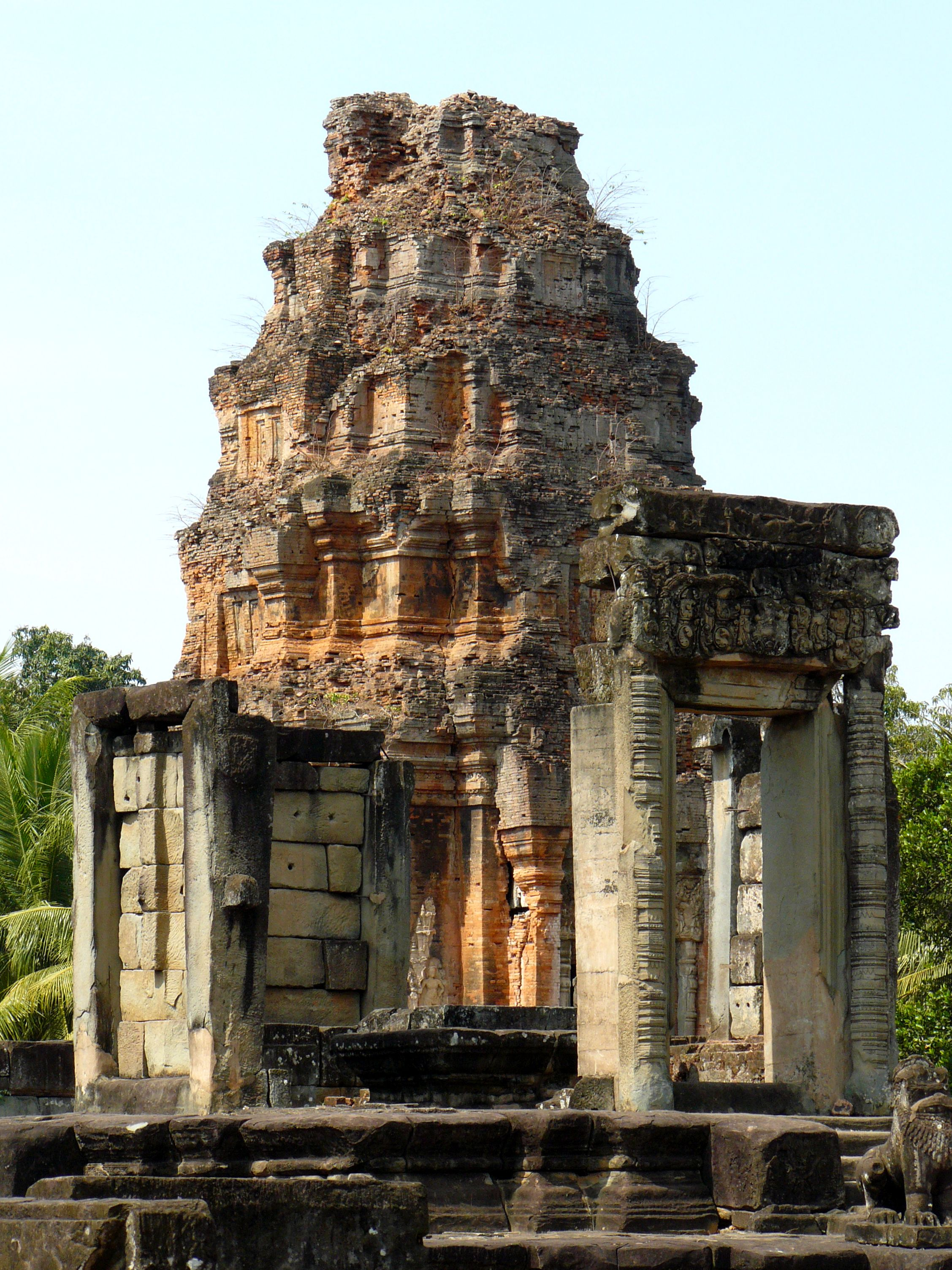

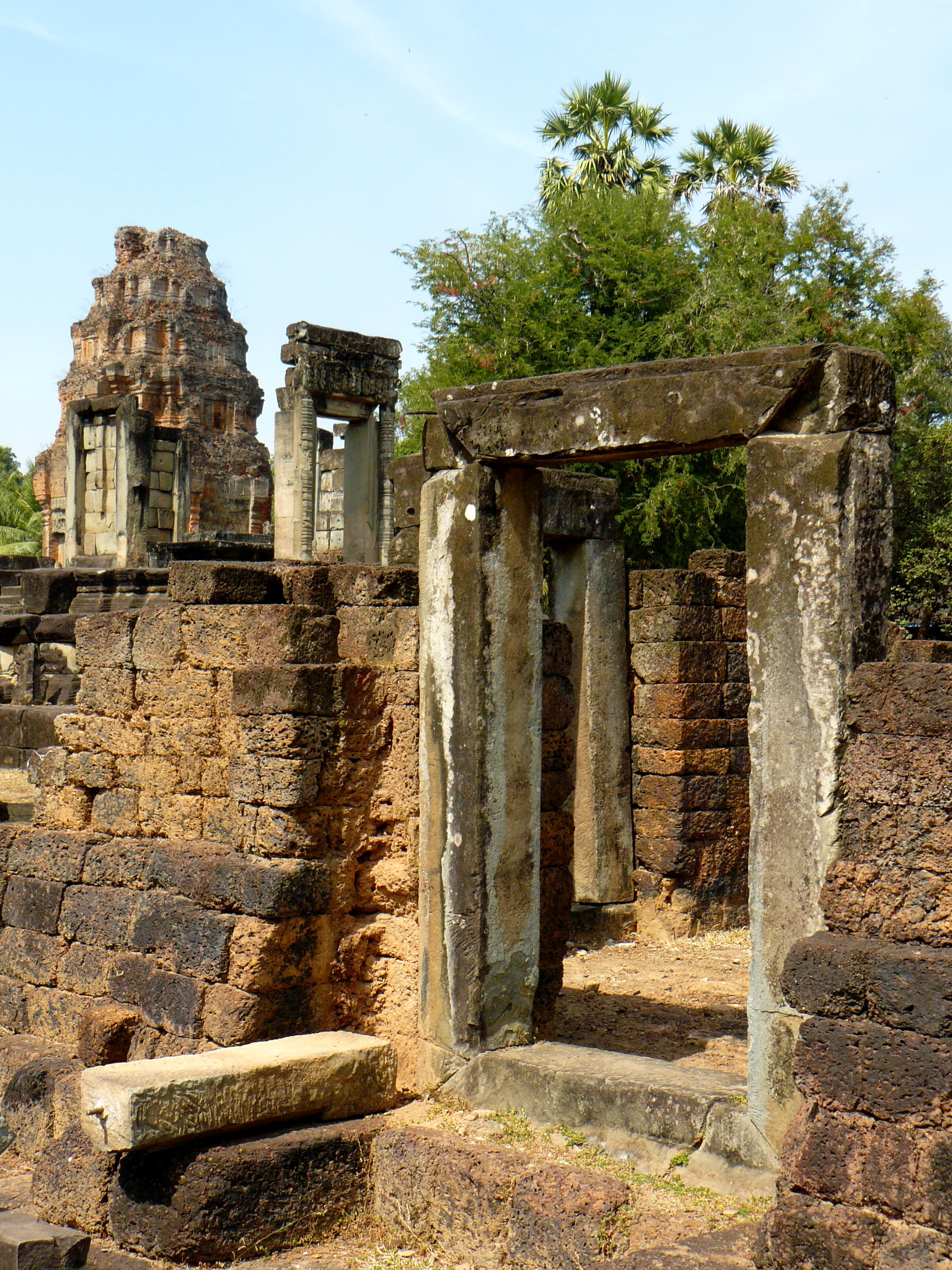

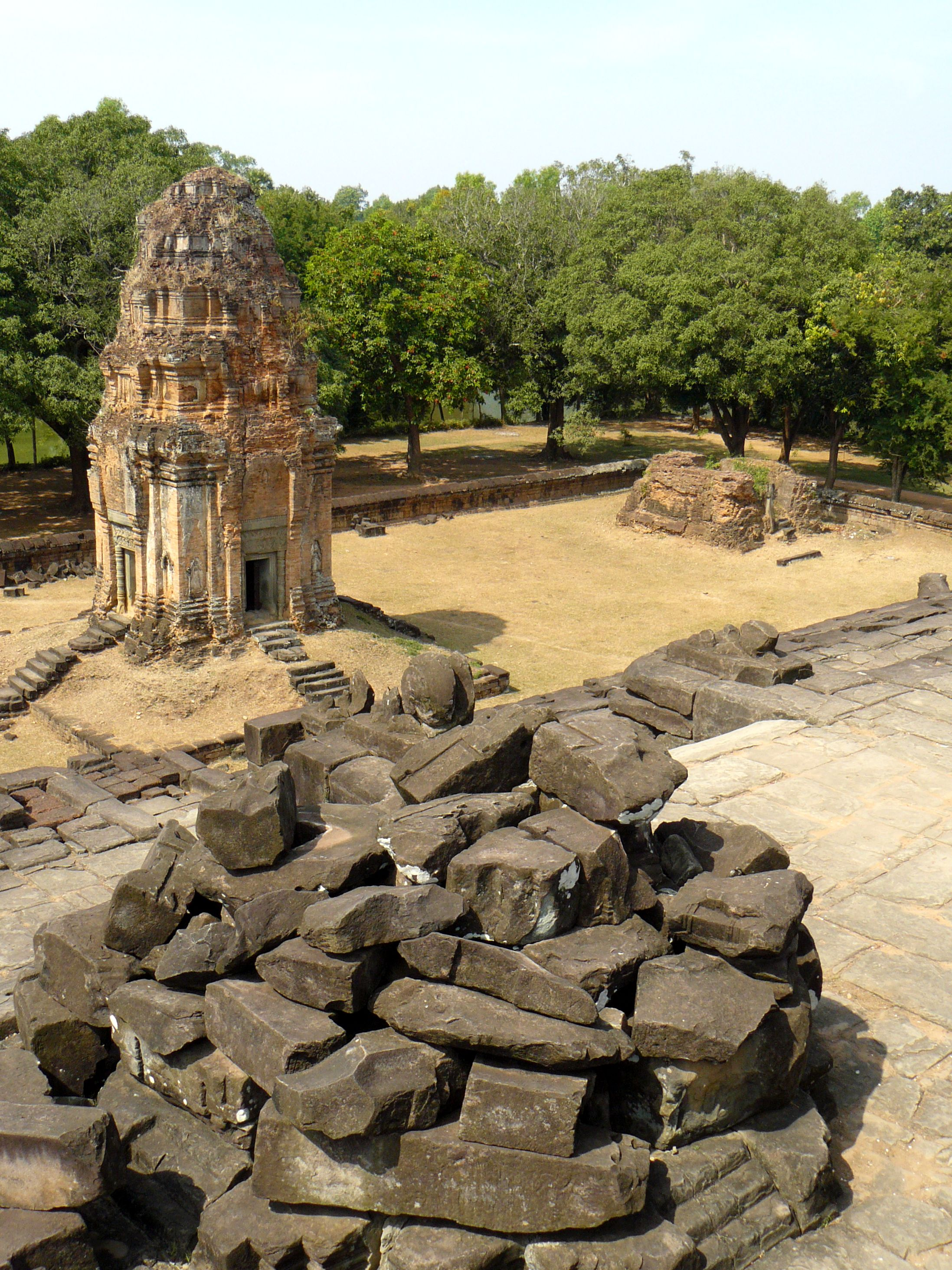

== See also ==
- Wat Bakong
- Angkor
- Architecture of Cambodia
- Preah Ko
- Lolei
- Hariharalaya
