= Roluos (temples) =

Group of temples in Cambodia

- រលួស (Khmer)
- Hariharalaya
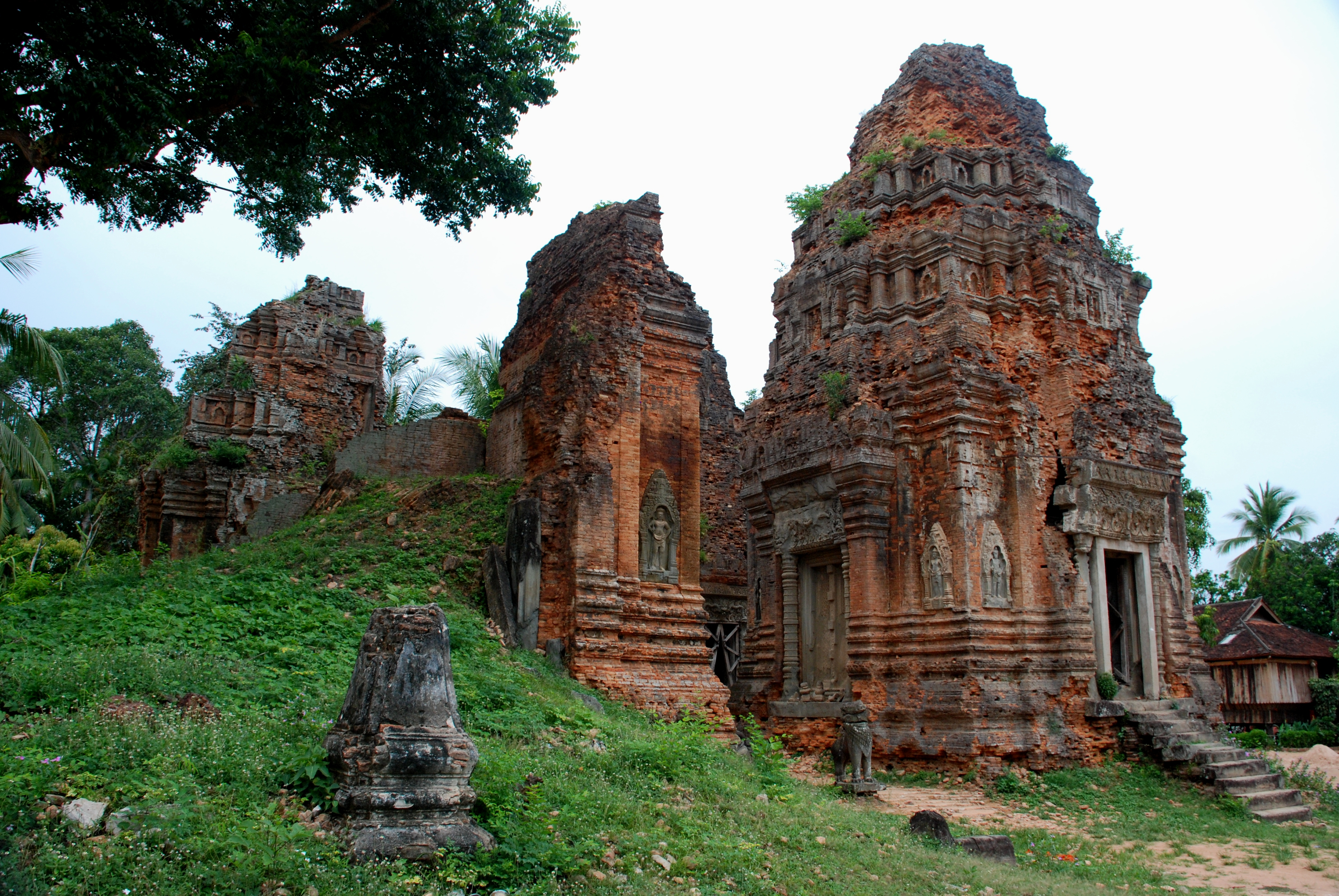
- Lolei temple in Roluos

- Location in Cambodia
- 13°20′N 103°58′E
- Type: Archaeological site
- Periods: Post-classical
- Location: Siem Reap, Cambodia
- Region: Southeast Asia

History
- Built: 9th century AD
- Built by: Jayavarman II

Site notes
- Material: sandstone, laterite, brick
- Architectural style: Preah Ko
- Condition: Ruined
- Public access: Yes

Roluos (Khmer: រលួស) is a Cambodian archeological site The consisting a group of early Khmer Hindu temples located near Siem Reap, Cambodia. Dating mainly from the 9th century, they formed part of Hariharalaya, an early capital of the Khmer Empire under the reigns of Jayavarman II and Indravarman I. The complex includes Bakong, Preah Ko and Lolei.

== History ==
Preah Ko, erected in 879, is dedicated to Shiva and famous for its sacred bull statues. It was built in homage to the king's ancestors, specifically Jayavarman II. Bakong, built in 881 and the most important monument of the group, is also dedicated to Shiva and symbolizes Mount Meru. Before restoration, it was little more than a mound of earth. Lolei, completed in 893 under Yasovarman I, is very similar to Preah Ko. It was the last temple built at Hariharalaya, and it was dedicated to Shiva. The name Lolei is thought to derive from Hariharalaya. At Roluos, only the terraces and some lintels are made of stone. The towers, once covered in colored plaster, are hollow brick.

== Temples ==
The Bakong pyramid is 60 m square at its base and has five levels, reaching a height of about 15 m. It enshrined Indravarman I's palladium, the linga Indreshvara. The sanctuary that crowns the pyramid today dates from a later period of classical Angkorian architecture and replaced an earlier sanctum that had fallen into decay. When the temple was rediscovered, it was heavily damaged, and its restoration took about ten years.

Preah Ko consists of six brick towers on a shared sandstone terrace, and the remains of three kneeling bull sculptures face the central towers. Jayavarman III is not mentioned at the temple, which is therefore better described as an ancestor temple of Indravarman I. Lolei has only four towers, two for male ancestors in the east and two for females in the west. Six towers were apparently planned there as at Preah Ko, but only four were completed. Lolei was the first temple built in the middle of a baray, on a two-tiered foundation. Its architectural style is still that of Preah Ko, also called the style of Roluos or the style of Indravarman. The art historian Gilberte de Coral-Rémusat praised the lintels of this style, particularly those of Lolei, as among the highest and most beautiful in Khmer art.

Prasat Prei Monti is a group of three brick towers in the east of a rectangular compound that was once surrounded by a moat. It is older than Preah Ko and Bakong and is sometimes ascribed to Jayavarman III, about whom little is known and who seems to have resided in this part of Roluos. Others believe it was the first palace of his successor, Indravarman I.
