= Preah Ko =

Ancient Hindu temple in Roluos, Cambodia

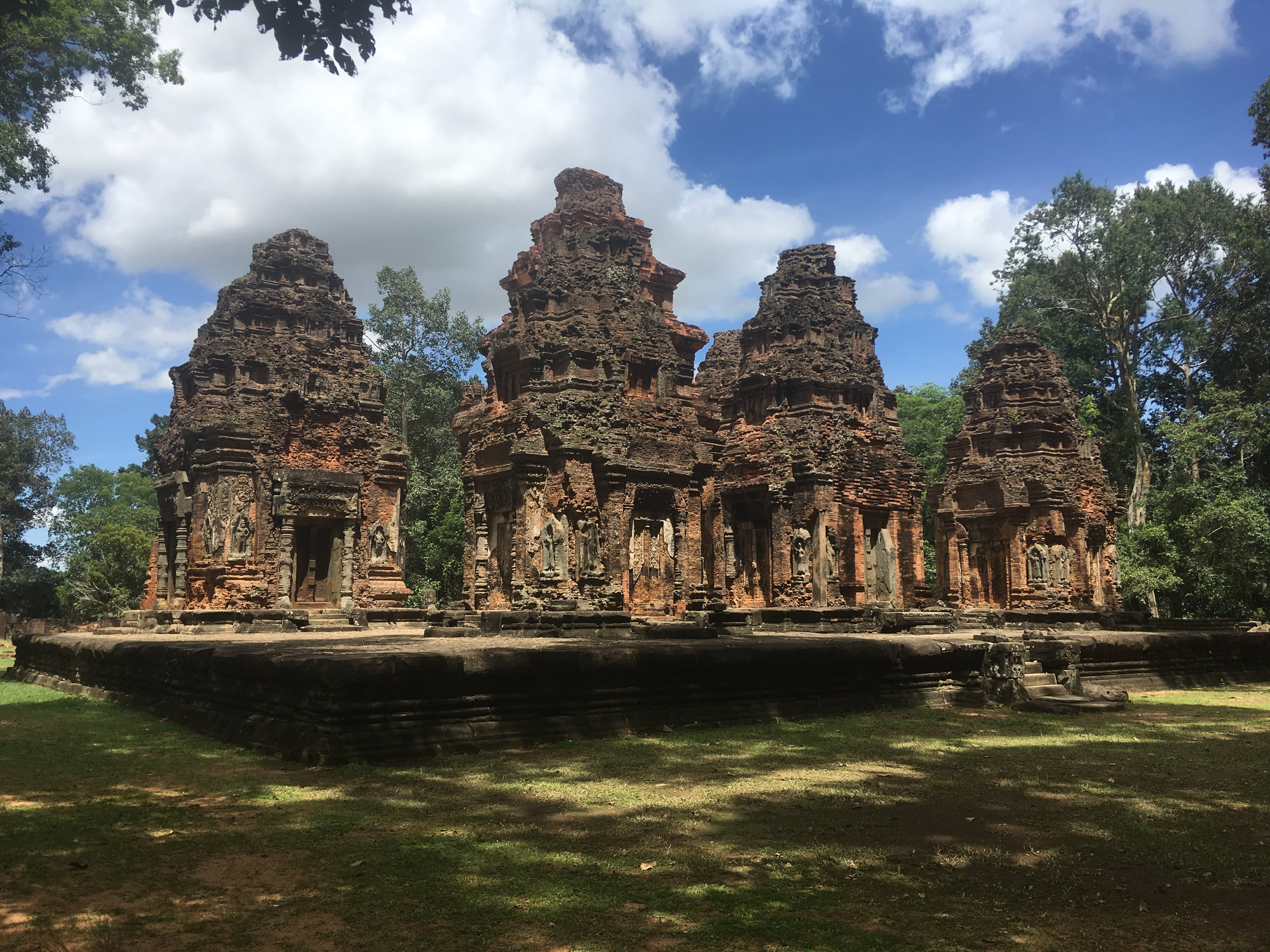

- Location in Cambodia

Religion
- Affiliation: Hinduism
- Deity: Shiva

Location
- Location: Hariharalaya, Roluos
- Country: Cambodia
- Coordinates: 13°20′38″N 103°58′22″E

Architecture
- Type: Khmer
- Creator: Indravarman I
- Completed: 879 A.D.

Preah Ko (Khmer: ប្រាសាទព្រះគោ, "The Sacred Bull") was the first temple to be built in the ancient and now defunct city of Hariharalaya (in the area that today is called Roluos), some 15 kilometers south-east of the main group of temples at Angkor, Cambodia. The temple was built under the Khmer King Indravarman I in 879 to honor members of the king's family, whom it places in relation with the Hindu deity Shiva.

== Etymology ==
Preah Ko (Sacred Bull) derives its name from the three statues of sandstone located in the front of and facing the temple's central towers. These statues represent Nandi, the white bull who serves as the mount of Shiva.

== History ==
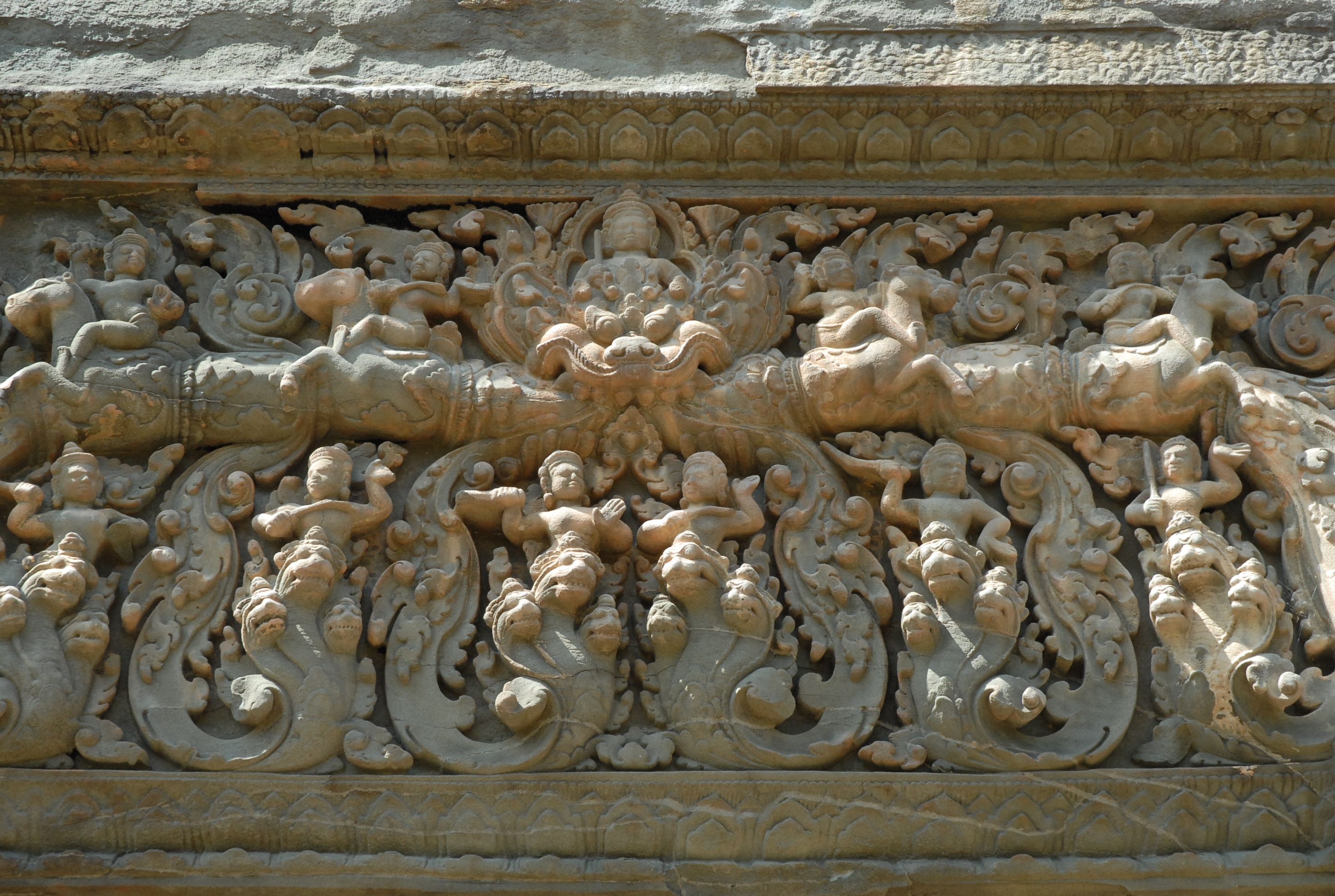
Preah Ko is known for the beauty and intricacy of its carvings. The design on this lintel includes warriors mounted on three-headed nāgas, horsemen, and a deity mounted on a kala.

After the Khmer king Jayavarman II founded the Khmer Empire in 802 CE, he finally established his capital at Hariharalaya, where he died. Indravarman I was the nephew of Jayavarman II. When he ascended to the throne, he ordered the construction first of Preah Ko, which was dedicated in 879, and later of the temple-mountain known as the Bakong. It is likely that this building program was made possible by the king's peaceful reign and his ability to draw income from the expanding empire. A restoration of the towers took place in the early 1990s, financed by the German government.

== Site ==
Preah Ko consists of six brick towers arranged in two rows of three towers each, perched on a sandstone platform. The towers face east, and the front central tower is the tallest. The sanctuaries are dedicated to three divinized forefathers of Indravarman and their respective wives. The front central tower is dedicated to Jayavarman II, the founder of the Khmer empire. The tower to the left is dedicated to Prithivindreshvara, King Indravarman's father; the tower to the right to Rudreshvara, his grandfather. The three rear towers are dedicated to the wives of these three men. The central towers all bear images of the Hindu god Shiva.

== Gallery ==
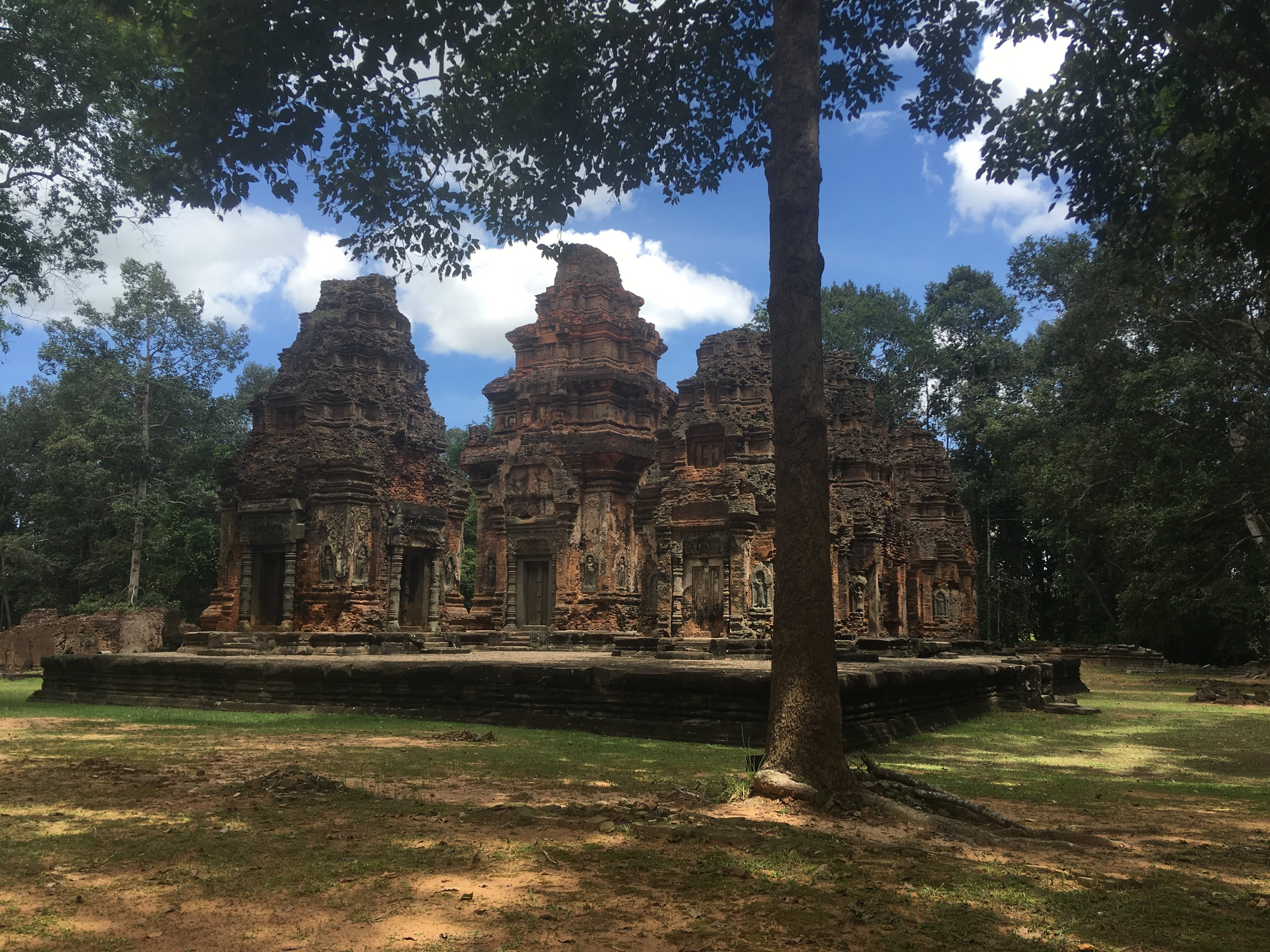

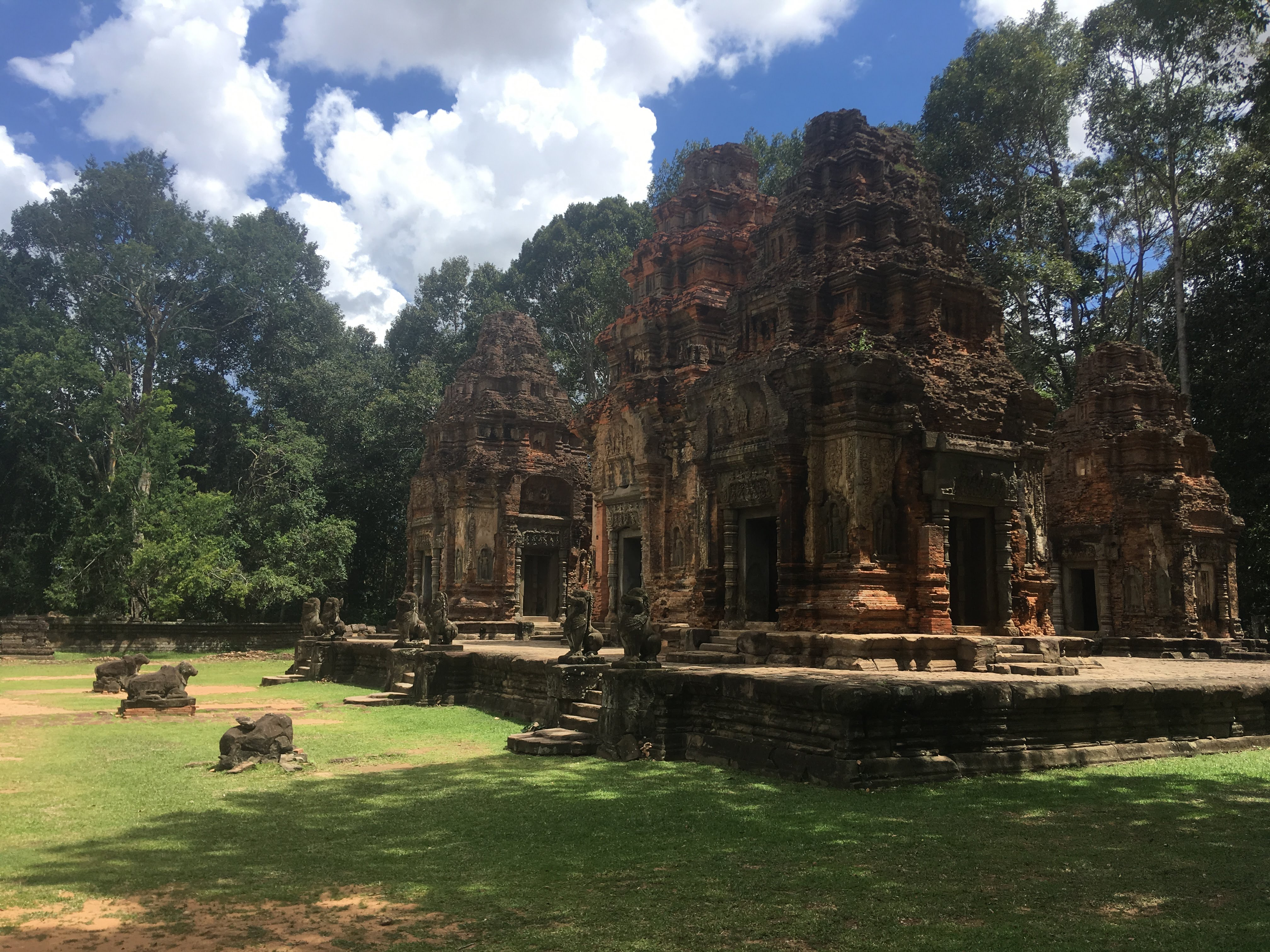

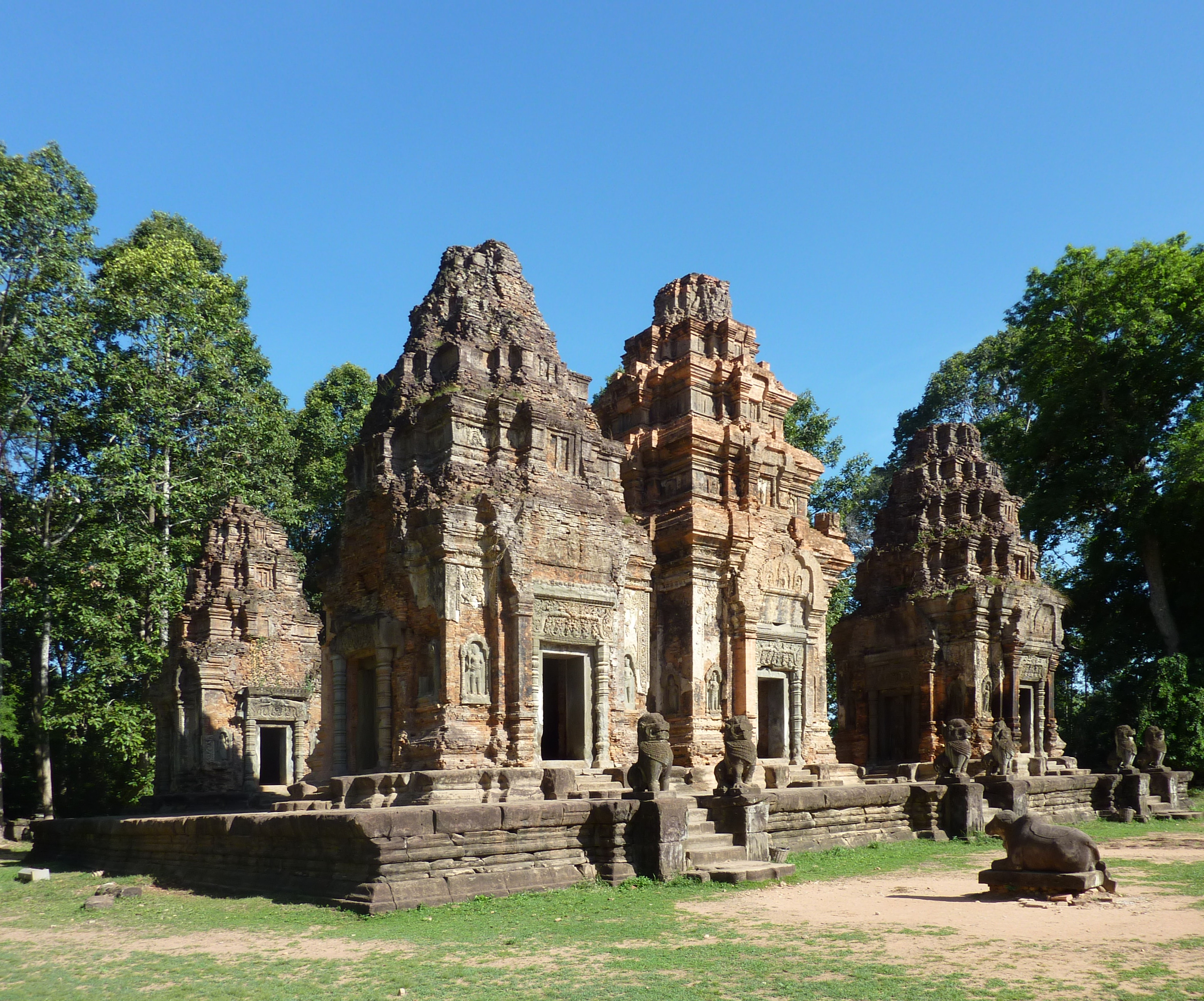

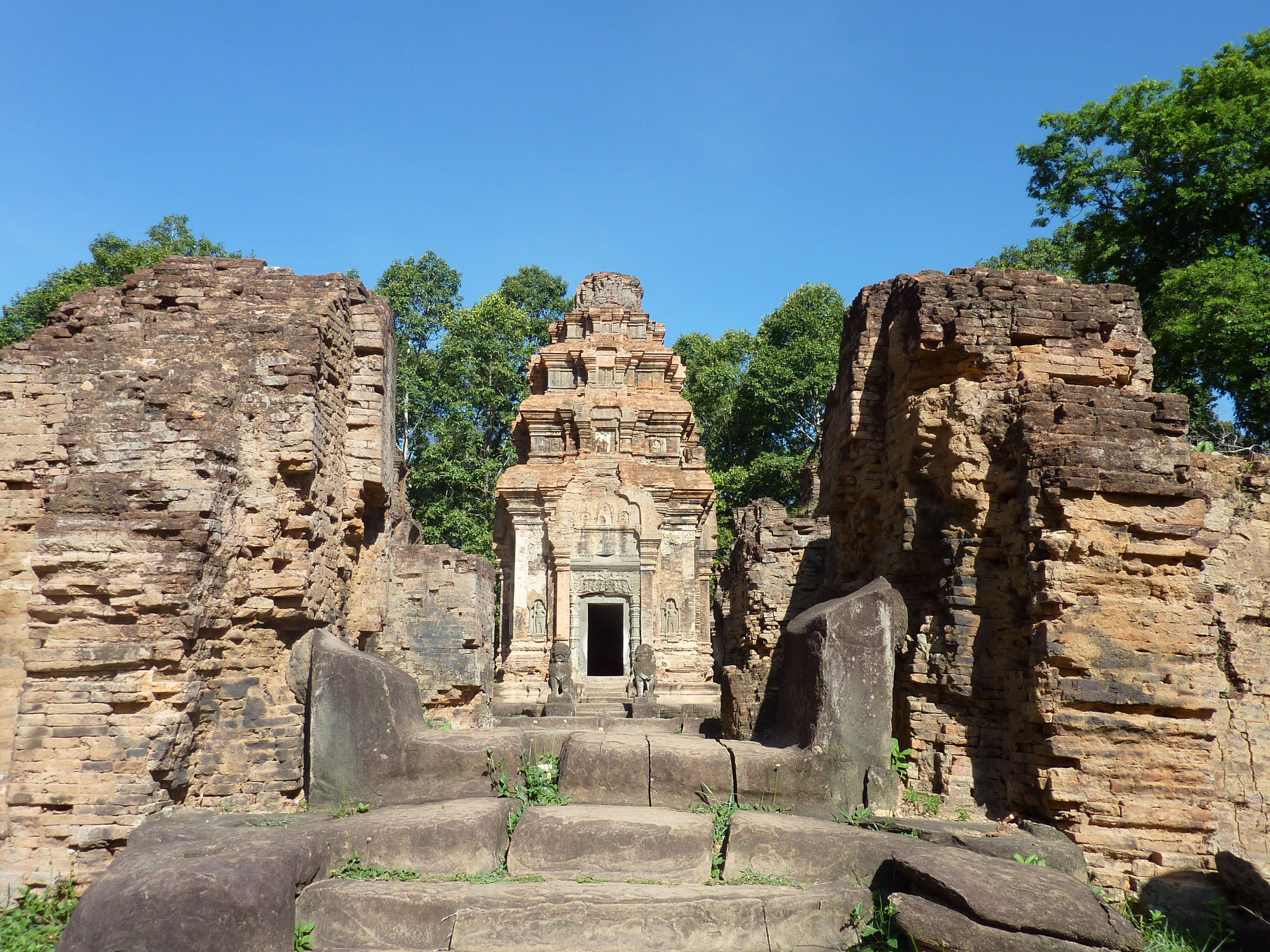

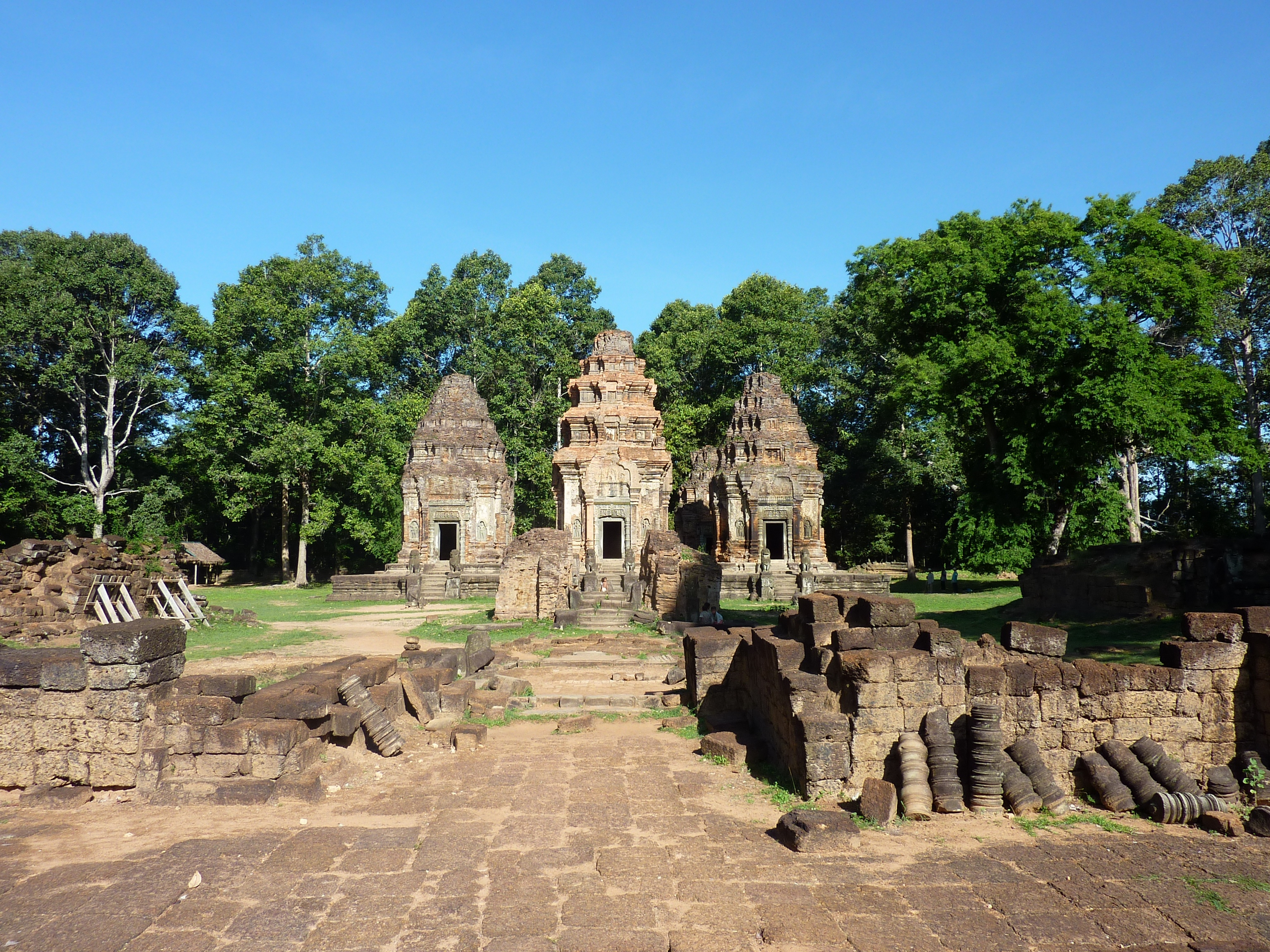

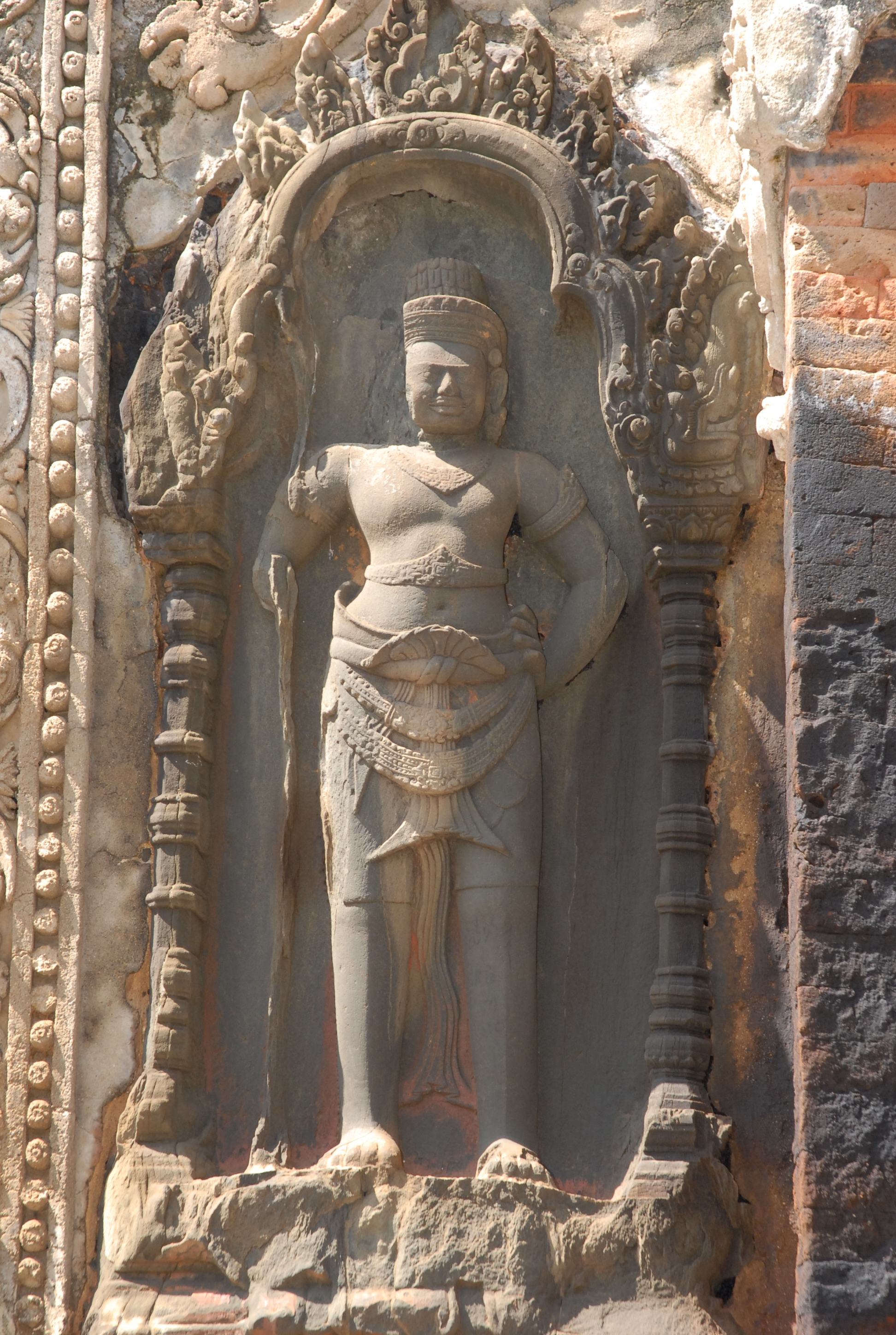

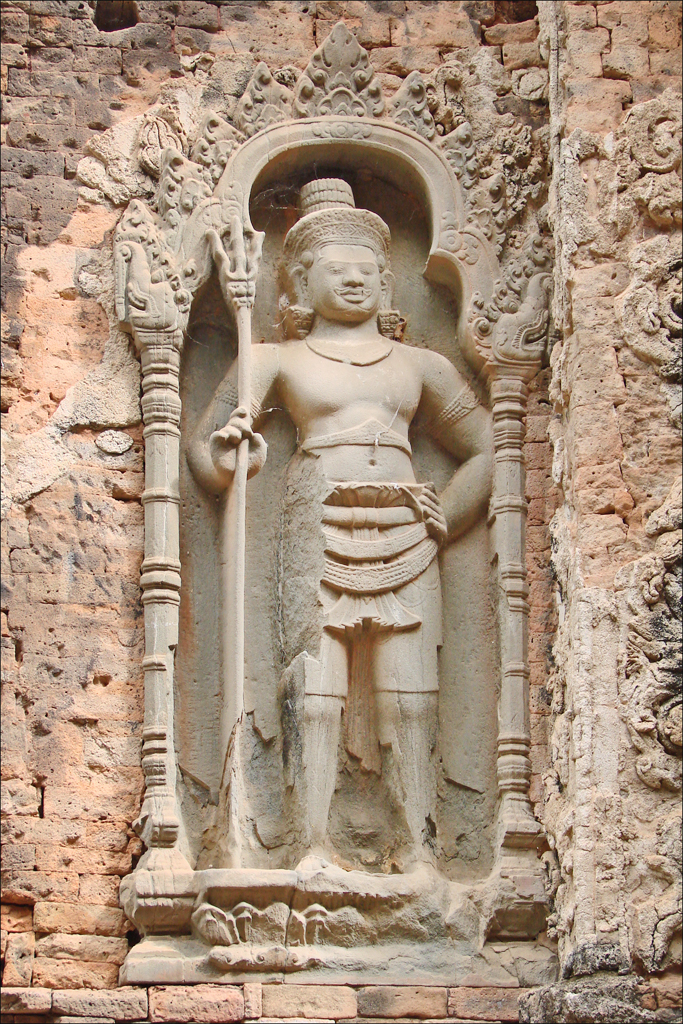

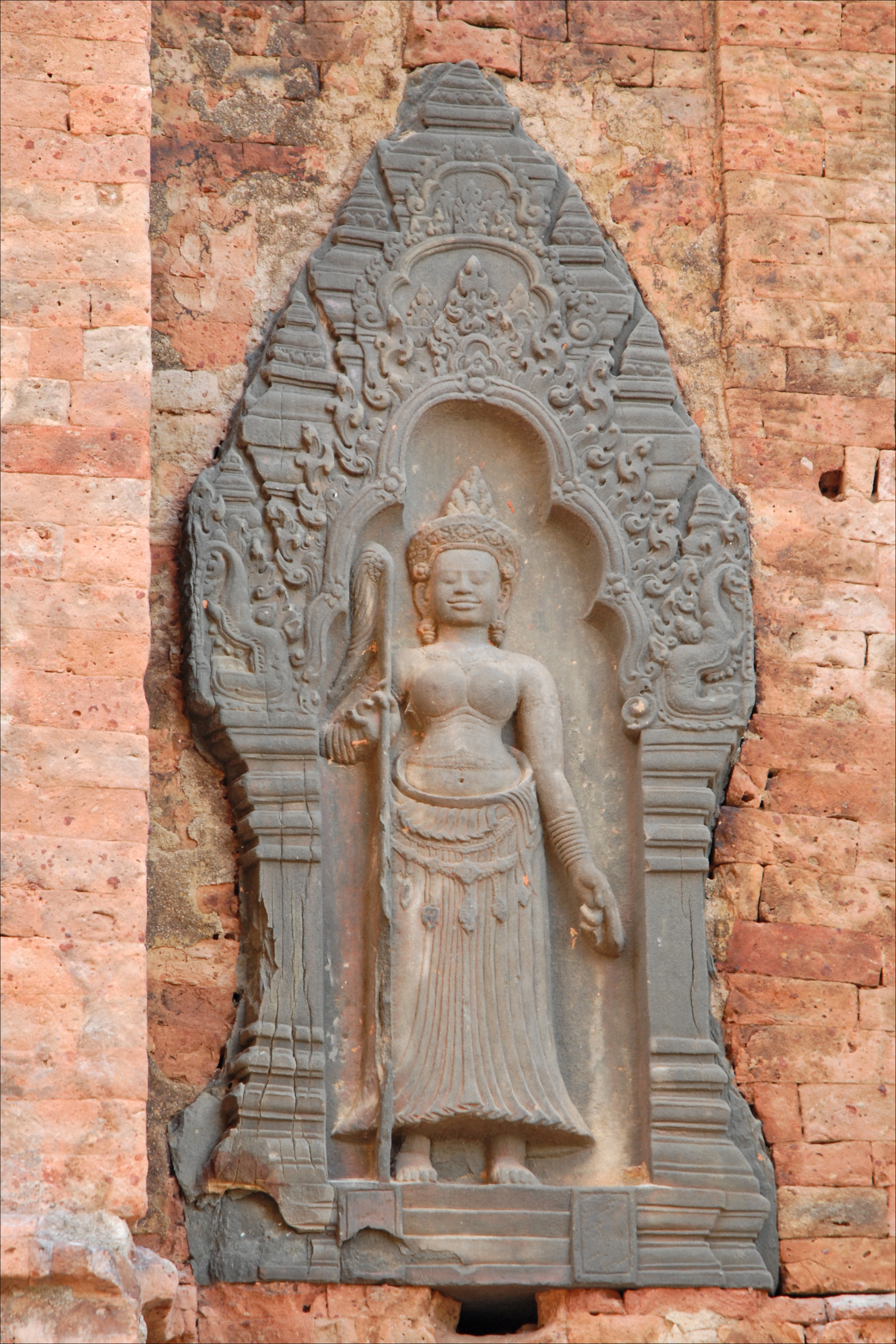

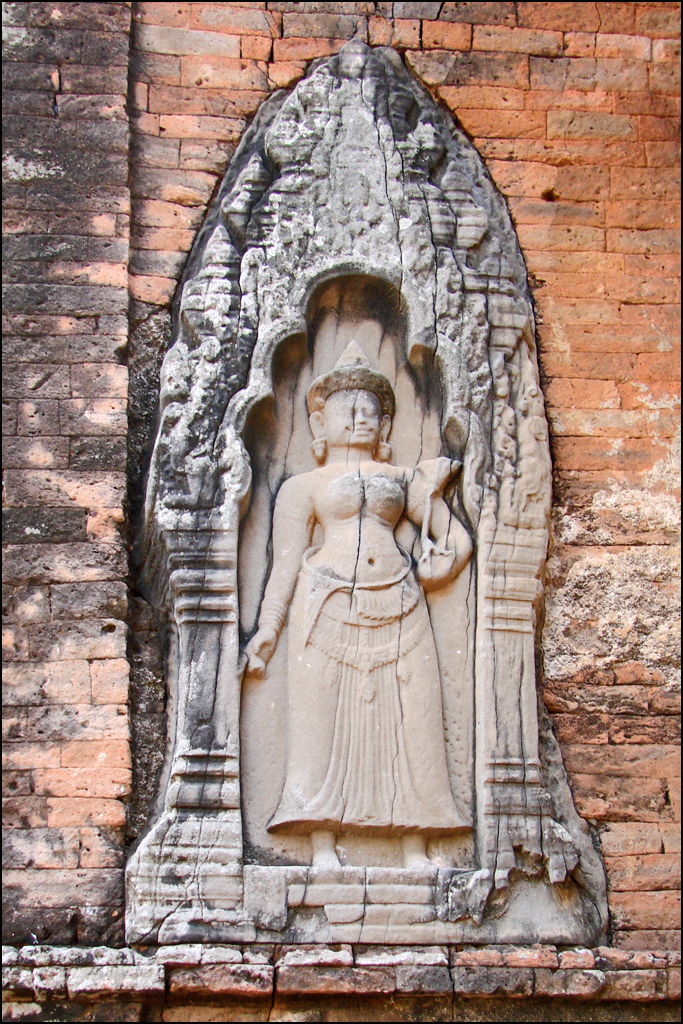

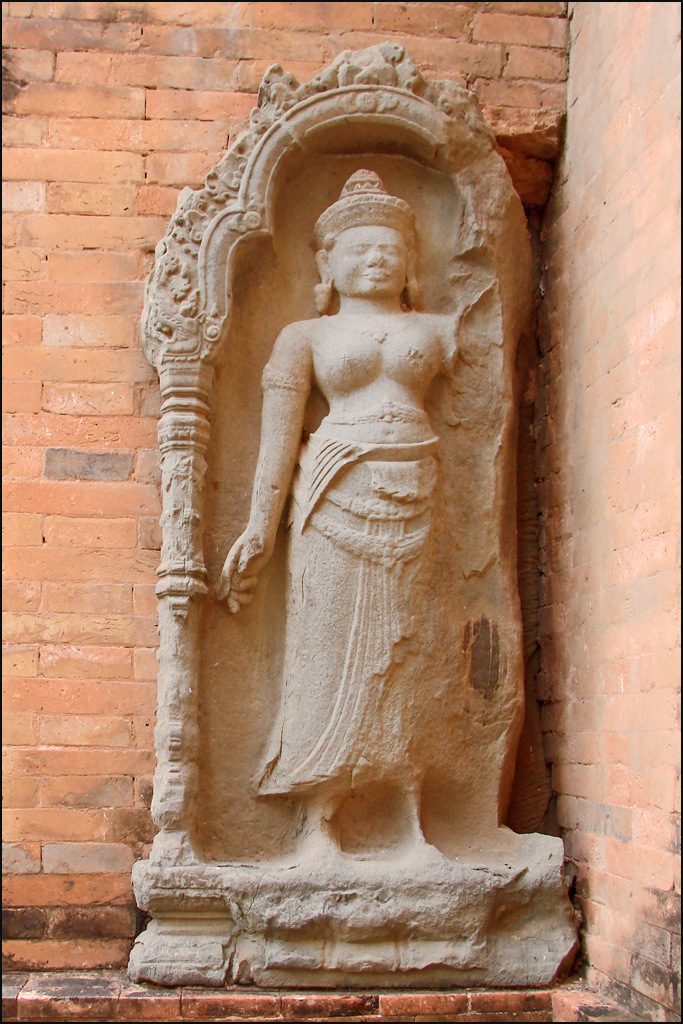

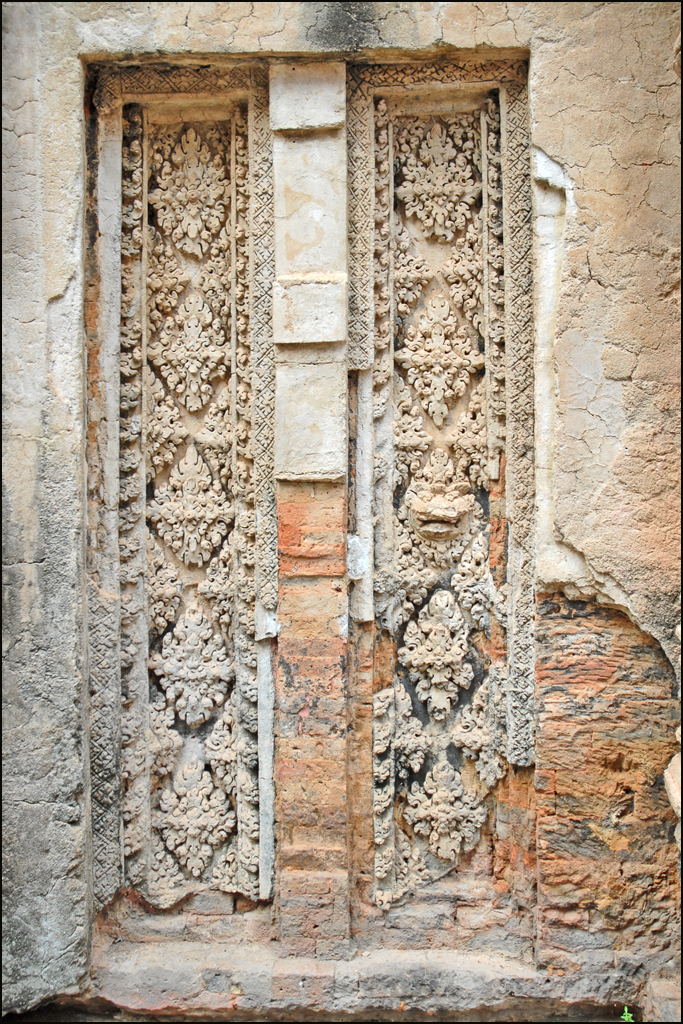

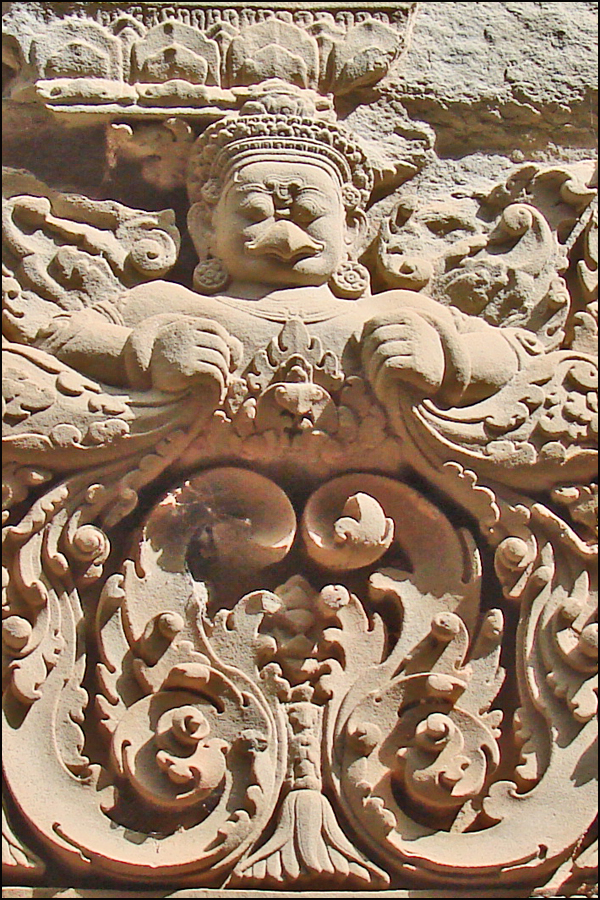

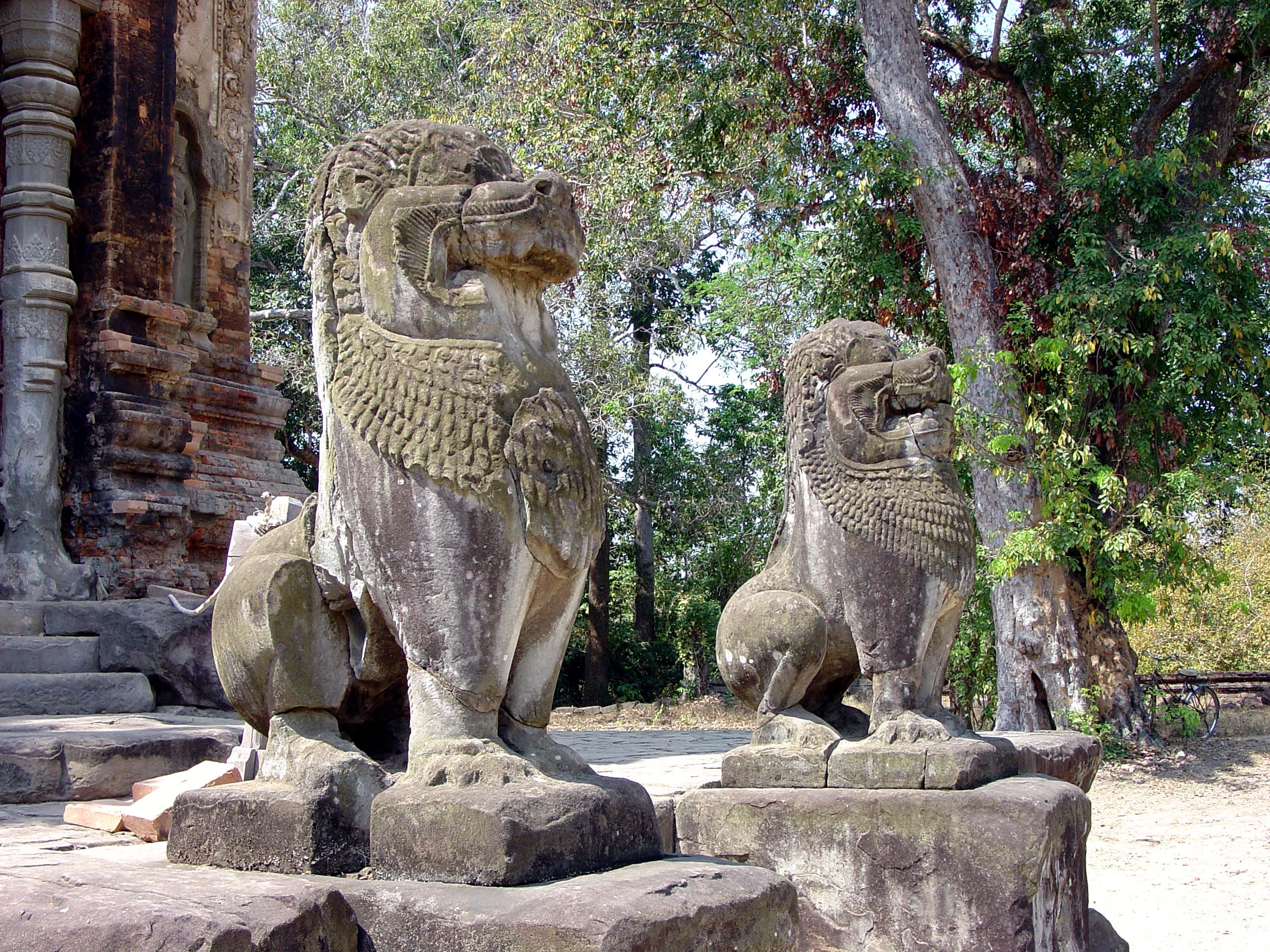

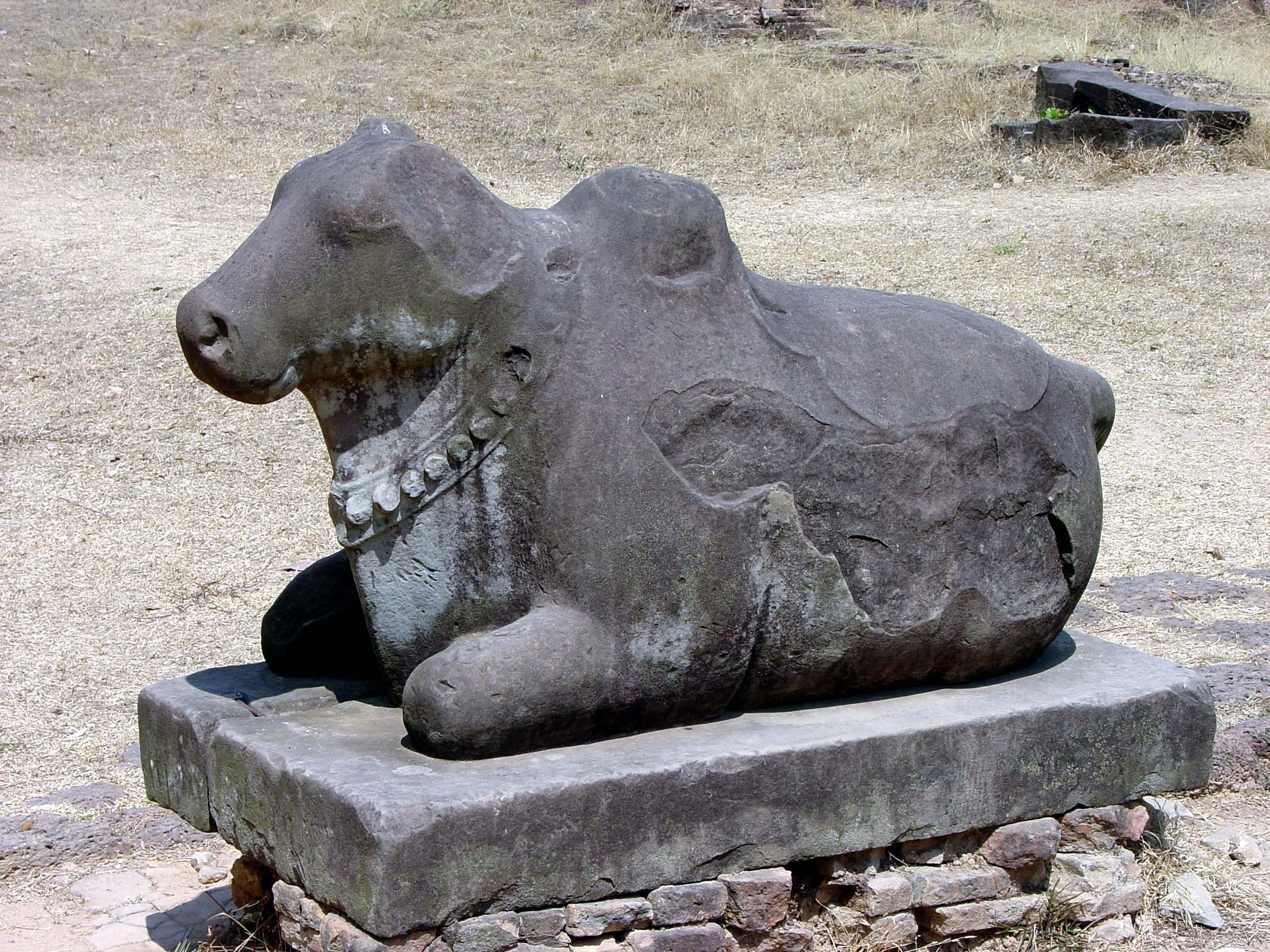

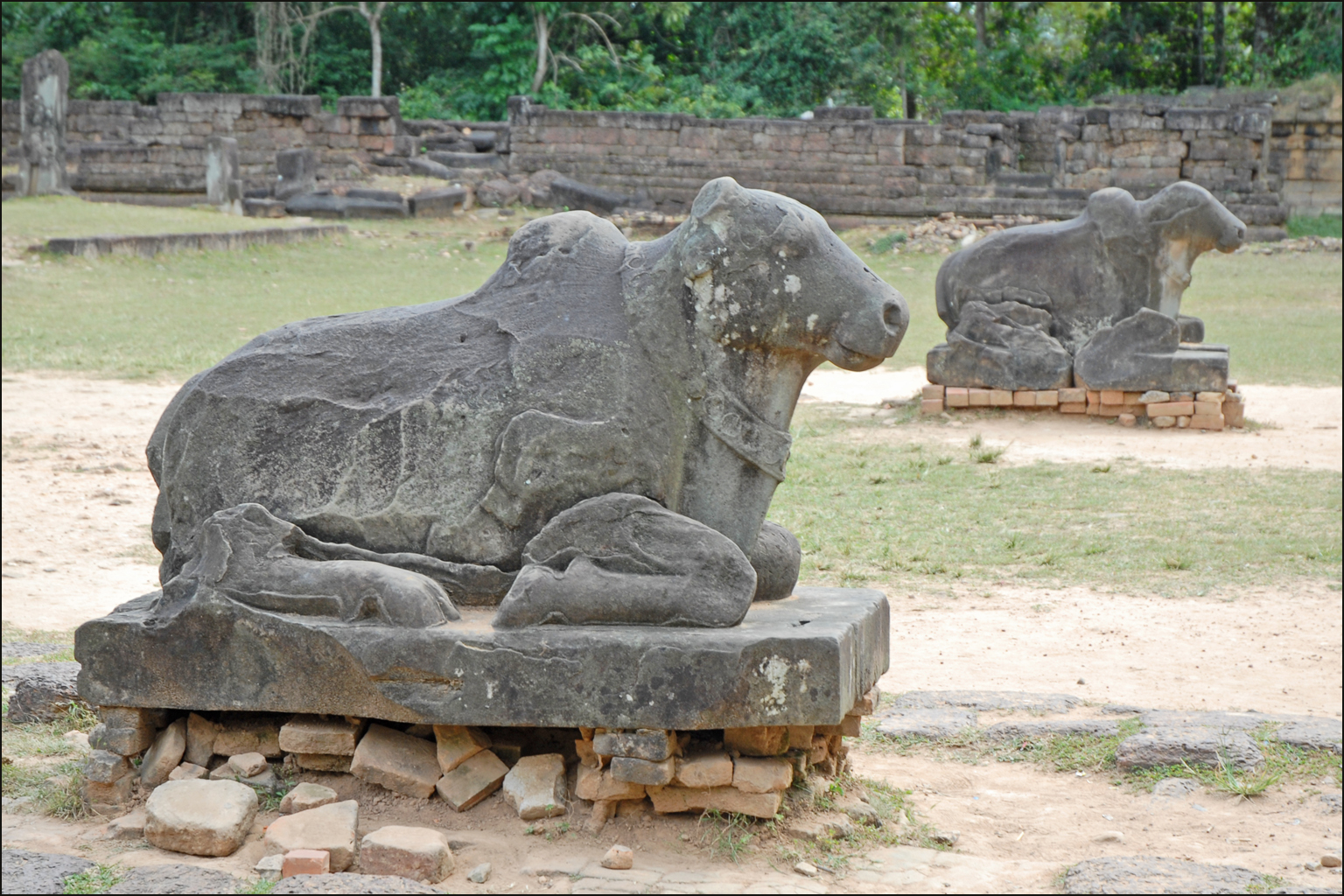

== See also ==
- Legend of Preah Ko Preah Keo
- Roluos (temples)
- Angkor
- Architecture of Cambodia
- Hariharalaya
- Bakong
- Lolei
