= Jayavarman III =

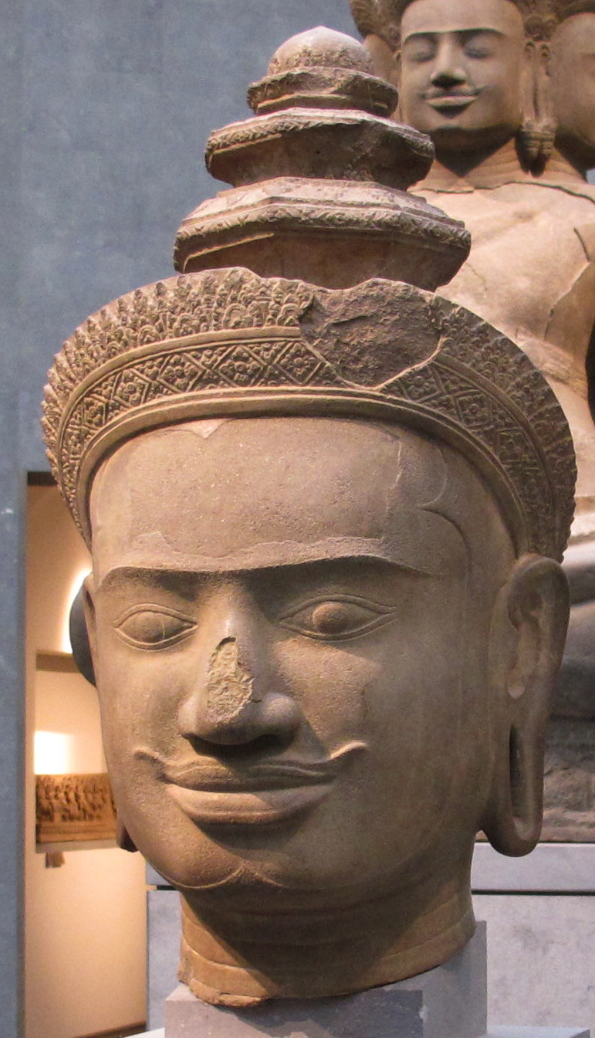

King of the Khmer Empire
- Reign: 850 – 877
- Predecessor: Jayavarman II
- Successor: Indravarman I
- Died: 877
- House: Varman Dynasty
- Father: Jayavarman II
- Religion: Hinduism

Jayavarman III (Khmer: ជ័យវរ្ម័នទី៣) or Vishnuloka was the second ruler of the Khmer Empire. A son and successor of Jayavarman II, very little is known about him. He died in 877, probably while chasing a wild elephant.

There are some temples dated to his reign though none has inscriptions attributing their construction to him. He may have begun a small construction project which was overshadowed by his more ambitious successor and builder, Indravarman I. The future Khmer king, Yasovarman I, claimed to be related to the brother of Jayavarman III's grandmother, Rudravarman. An inscription from Prasat Sak describes: "When he failed to capture a wild elephant while hunting, a divinity promised that he would secure the animal if he built a sanctuary."

Preceded by Jayavarman II	King of the Khmers; 835–877	Succeeded by Indravarman I
