= Indravarman I =

9th-century ruler of the Khmer Empire

King of the Khmer Empire
- Reign: 877/878 – 889/890
- Predecessor: Jayavarman III
- Successor: Yaśovarman I
- Died: 889/890
- Spouse: Indradevi
- Issue: Yasovarman I
- Father: Pṛthivīndravarman
- Mother: Pṛthivīndradevī
- Religion: Hinduism

Indravarman I (Khmer: ឥន្រ្ទវរ្ម័នទី១) was a ruler of the Khmer Empire who reigned from Hariharalaya between 877/78 and 889/890 CE.

== Indravarman's ancestors ==
According to the inscriptions of the Preah Ko temple, consecrated on Monday 25 January 880 CE, (Foundation stele K. 713 a) three pairs of temple towers for three deceased kings and their wives were built by him as a kind of memorial temple, as can be seen by the inscriptions on the door frames of the towers. The central towers were dedicated to Jayavarman II under his posthumous name Parameśvara and his queen Dharaṇīndradevī (K. 320a), the northern ones for Rudravarman (consecrated as Rudreśvara) and Rajendradevī (K. 318a), his mother's parents, and the southern towers for Pṛthivīndravarman (desecrated as Pṛthivīndreśvara) and Pṛthivīndradevī (K. 315 a) and K. 713 b).

Indravarman I's wife, Indradevi I, was a descendant of the royal families of Sambhupura, Vyadhapura, and Aninditapura (Funan).

== Pṛthivīndravarman and Rudravarman ==
Actually the classical succession of kings in the 9th century was disputed by some epigraphists such as Kamaleswar Bhattacharya and Karl-Heinz Golzio. Since the poor activity and records of Jayavarman III, and the presence of the dedicated towers of Preah Ko, they had interpreted some Sanskrit inscriptions at Roluos as proof of existence of two kings between him and Indravarman: Rudravarman and Pṛthivīndravarman.

According to the Lolei inscription K. 324 of Indravarman's successor Yaśovarman I, dated 8 July 893 AD, Rudravarman was the younger brother of the mother of 'Dharaṇīndradevī, the queen consort of Jayavarman II and mother of Jayavarman III (whom Indravarman mentioned under his posthumous name Viṣṇuloka in his Bakong inscription K. 826 stanza XXX, dated 881/82 AD.

Although Michael Vickery, has pointed out that they are not mentioned in later times and that these "-varman" ancestors of Indravarman may easily be explained as posthumous upgrading of the king's parents, which perhaps already occurred within their lifetimes, the following facts should be taken into account: 1) The inscriptions of the 9th century gave an account of events, i.e. genealogies and relative chronologies, referring to that century itself; 2) One should have great doubts concerning the reliability of later inscriptions that record wrong reign dates and stories about family connections never heard of before, which was pointed out especially by Vickery; 3) later inscriptions omitted very often not only these two kings, but also other important kings (Jayavarman IV mentioned only his three predecessors; Rājendravarman II, the founder of a new dynasty, has omitted in his Bàksĕi Čaṃkrŏṅ inscription K. 286, dated 23 February 948, all his predecessors with the exception of Jayavarman II and Jayavarman III); 4) In the 9th century the "-varman"-title was exclusively reserved for kings (by the way, Rudravarman was no father of a king); 5) It is surprising that later inscriptions were considered more trustworthy than contemporary ones, thus twisting things instead of following a historio-critical method.

== Indravarman's monuments and public buildings ==
While Jayavarman II was credited for the founding of the Khmer Empire ca. 800 CE, Indravarman I was credited for an extensive building program. He set the foundations for the future Angkorian kings to follow. The king's first act was to perform a public service for his subjects by building an irrigation network for the rice fields. The goal was usually achieved by constructing a large reservoir to retain water during the monsoon season and then release it during the dry season through a network of canals and channels. In Hindu mythology, the reservoir also represents an ocean and the temple-mountain represents Mount Meru, the home of the gods. The king and his brahmin advisors performed many rituals throughout the year to reinforce this belief; for example, the ritual of rain-making performed before the rice-planting season. Immediately after Indravarman I acceded, he declared in his Preah Ko inscription: "In five days from today I shall begin digging, etc." Dig he did with a reservoir of an immense size: the Indratāṭaka was the biggest reservoir ever built before his time, being 3.8 kilometres (2.4 mi) long by 800 metres (2,600 ft) wide. However, later rulers out-built him and made his reservoir look small. Now dry, it could have held about 7.5 million cubic metres of water during the monsoon season.

The king's second act was to build shrines and dedicate them to gods and ancestors. At his capital city Hariharālaya, Roluos at present, Indravarman I built Preah Ko, which he dedicated to his maternal father and grandfather, and the dynasty founder Jayavarman II. His palace was located at Prei Monti.

The king's third act was to build a temple-mountain (or complete a construction begun by Jayavarman III) where he placed a lingam dedicated to his patron Hindu deity Shiva. Cœdès identified thirteen Angkorian kings after Indravarman built such shrines for these dual purposes (state and memorial shrine). The shrines were built with stepped pyramids surrounded by lakes. In the centre of the capital of Hariharālaya, Indravarman I built Bakong surrounded by double-walled moats. The Bakong was his state shrine, therefore, it also housed the official Shiva's liṅga. Although his shrines are bigger than his predecessors, they are modest compared to the later shrines. It was also the first time in Khmer architecture that nāgas were employed as guardians for the bridge between the human world and the temple, house of gods.

== Succession ==
Indravarman I died in 889, receiving the posthumous name Isvaraloka, and was succeeded by his son Yaśovarman I.

== Notes ==
Preceded by Pṛthivīndravarman	Emperor of Angkor; 877–889/90	Succeeded by Yaśovarman I
