= Khmer architecture =

Architecture built by the Khmer during the Angkor period

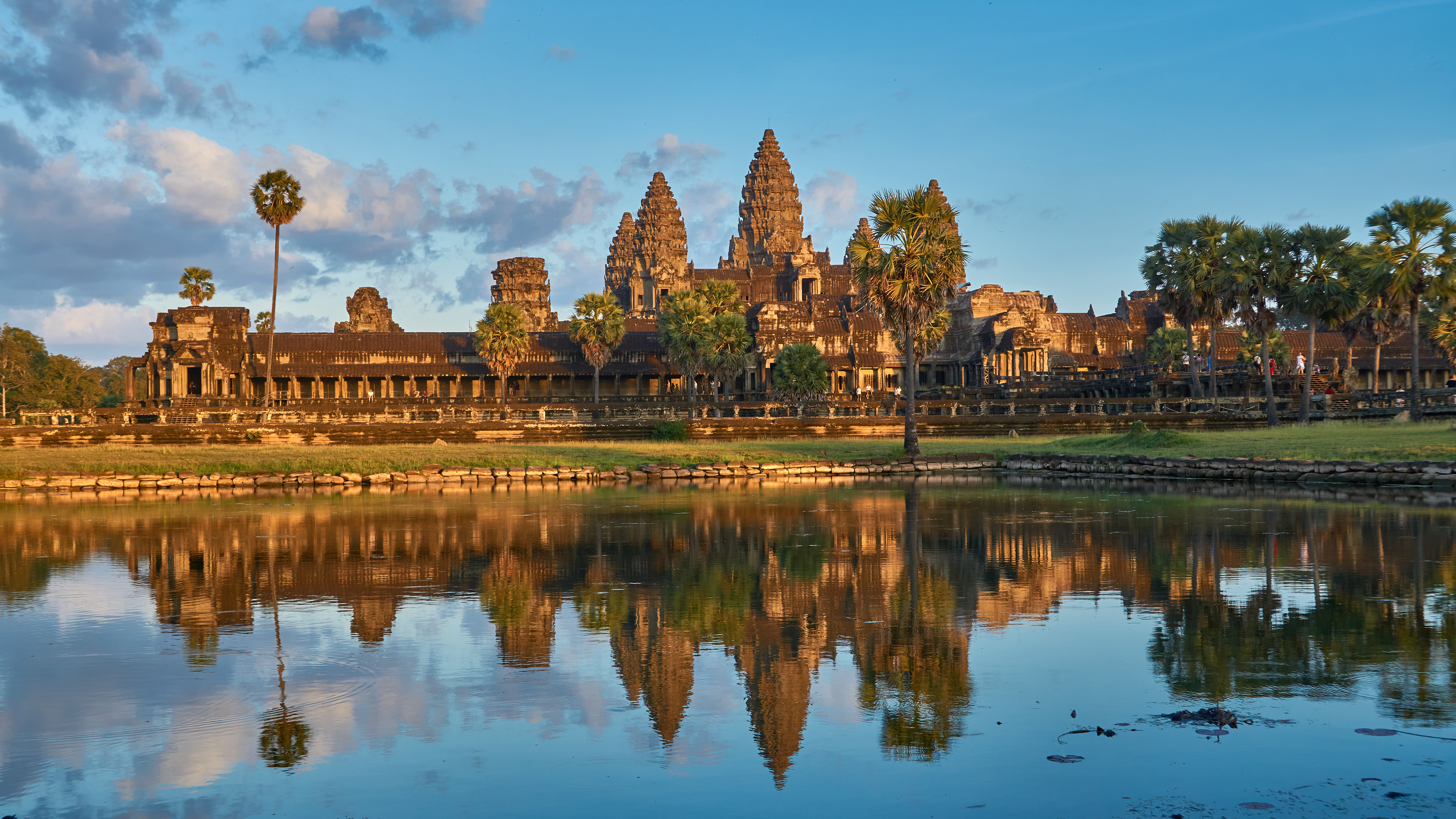
The 12th-century temple of Angkor Wat is the masterpiece of Angkorian architecture. Constructed under the direction of the Khmer king Suryavarman II, Angkor Wat was a Hindu temple, now converted into a Theravada Buddhist temple.

Khmer architecture (Khmer: ស្ថាបត្យកម្មខ្មែរ), also known as Angkorian architecture (Khmer: ស្ថាបត្យកម្មសម័យអង្គរ), is the architecture produced by the Khmer during the Angkor period of the Khmer Empire from approximately the later half of the 8th century CE to the first half of the 15th century CE.

The architecture of the Indian rock-cut temples, particularly in sculpture, had an influence on Southeast Asia and was widely adopted into the Indianised architecture of Cambodian (Khmer), Annamese and Javanese temples (of the Greater India). Evolved from Indian influences, Khmer architecture became clearly distinct from that of the Indian sub-continent as it developed its own special characteristics, some of which were created independently and others of which were incorporated from neighboring cultural traditions, resulting in a new artistic style in Asian architecture unique to the Angkorian tradition. The development of Khmer architecture as a distinct style is particularly evident in artistic depictions of divine and royal figures with facial features representative of the local Khmer population, including rounder faces, broader brows, and other physical characteristics. In any study of Angkorian architecture, the emphasis is necessarily on religious architecture, since all the remaining Angkorian buildings are religious in nature. During the period of Angkor, only temples and other religious buildings were constructed of stone.

Non-religious buildings such as dwellings were constructed of perishable materials such as wood, and so have not survived. The religious architecture of Angkor has characteristic structures, elements, and motifs, which are identified in the glossary below. Since a number of different architectural styles succeeded one another during the Angkorean period, not all of these features were equally in evidence throughout the period. Indeed, scholars have referred to the presence or absence of such features as one source of evidence for dating the remains.

== Periodization ==
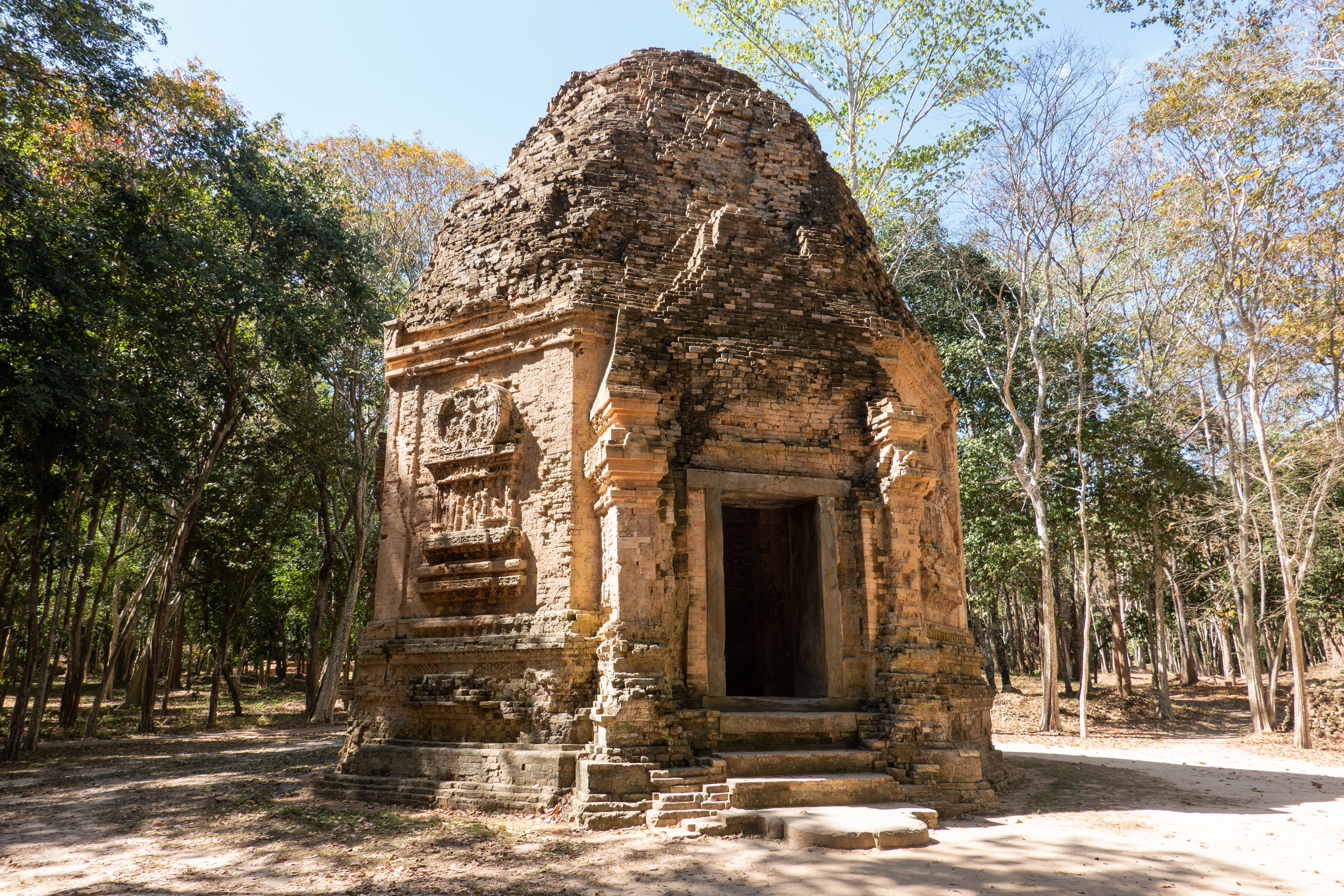
Sambor Prei Kuk

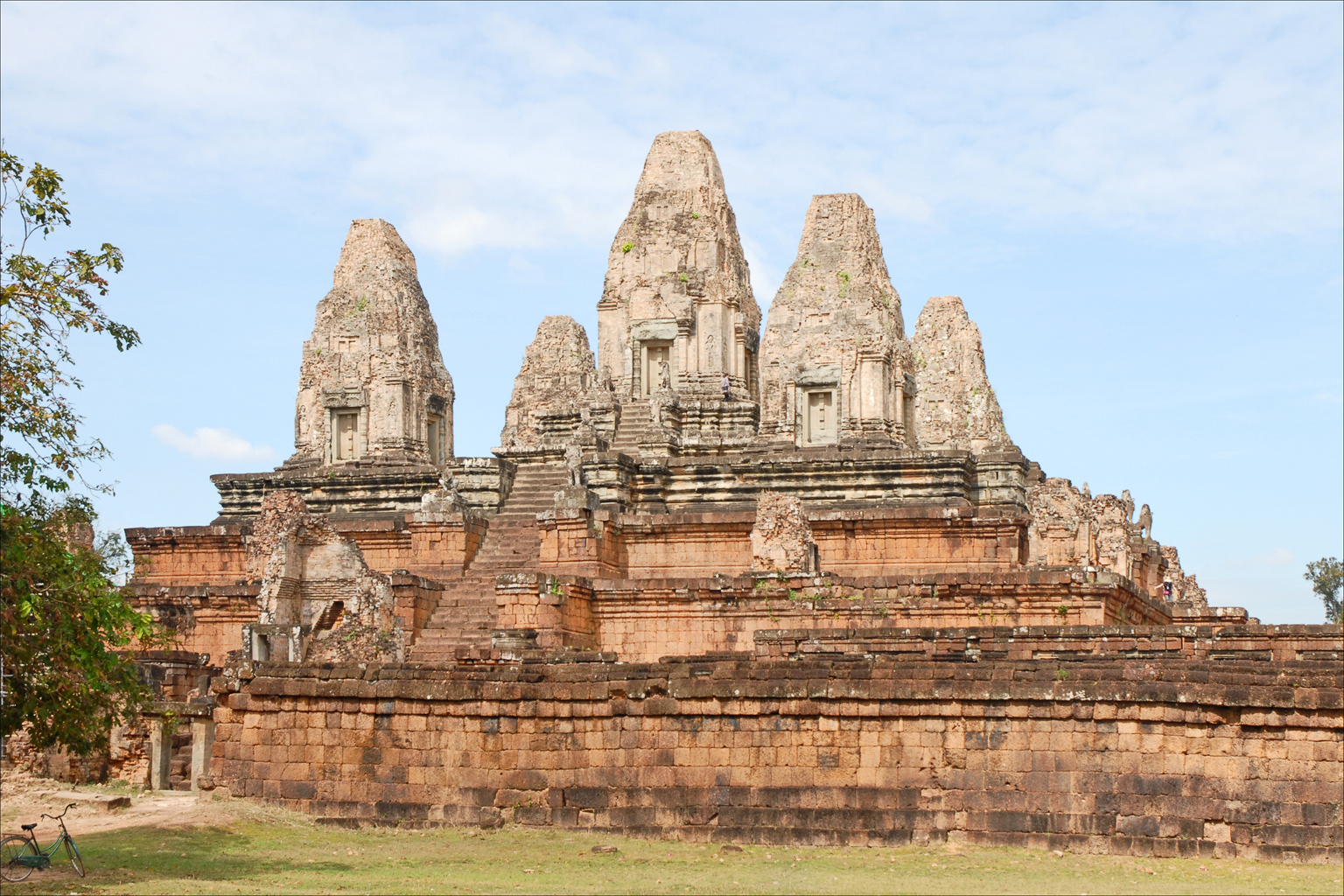
Pre Rup

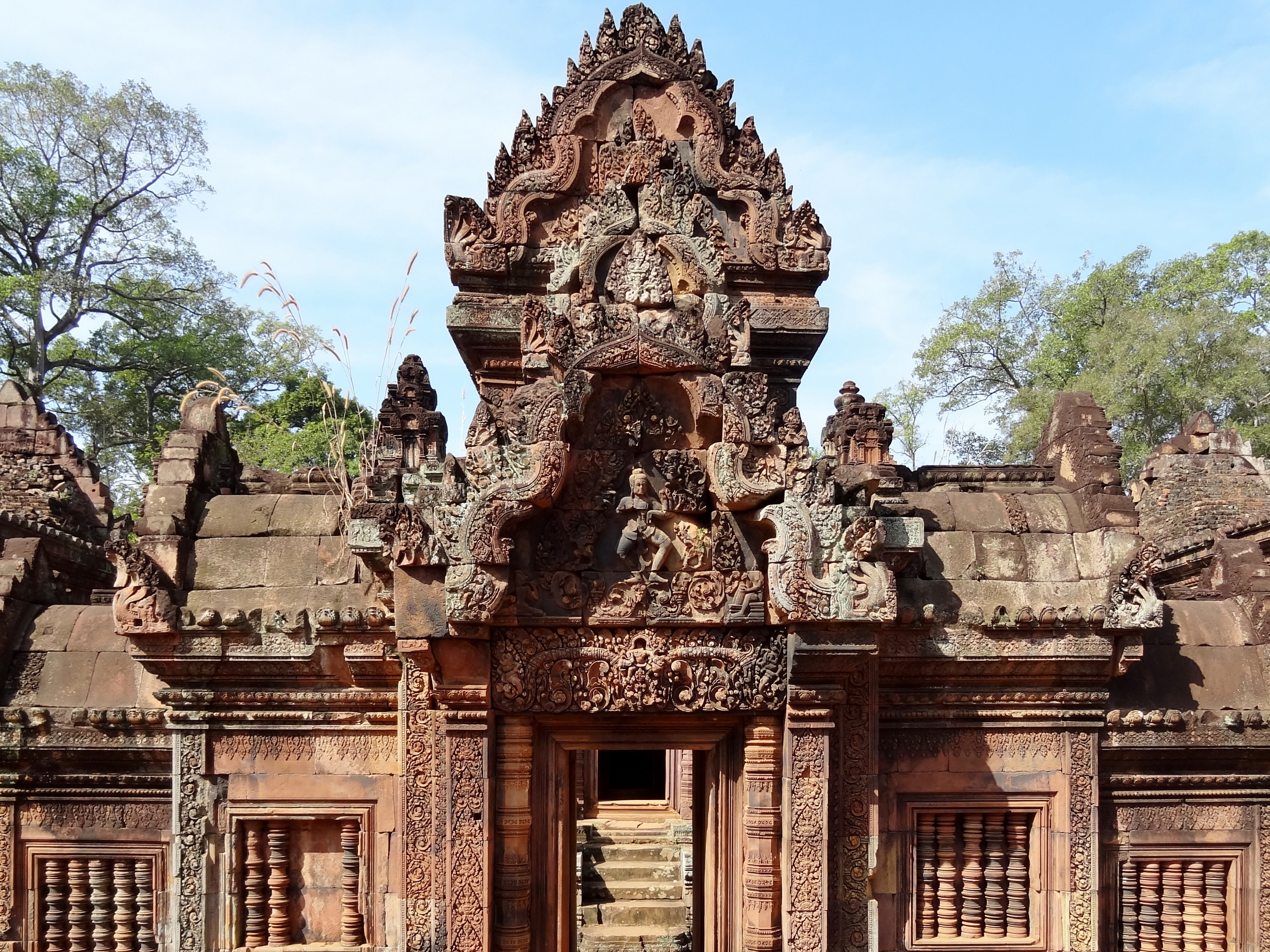
Banteay Srei

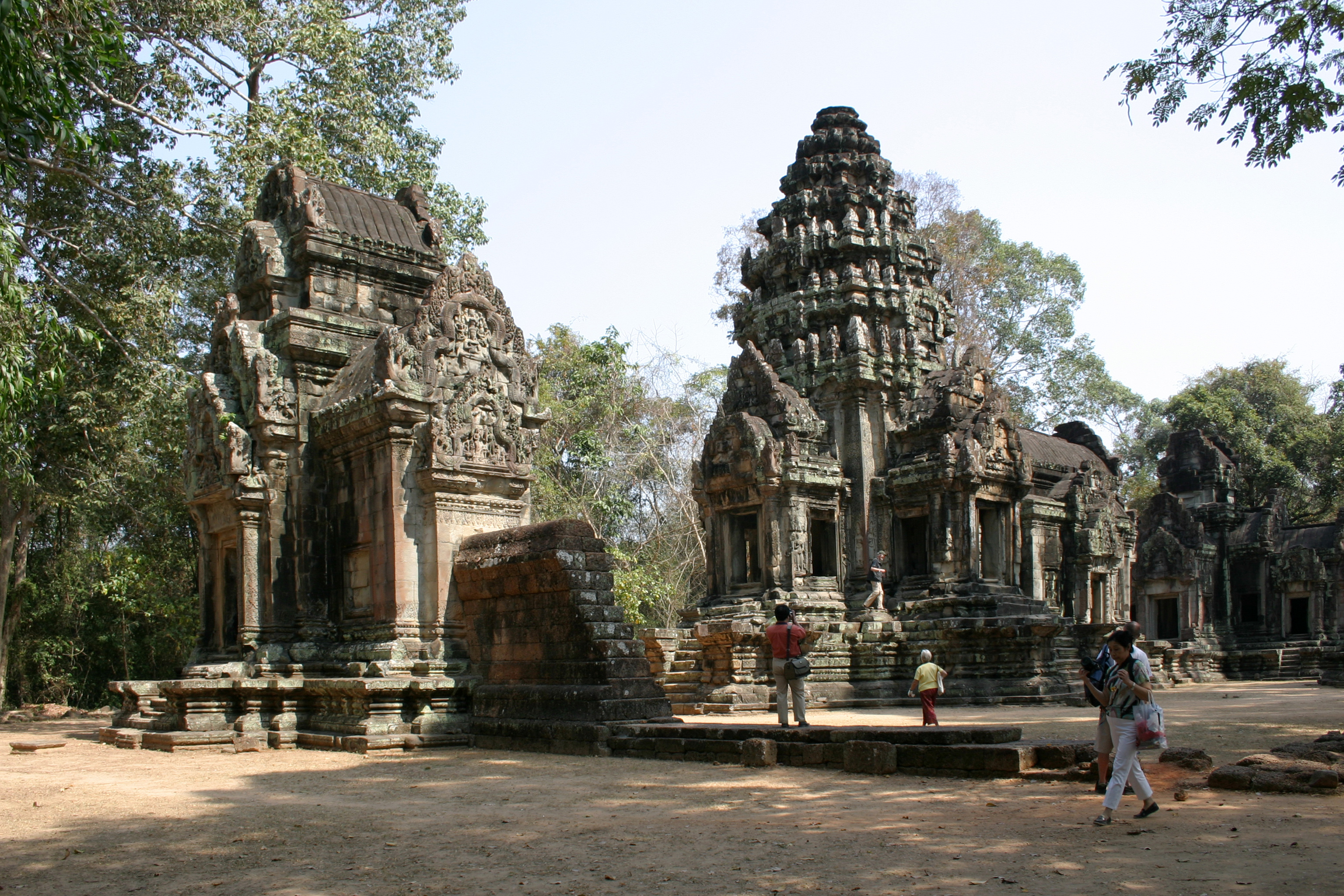
Thommanon

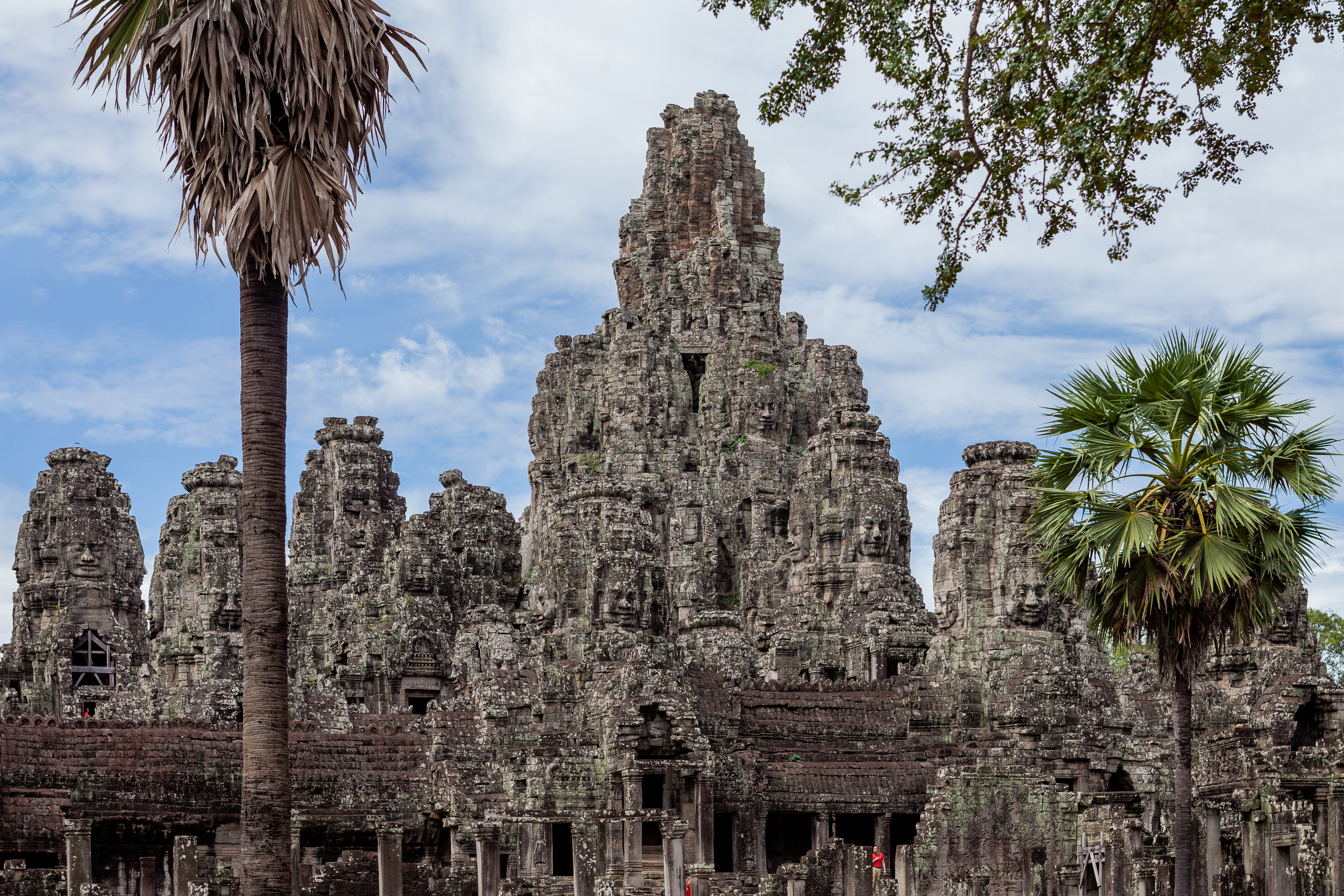
Bayon

Many temples had been built before Cambodia became the powerful Khmer Empire which dominated a large part of mainland Southeast Asia. At that time, Khmer was known as the Chenla kingdom, the predecessor state of the Khmer empire.

Latest research reveals that the Khmer already erected stone buildings in the protohistoric period, which they used for the worship of mighty tutelary spirits. This earliest extant architecture consists of relatively small cells made from prefabricated megalithic construction parts, which probably date at least from the second century BC.

There are three pre-Angkorean architectural styles:

- Sambor Prei Kuk style (610–650): Sambor Prei Kuk, also known as Isanapura, was the capital of the Chenla Kingdom. Temples of Sambor Prei Kuk were built in rounded, plain colonettes with capitals that include a bulb.
- Prei Khmeng style (635–700): structures reveal masterpieces of sculpture but examples are scarce. Colonettes are larger than those of previous styles. Buildings were more heavily decorated but had general decline in standards.
- Kompong Preah style (700–800): temples with more decorative rings on colonettes which remain cylindrical. Brick constructions were being continued.

Scholars have worked to develop a periodization of Angkorean architectural styles. The following periods and styles may be distinguished. Each is named for a particular temple regarded as paradigmatic for the style.

- Kulen style (825–875): continuation of pre-Angkorean style but it was a period of innovation and influence from Cham temples. Tower is mainly square and relatively high as well as brick with laterite walls and stone door surrounds but square and octagonal colonettes begin to appear.
- Preah Ko style (877–886): Hariharalaya was the first capital city of the Khmer empire located in the area of Angkor; its ruins are in the area now called Roluos some fifteen kilometers southeast of the modern city of Siem Reap. The earliest surviving temple of Hariharalaya is Preah Ko; the others are Bakong and Lolei. The temples of the Preah Ko style are known for their small brick towers and for the great beauty and delicacy of their lintels.
- Bakheng style (889–923): Bakheng was the first temple mountain constructed in the area of Angkor proper north of Siem Reap. It was the state temple of King Yasovarman, who built his capital of Yasodharapura around it. Located on a hill (phnom), it is currently one of the most endangered of the monuments.
- Koh Ker style (921–944): during the reign of King Jayavarman IV, capital of Khmer empire was removed from Angkor region through the north which is called Koh Ker. The architectural style of temples in Koh Ker, scale of buildings diminishes toward center. Brick still main material but sandstone also used.
- Pre Rup style (944–968): under King Rajendravarman, the Angkorian Khmer built the temples of Pre Rup, East Mebon, and Phimeanakas. Their common style is named after the state temple mountain of Pre Rup.
- Banteay Srei style (967–1000): Banteay Srei is the only major Angkorian temple constructed not by a monarch, but by a courtier. It is known for its small scale and the extreme refinement of its decorative carvings, including several famous narrative bas-reliefs dealing with scenes from Indian mythology.
- Khleang style (968–1010): the Khleang temples, first use of galleries. Cruciform gopuras. Octagonal colonettes. Restrained decorative carving. A few temples that were built in this style are Ta Keo, Phimeanakas.
- Baphuon style (1050–1080): Baphuon, the massive temple mountain of King Udayadityavarman II was apparently the temple that most impressed the Chinese traveller Zhou Daguan, who visited Angkor toward the end of the 13th century. Its unique relief carvings have a naive dynamic quality that contrast with the rigidity of the figures typical of some other periods.
- Classical or Angkor Wat style (1080–1175): Angkor Wat, the temple and perhaps the mausoleum of King Suryavarman II, is the greatest of the Angkorian temples and defines what has come to be known as the classical style of Angkorian architecture. Other temples in this style are Banteay Samre and Thommanon in the area of Angkor, and Phimai in modern Thailand.
- Bayon style (1181–1243): in the final quarter of the 12th century, King Jayavarman VII freed the country of Angkor from occupation by an invasionary force from Champa. Thereafter, he began a massive program of monumental construction, paradigmatic for which was the state temple called the Bayon. The king's other foundations participated in the style of the Bayon, and included Ta Prohm, Preah Khan, Angkor Thom, and Banteay Thom. Though grandiose in plan and elaborately decorated, the temples exhibit a hurriedness of construction that contrasts with the perfection of Angkor Wat.
- Post Bayon style (1243–1431): following the period of frantic construction under Jayavarman VII, Angkorian architecture entered the period of its decline. The 13th century Terrace of the Leper King is known for its dynamic relief sculptures of demon kings, dancers, and nāgas.

== Materials ==
Angkorian builders used brick, sandstone, laterite and wood as their materials. The ruins that remain are of brick, sandstone and laterite, the wood elements having been lost to decay and other destructive processes.

=== Brick ===
The earliest Angkorian temples were made mainly of brick. Good examples are the temple towers of Preah Ko, Lolei and Bakong at Hariharalaya, and Chóp Mạt in Tay Ninh. Decorations were usually carved into a stucco applied to the brick, rather than into the brick itself. This was because bricks were a softer material, and did not lend themselves to sculpting, as opposed to stones of different kinds such as the Sandstones or the Granites. However, the tenets of the Sacred Architecture as enunciated in the Vedas and the Shastras, require no adhesives to be used while building blocks are assembled one over the other to create the Temples, as such bricks have been used only in relatively smaller temples such as Lolei and The Preah Ko. Besides, strength of bricks is much lesser as compared to the stones (mentioned here-in) and the former degrade with age.

Angkor's neighbor state of Champa was also the home to numerous brick temples that are similar in style to those of Angkor. The most extensive ruins are at Mỹ Sơn in Vietnam. A Cham story tells of the time that the two countries settled an armed conflict by means of a tower-building contest proposed by the Cham King Po Klaung Garai. While the Khmer built a standard brick tower, Po Klaung Garai directed his people to build an impressive replica of paper and wood.

=== Sandstone ===
The only stone used by Angkorian builders was sandstone, obtained from the Kulen mountains. Since its obtainment was considerably more expensive than that of brick, sandstone only gradually came into use, and at first was used for particular elements such as door frames. The 10th-century temple of Ta Keo is the first Angkorian temple to be constructed more or less entirely from Sandstone.

=== Laterite ===
Angkorian builders used laterite, a clay that is soft when taken from the ground but that hardens when exposed to the sun, for foundations and other hidden parts of buildings. Because the surface of laterite is uneven, it was not suitable for decorative carvings, unless first dressed with stucco. Laterite was more commonly used in the Khmer provinces than at Angkor itself. Because the water table in this entire region is well high, Laterite has been used in the underlying layers of Angkor Wat and other temples (especially the larger ones), because it can absorb water and help towards better stability of the Temple.

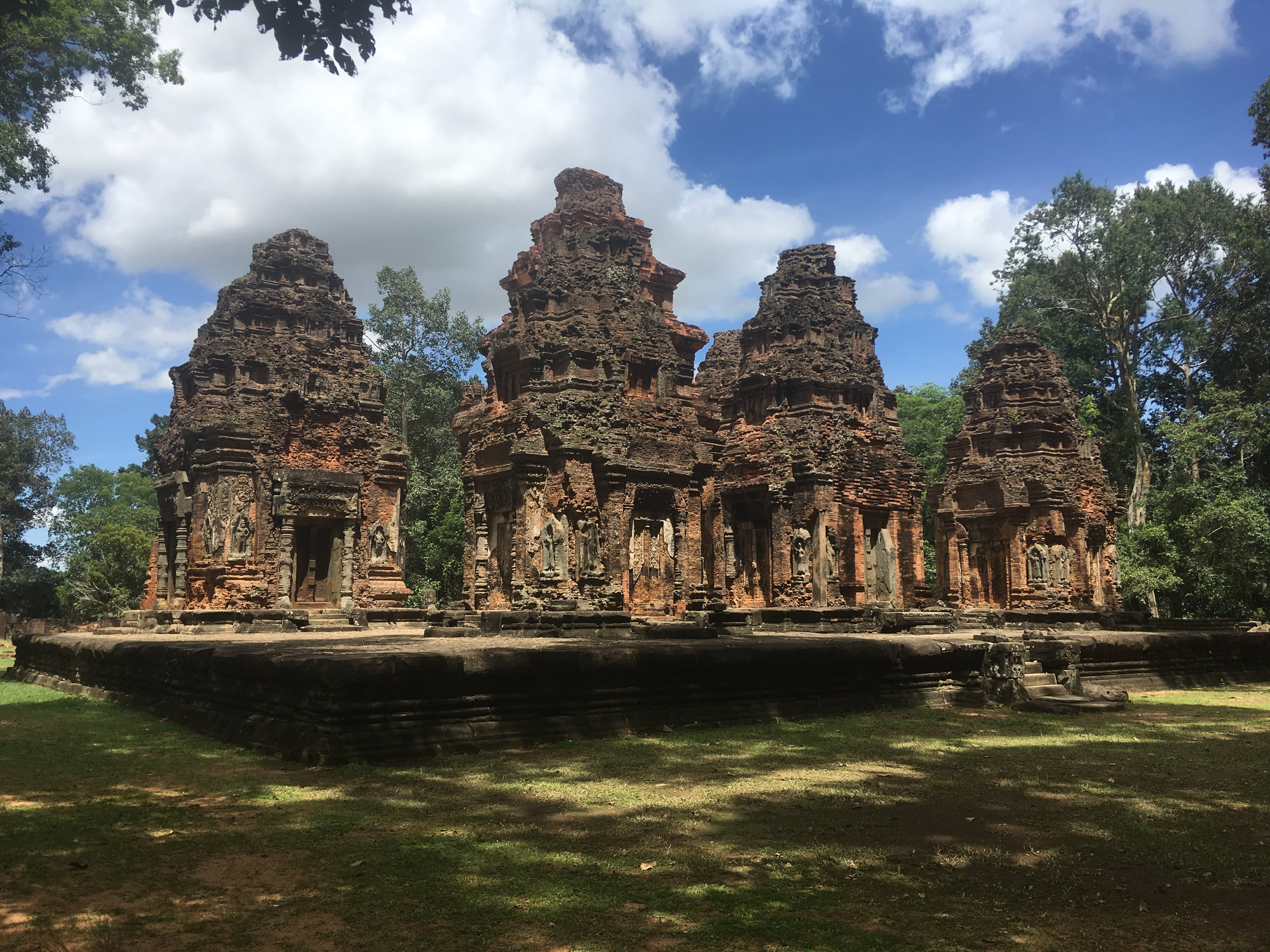
Preah Ko, completed in 879 CE, was a temple made mainly of brick.

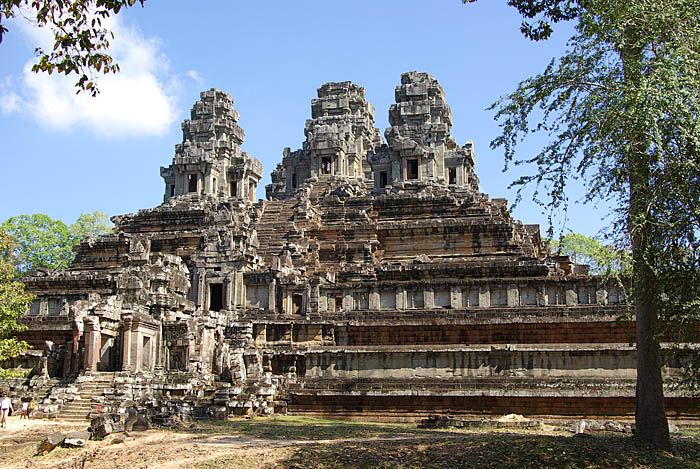
Ta Keo, a temple built in the 10th century, was constructed more or less entirely from sandstone.

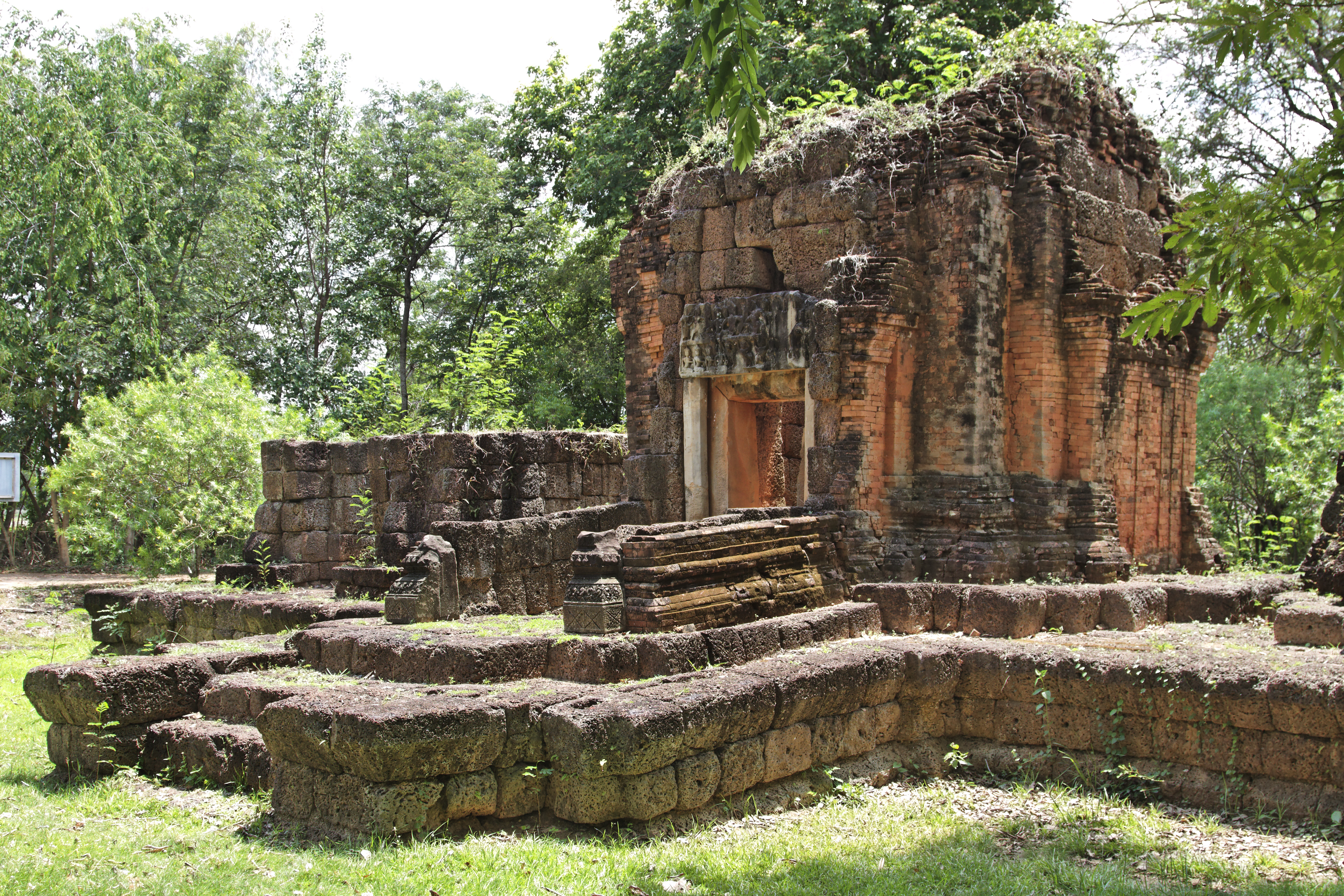
Prasat Prang Ku in Sisaket, Thailand, was built with laterite.

== Structures ==
=== Central sanctuary ===
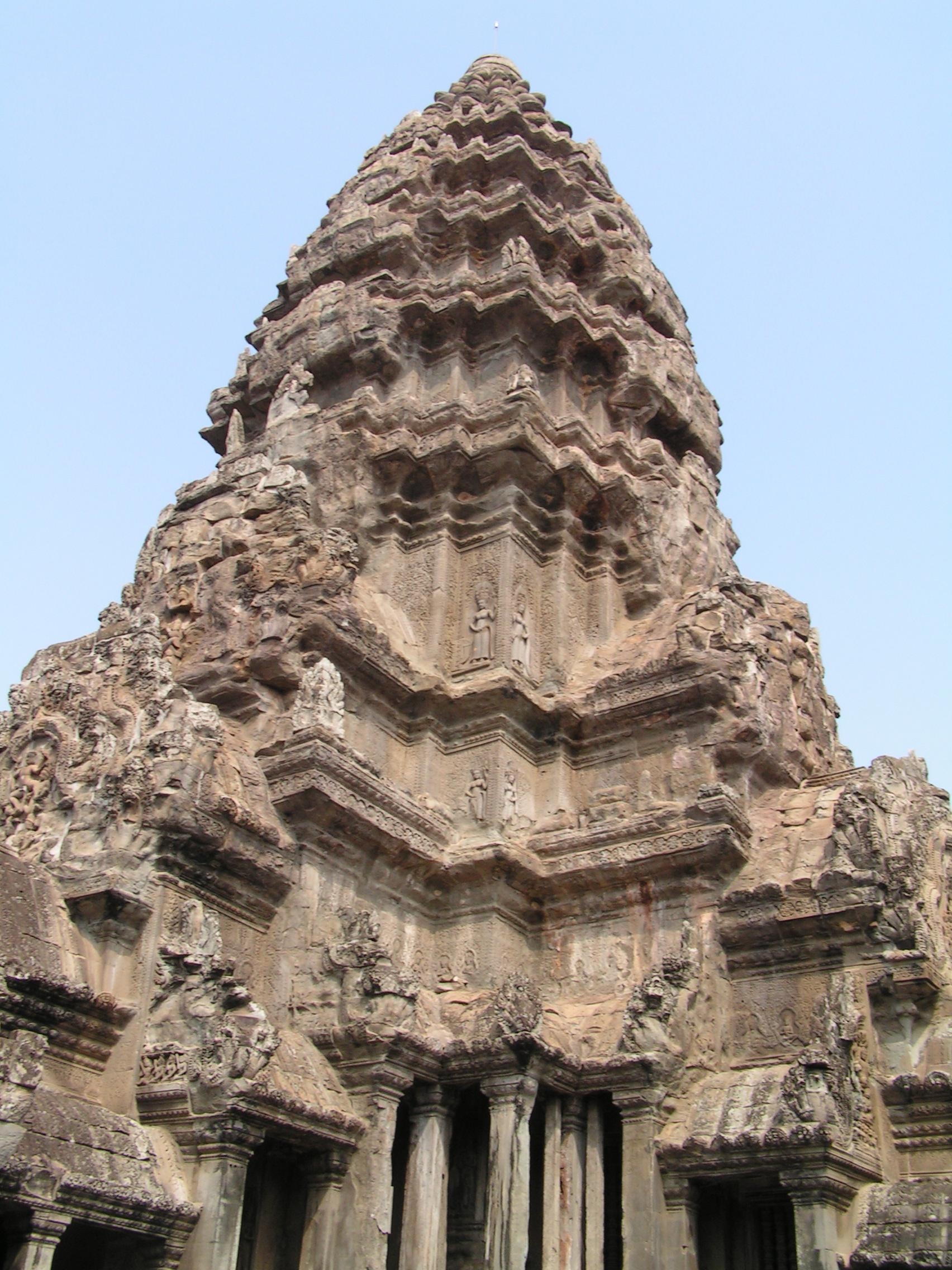
The central prang of Angkor Wat temple symbolizes the mount Meru.

The central sanctuary of an Angkorian temple was home to the temple's primary deity, the one to whom the site was dedicated: typically Shiva or Vishnu in the case of a Hindu temple, Buddha or a bodhisattva in the case of a Buddhist temple. The deity was represented by a statue (or in the case of Shiva, most commonly by a linga). Since the temple was not considered a place of worship for use by the population at large, but rather a home for the deity, the sanctuary needed only to be large enough to hold the statue or linga; it was never more than a few metres across. Its importance was instead conveyed by the height of the tower (prasat) rising above it, by its location at the centre of the temple, and by the greater decoration on its walls. Symbolically, the sanctuary represented Mount Meru, the legendary home of the Hindu gods.

=== Prang ===
The prang is the tall finger-like spire, usually richly carved, common to much Khmer religious architecture.

=== Enclosure ===
Khmer temples were typically enclosed by a concentric series of walls, with the central sanctuary in the middle; this arrangement represented the mountain ranges surrounding Mount Meru, the mythical home of the gods. Enclosures are the spaces between these walls, and between the innermost wall and the temple itself. By modern convention, enclosures are numbered from the centre outwards. The walls defining the enclosures of Khmer temples are frequently lined by galleries, while passage through the walls is by way of gopuras located at the cardinal points.

=== Gallery ===
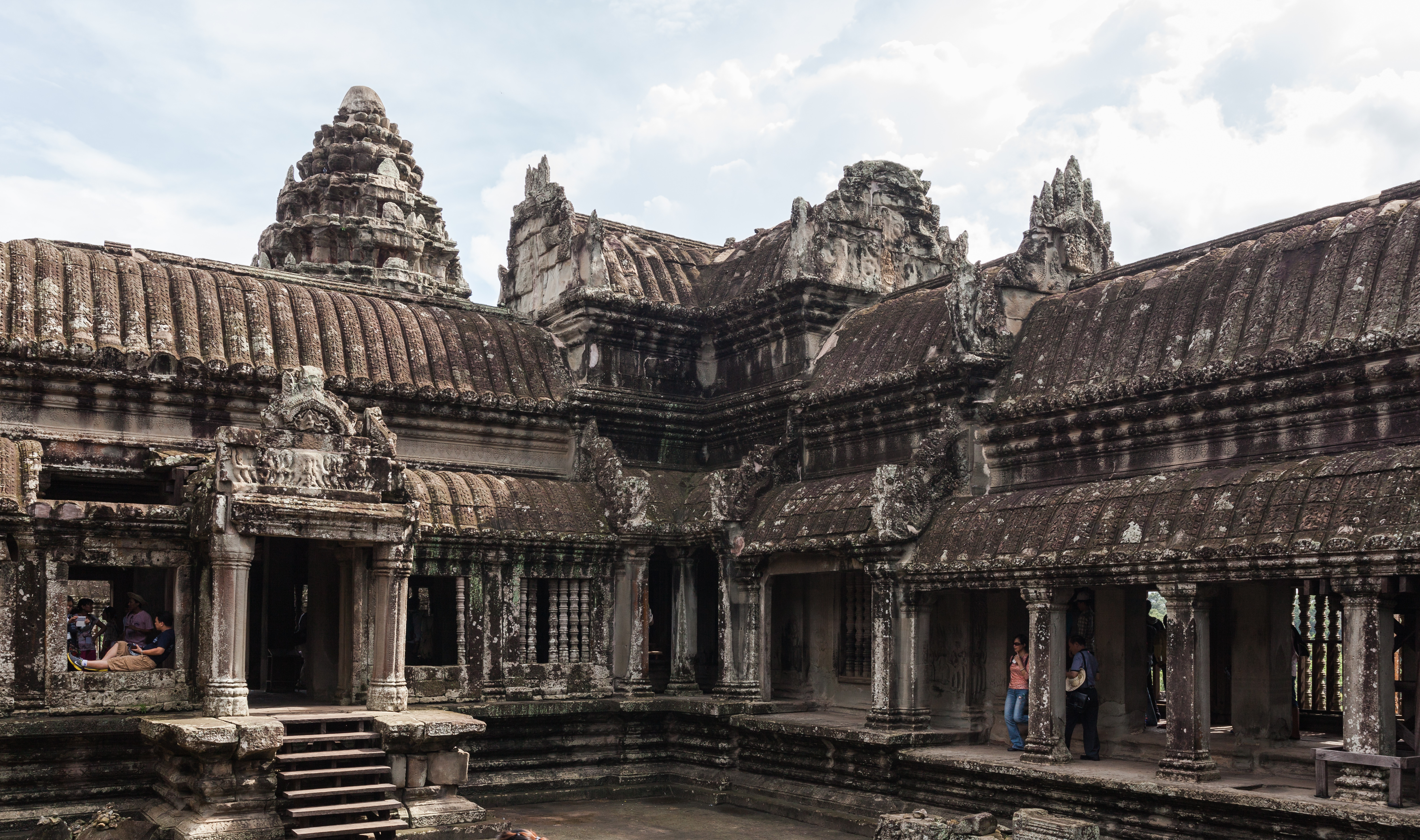
A cruciform gallery separates the courtyards at Angkor Wat.

A gallery is a passageway running along the wall of an enclosure or along the axis of a temple, often open to one or both sides. Historically, the form of the gallery evolved during the 10th century from the increasingly long hallways which had earlier been used to surround the central sanctuary of a temple. During the period of Angkor Wat in the first half of the 12th century, additional half galleries on one side were introduced to buttress the structure of the temple.

=== Gopura ===
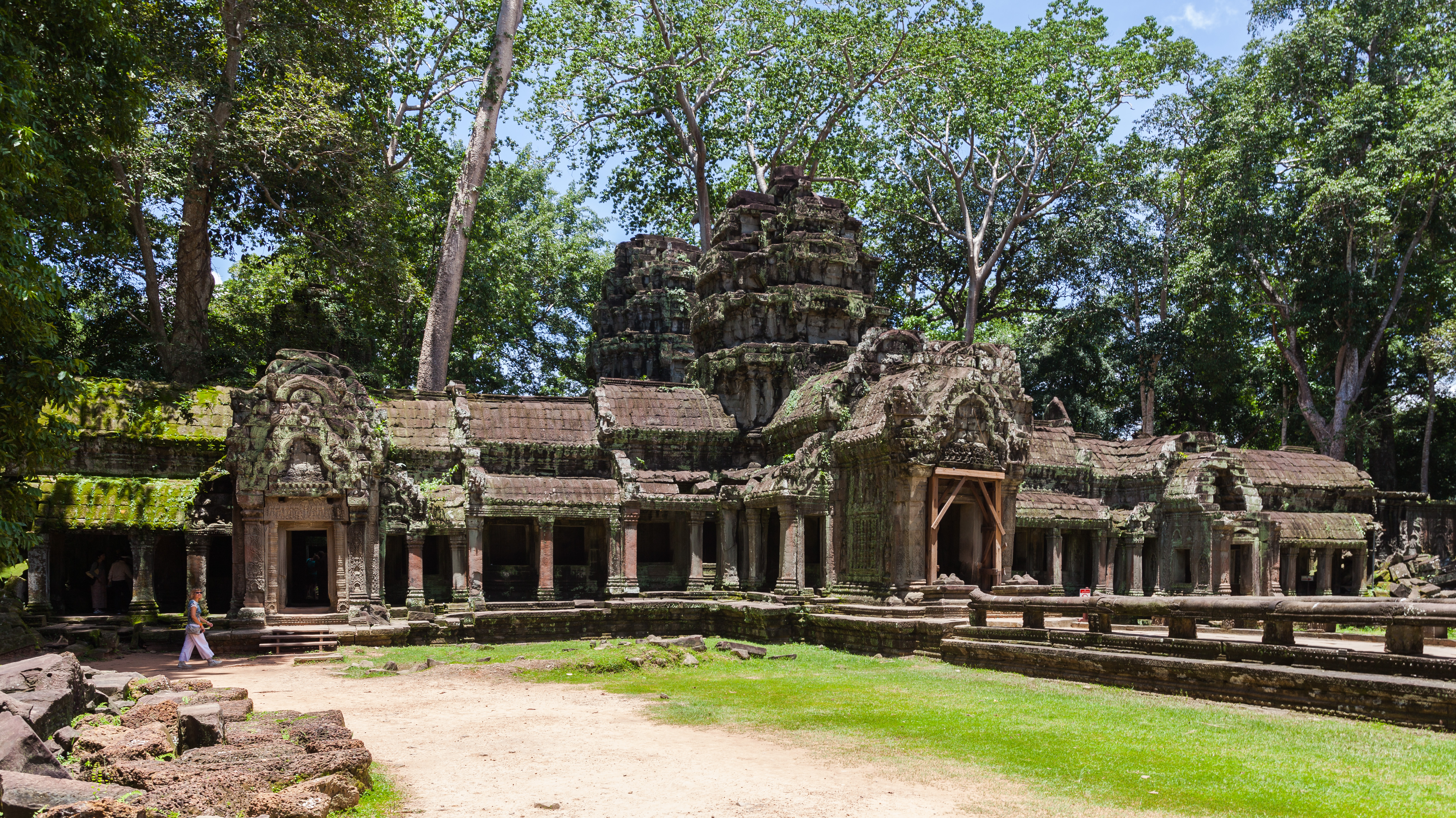
A gopura leads into the 12th-century temple compound at Ta Prohm.

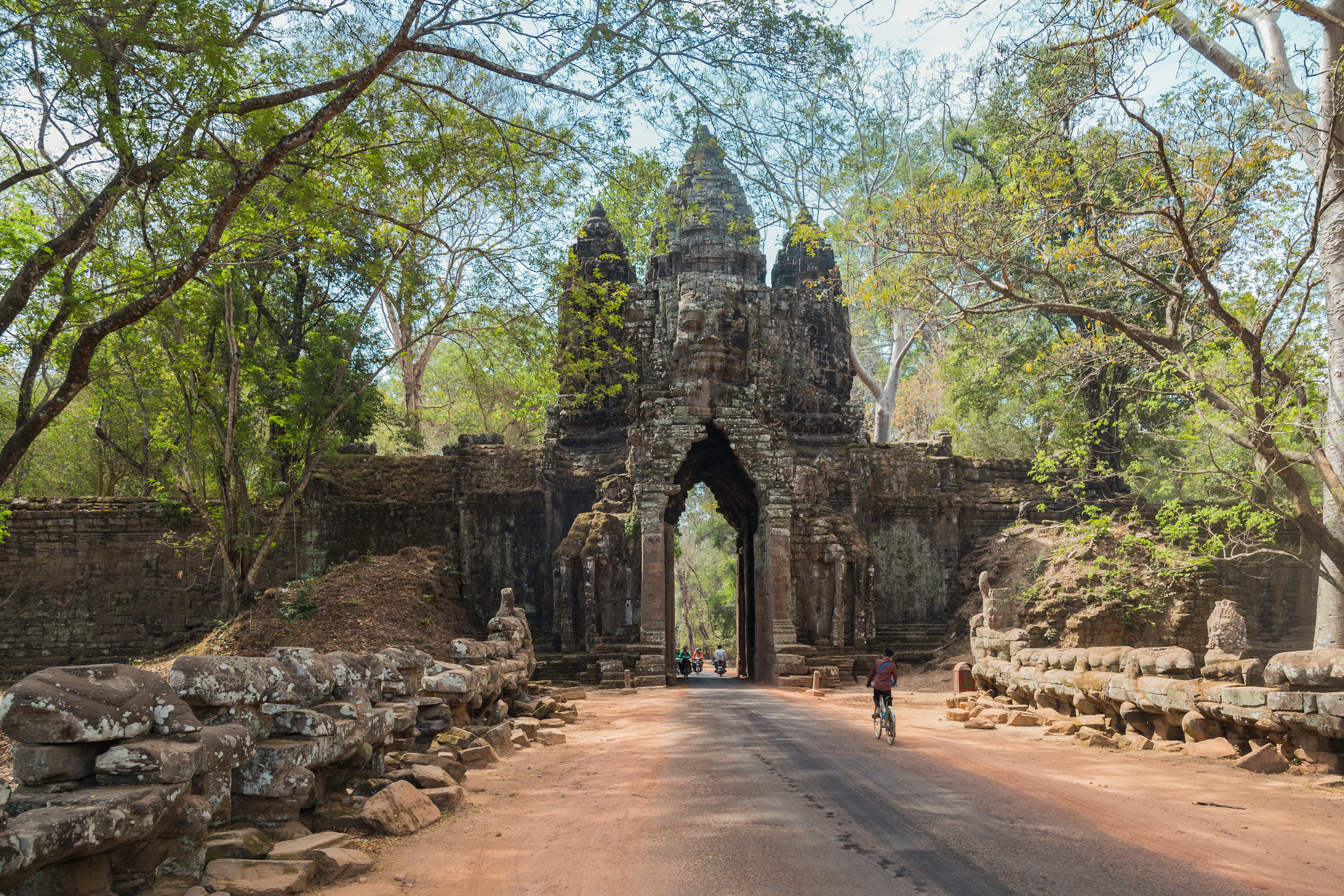
Many of the gopuras constructed under Jayavarman VII toward the end of the 12th century, such as this one at Angkor Thom, are adorned with gigantic stone faces of Avalokiteshvara.

A gopura is an entrance building. At Angkor, passage through the enclosure walls surrounding a temple compound is frequently accomplished by means of an impressive gopura, rather than just an aperture in the wall or a doorway. Enclosures surrounding a temple are often constructed with a gopura at each of the four cardinal points. In plan, gopuras are usually cross-shaped and elongated along the axis of the enclosure wall.

If the wall is constructed with an accompanying gallery, the gallery is sometimes connected to the arms of the gopura. Many Angkorian gopuras have a tower at the centre of the cross. The lintels and pediments are often decorated, and guardian figures (dvarapalas) are often placed or carved on either side of the doorways.

=== Hall of Dancers ===
A Hall of Dancers is the structure of a type found in certain late 12th-century temples constructed under King Jayavarman VII: Ta Prohm, Preah Khan, Banteay Kdei and Banteay Chhmar. It is a rectangular building elongated along the temple's east axis and divided into four courtyards by galleries. Formerly it had a roof made of perishable materials; now only the stone walls remain. The pillars of the galleries are decorated with carved designs of dancing apsaras; hence scholars have suggested that the hall itself may have been used for dancing.

=== House of Fire ===
House of Fire, or Dharmasala, is the name given to a type of building found only in temples constructed during the reign of late 12th-century monarch Jayavarman VII: Preah Khan, Ta Prohm and Banteay Chhmar. A House of Fire has thick walls, a tower at the west end and south-facing windows.

Scholars theorize that the House of Fire functioned as a "rest house with fire" for travellers. An inscription at Preah Khan tells of 121 such rest houses lining the highways into Angkor. The Chinese traveller Zhou Daguan expressed his admiration for these rest houses when he visited Angkor in 1296 CE. Another theory is that the House of Fire had a religious function as the repository the sacred flame used in sacred ceremonies.

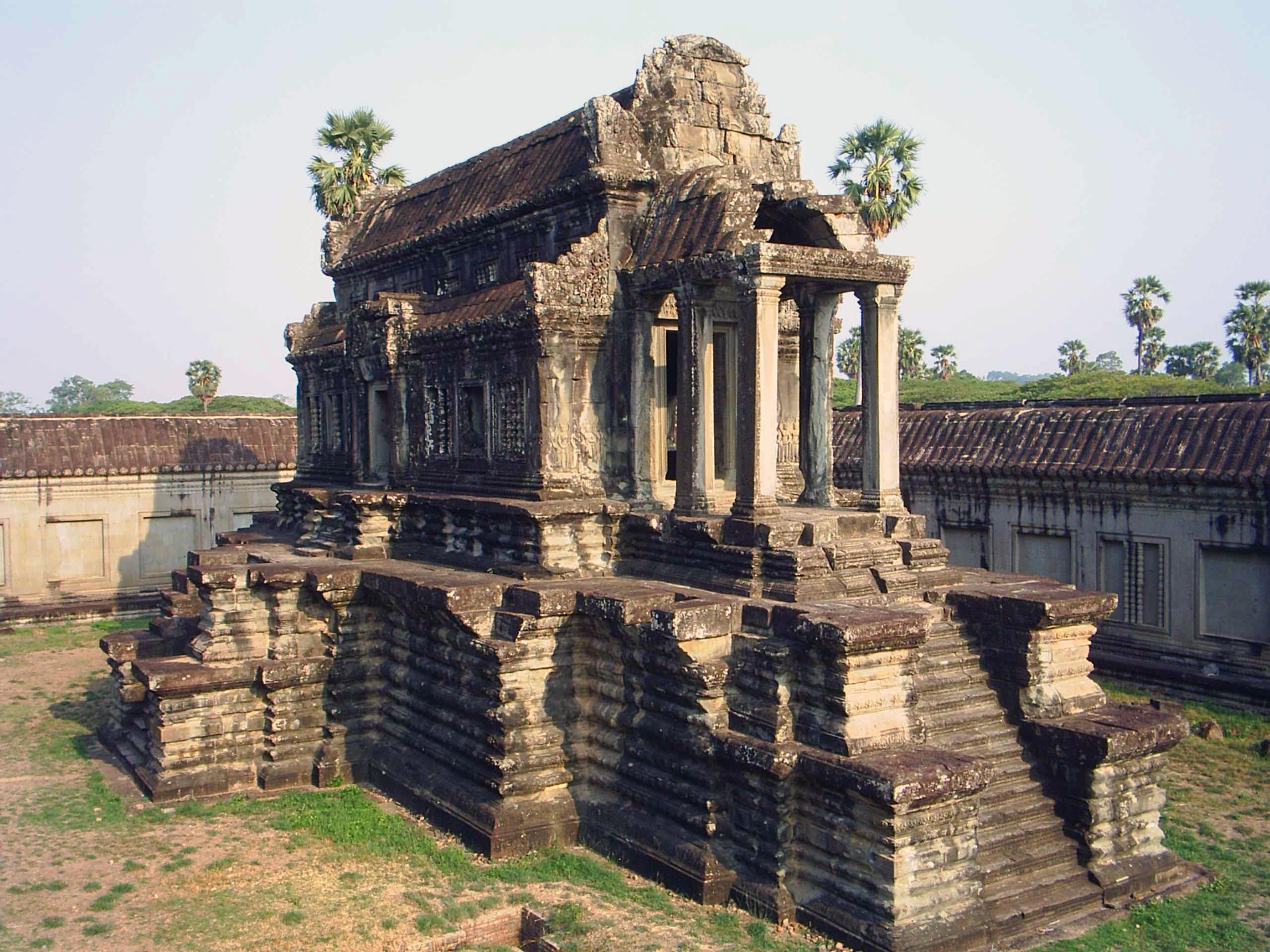
Unusually, the libraries at Angkor Wat open to both the East and the West.

=== Library ===
Structures conventionally known as "libraries" are a common feature of the Khmer temple architecture, but their true purpose remains unknown. Most likely they functioned broadly as religious shrines rather than strictly as repositories of manuscripts. Freestanding buildings, they were normally placed in pairs on either side of the entrance to an enclosure, opening to the west.

=== Srah and baray ===
Srahs and barays were reservoirs, generally created by excavation and embankment, respectively. It is not clear whether the significance of these reservoirs was religious, agricultural, or a combination of the two.

The two largest reservoirs at Angkor were the West Baray and the East Baray located on either side of Angkor Thom. The East Baray is now dry. The West Mebon is an 11th-century temple standing at the center of the West Baray and the East Mebon is a 10th-century temple standing at the center of the East Baray.

The baray associated with Preah Khan is the Jayataka, in the middle of which stands the 12th-century temple of Neak Pean. Scholars have speculated that the Jayataka represents the Himalayan lake of Anavatapta, known for its miraculous healing powers.

=== Temple mountain ===
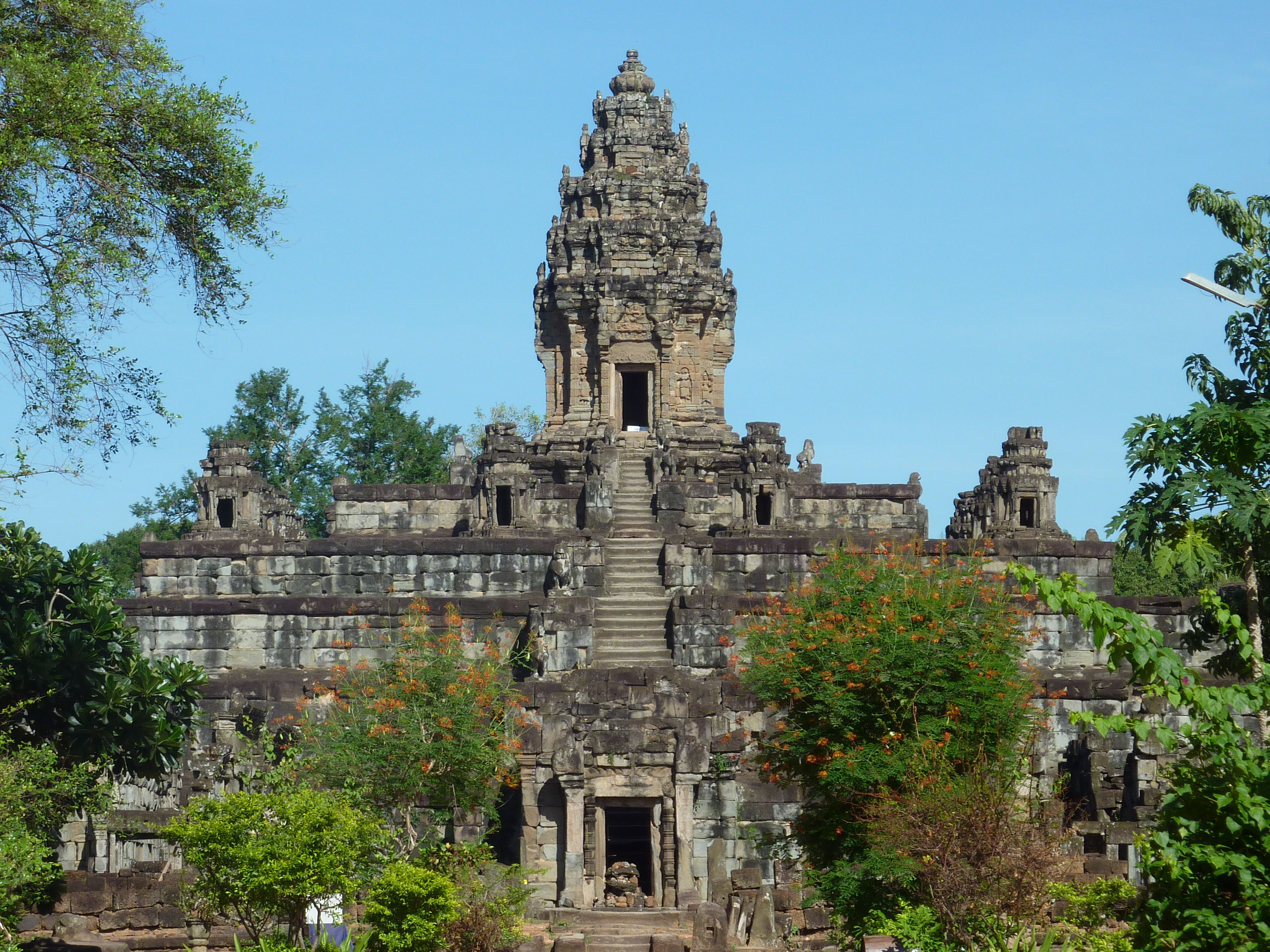
The Bakong is the earliest surviving Temple Mountain at Angkor.

The dominant scheme for the construction of state temples in the Angkorian period was that of the Temple Mountain, an architectural representation of Mount Meru, the home of the gods in Hinduism. Enclosures represented the mountain chains surrounding Mount Meru, while a moat represented the ocean. The temple itself took shape as a pyramid of several levels, and the home of the gods was represented by the elevated sanctuary at the center of the temple.

The first great temple mountain was the Bakong, a five-level pyramid dedicated in 881 by King Indravarman I. The structure of Bakong took shape of stepped pyramid, popularly identified as temple mountain of early Khmer temple architecture. The striking similarity of the Bakong and Borobudur in Java, going into architectural details such as the gateways and stairs to the upper terraces, strongly suggests that Borobudur might have served as the prototype of Bakong. There must have been exchanges of travelers, if not mission, between Khmer kingdom and the Sailendras in Java. Transmitting to Cambodia not only ideas, but also technical and architectural details of Borobudur, including arched gateways in corbelling method.

Other Khmer temple mountains include Baphuon, Pre Rup, Ta Keo, Koh Ker, the Phimeanakas, and most notably the Phnom Bakheng at Angkor.

According to Charles Higham, "A temple was built for the worship of the ruler, whose essence, if a Saivite, was embodied in a linga... housed in the central sanctuary which served as a temple-mausoleum for the ruler after his death...these central temples also contained shrines dedicated to the royal ancestors and thus became centres of ancestor worship".

== Elements ==
=== Bas-relief ===
Bas-reliefs are individual figures, groups of figures, or entire scenes cut into stone walls, not as drawings but as sculpted images projecting from a background. Sculpture in bas-relief is distinguished from sculpture in haut-relief, in that the latter projects farther from the background, in some cases almost detaching itself from it. The Angkorian preferred to work in bas-relief, while their neighbors the Cham were partial to haut-relief.

Narrative bas-reliefs are bas-reliefs depicting stories from mythology or history. Until about the 11th century, the Angkorian Khmer confined their narrative bas-reliefs to the space on the tympana above doorways. The most famous early narrative bas-reliefs are those on the tympana at the 10th-century temple of Banteay Srei, depicting scenes from Hindu mythology as well as scenes from the great works of Indian literature, the Ramayana and the Mahabharata.

By the 12th century, however, the Angkorian artists were covering entire walls with narrative scenes in bas-relief. At Angkor Wat, the external gallery wall is covered with some 12,000 or 13,000 square meters of such scenes, some of them historical, some mythological. Similarly, the outer gallery at the Bayon contains extensive bas-reliefs documenting the everyday life of the medieval Khmer as well as historical events from the reign of King Jayavarman VII.

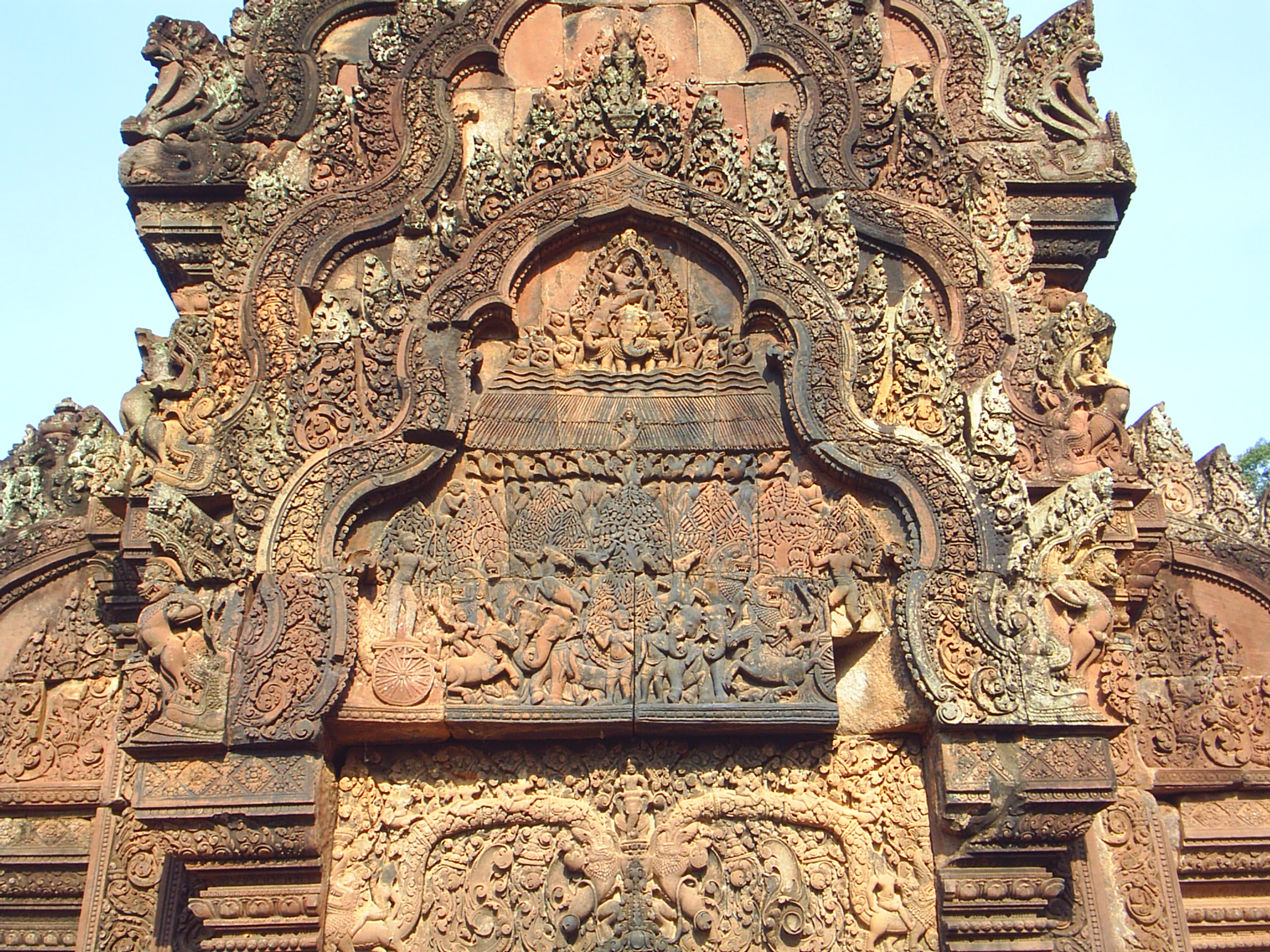
A bas-relief in a tympanum at Banteay Srei shows Indra releasing the rains in an attempt to extinguish the fire created by Agni.

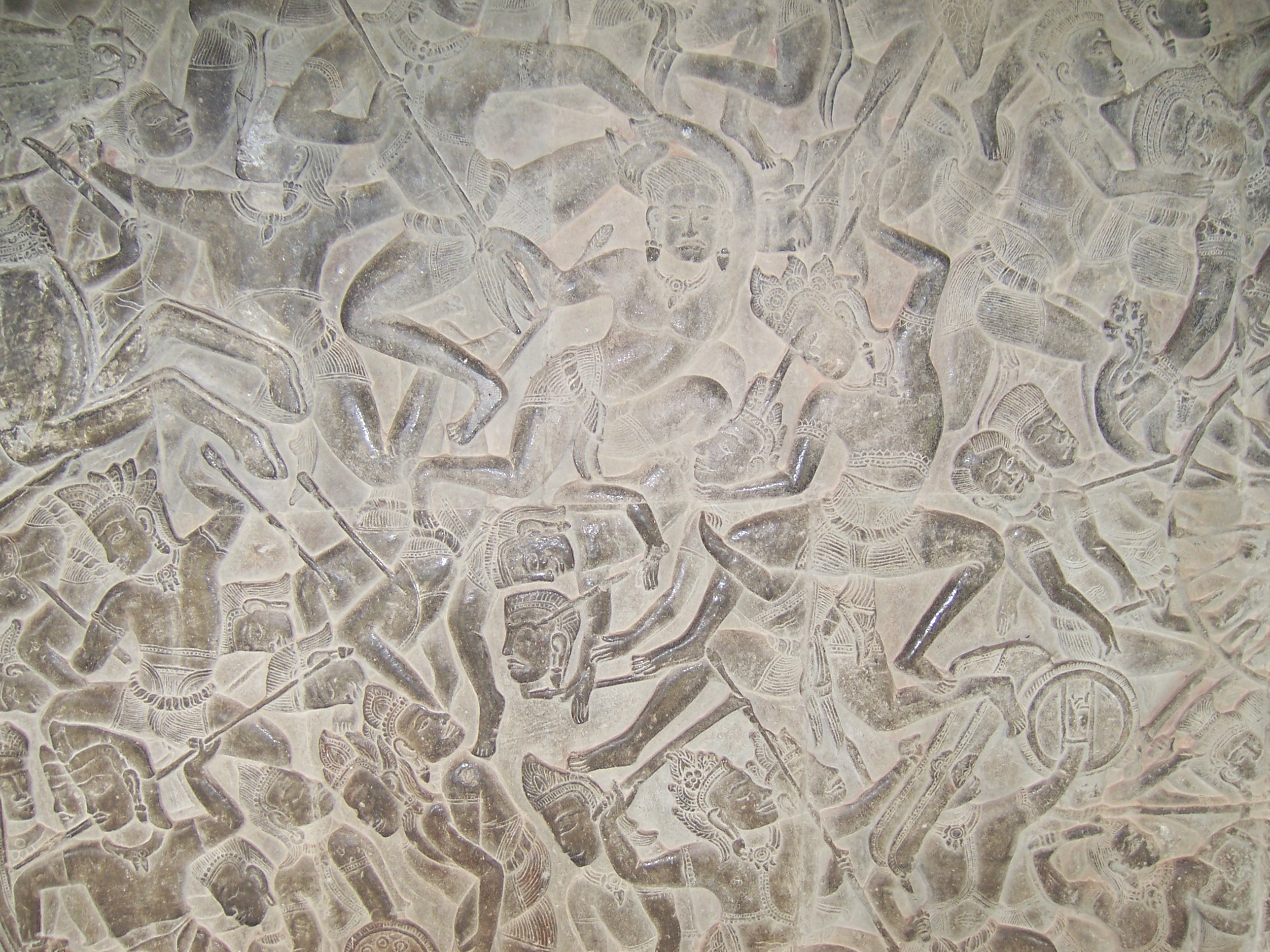
The Battle of Kurukshetra is the subject of this bas-relief at Angkor Wat.

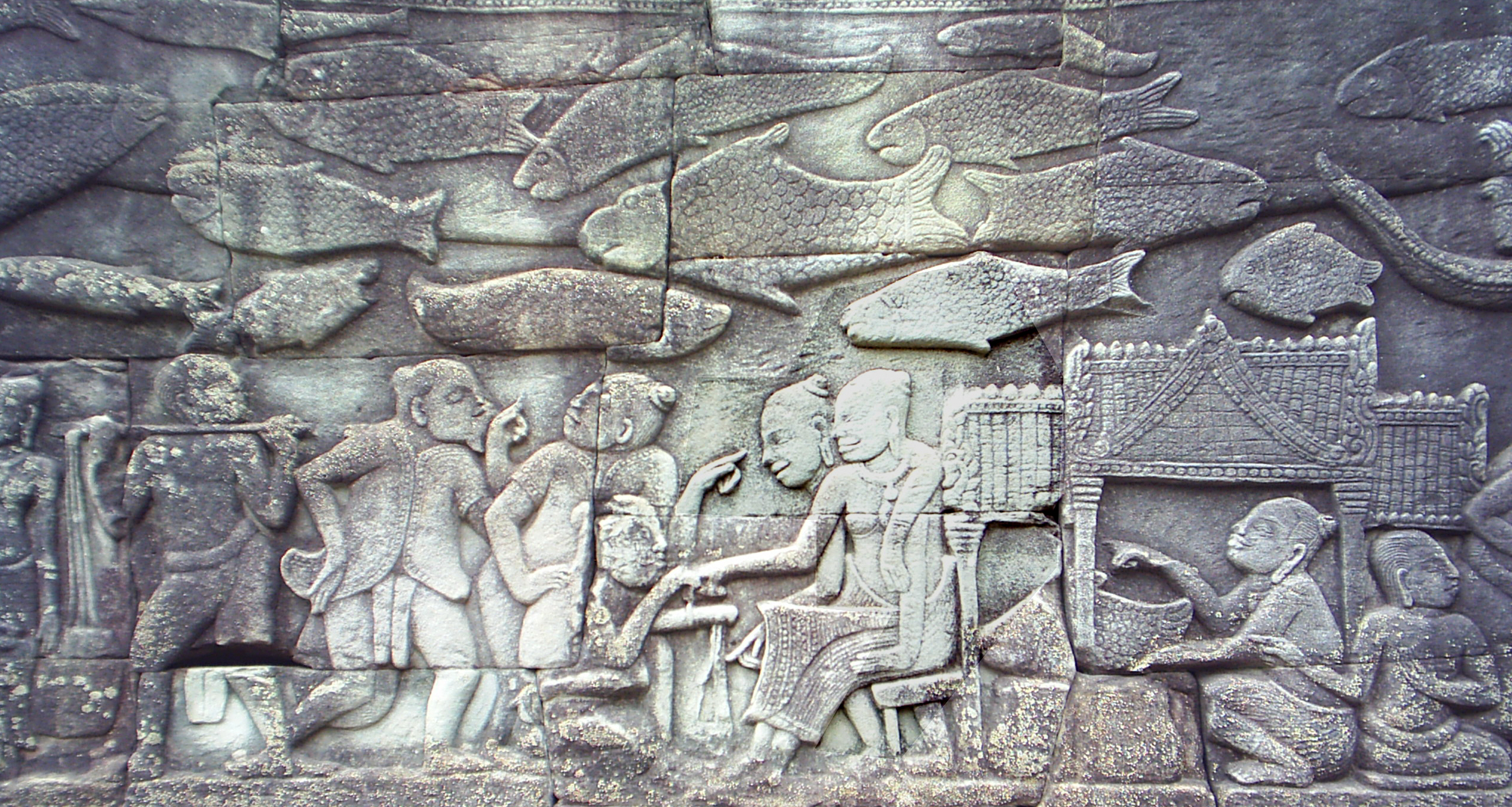
This scene from the outer gallery at the Bayon shows Chinese expats negotiating with Khmer merchants at an Angkorean market.

The following is a listing of the motifs illustrated in some of the more famous Angkorian narrative bas-reliefs:

- bas-reliefs in the tympana at Banteay Srei (10th century)
  - the duel of the monkey princes Vali and Sugriva, and the intervention of the human hero Rama on behalf of the latter
  - the duel of Bhima and Duryodhana at the Battle of Kurukshetra
  - the Rakshasa king Ravana shaking Mount Kailasa, upon which sit Shiva and his shakti
  - Kama firing an arrow at Shiva as the latter sits on Mount Kailasa
  - the burning of Khandava Forest by Agni and Indra's attempt to extinguish the flames
- bas-reliefs on the walls of the outer gallery at Angkor Wat (mid-12th century)
  - the Battle of Lanka between the Rakshasas and the vanaras or monkeys
  - the court and procession of King Suryavarman II, the builder of Angkor Wat
  - the Battle of Kurukshetra between Pandavas and Kauravas
  - the judgment of Yama and the tortures of Hell
  - the Churning of the Ocean of Milk
  - a battle between devas and asuras
  - a battle between Vishnu and a force of asuras
  - the conflict between Krishna and the asura Bana
  - the story of the monkey princes Vali and Sugriva
- bas-reliefs on the walls of the outer and inner galleries at the Bayon (late 12th century)
  - battles on land and sea between Khmer and Cham troops
  - scenes from the everyday life of Angkor
  - civil strife among the Khmer
  - the legend of the Leper King
  - the worship of Shiva
  - groups of dancing apsaras

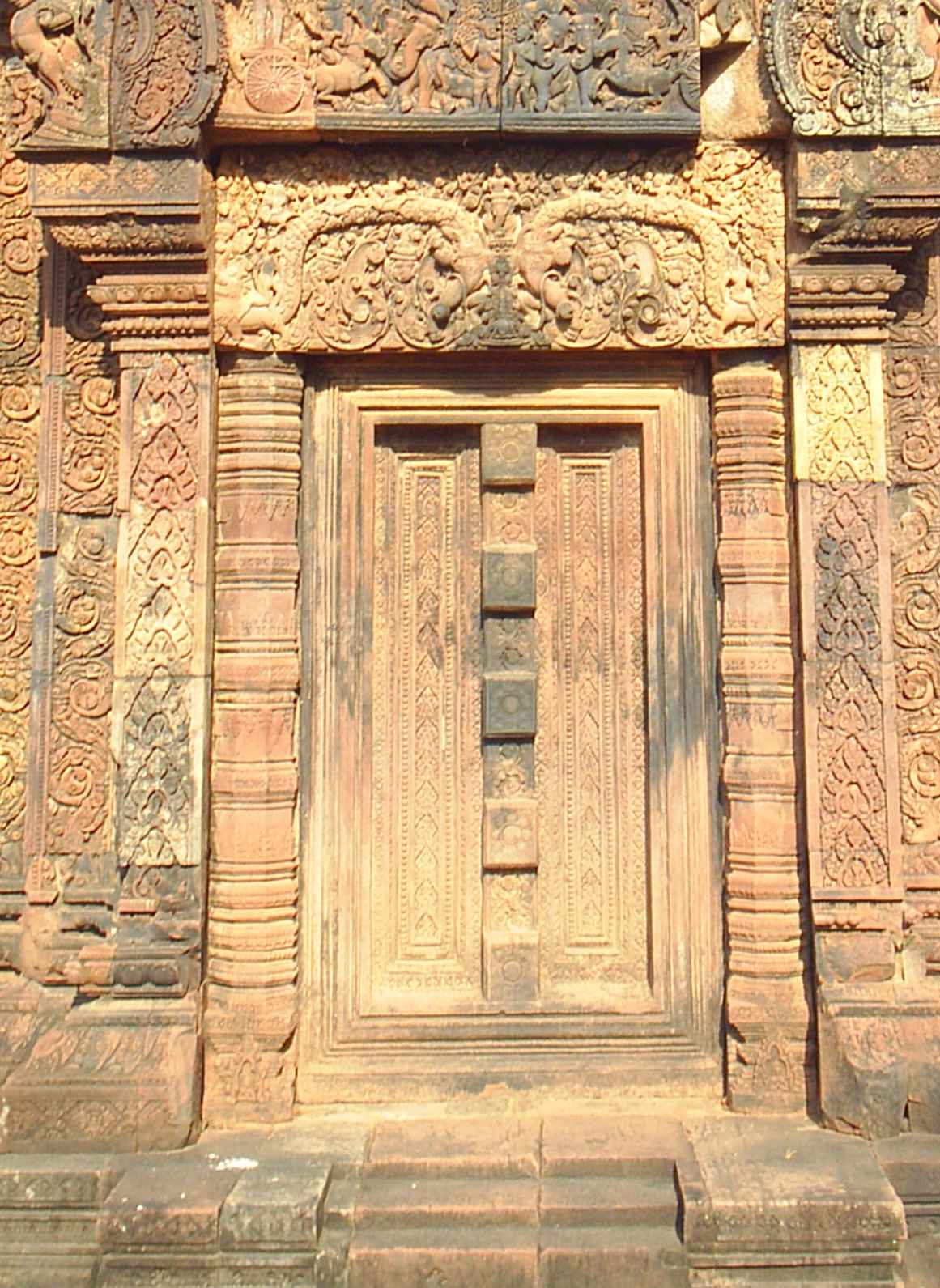
This blind door at Banteay Srei is flanked by colonettes. Above the door is a lintel, above which is a tympanum with a scene from the Mahabharata.

=== Blind door and window ===
Angkorean shrines frequently opened in only one direction, typically to the east. The other three sides featured fake or blind doors to maintain symmetry. Blind windows were often used along otherwise blank walls.

=== Colonnette ===
Colonnettes were narrow decorative columns that served as supports for the beams and lintels above doorways or windows. Depending on the period, they were round, rectangular, or octagonal in shape. Colonnettes were often circled with molded rings and decorated with carved leaves.

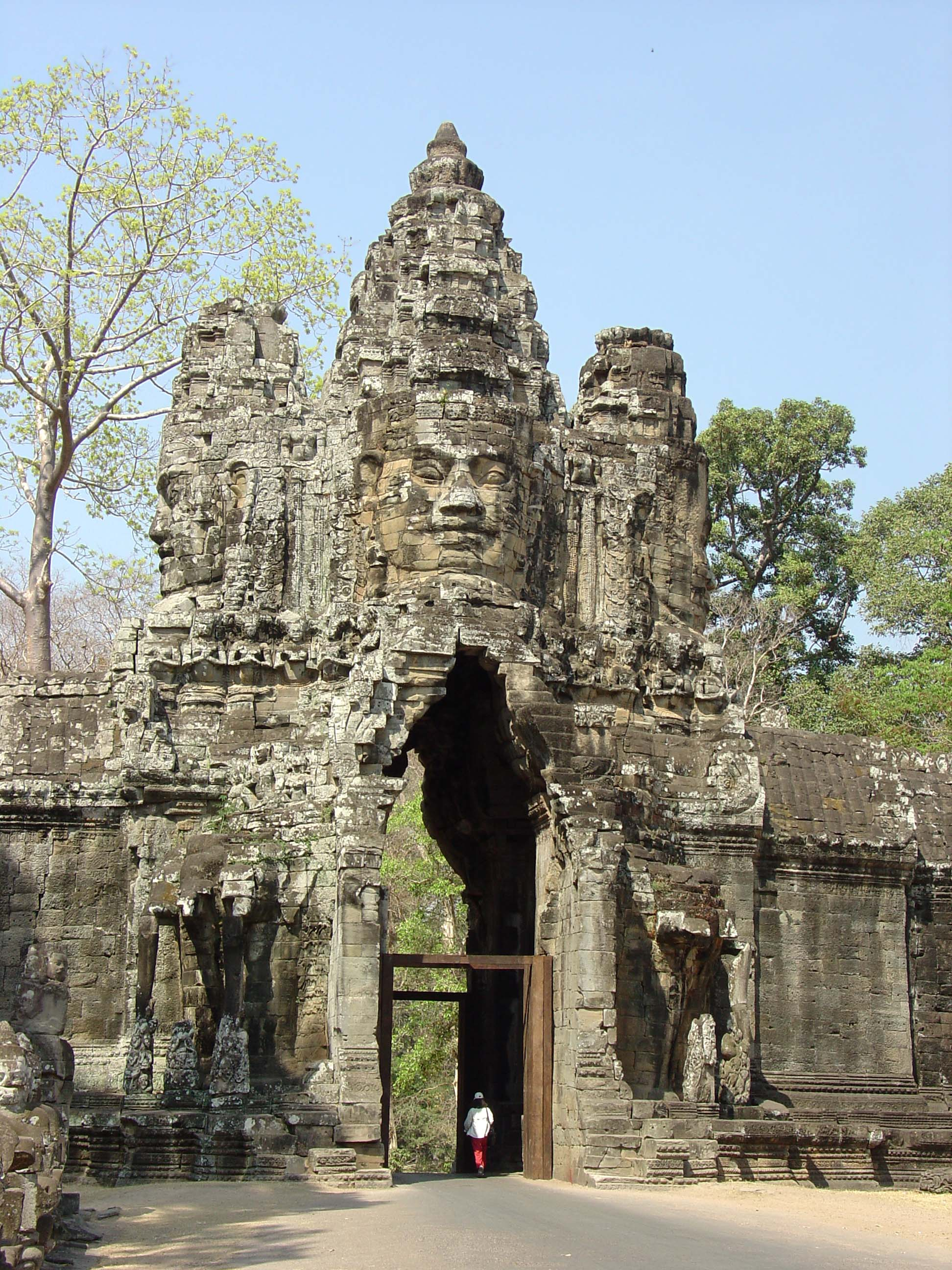
Corbelled arch at the south gate of Angkor Thom

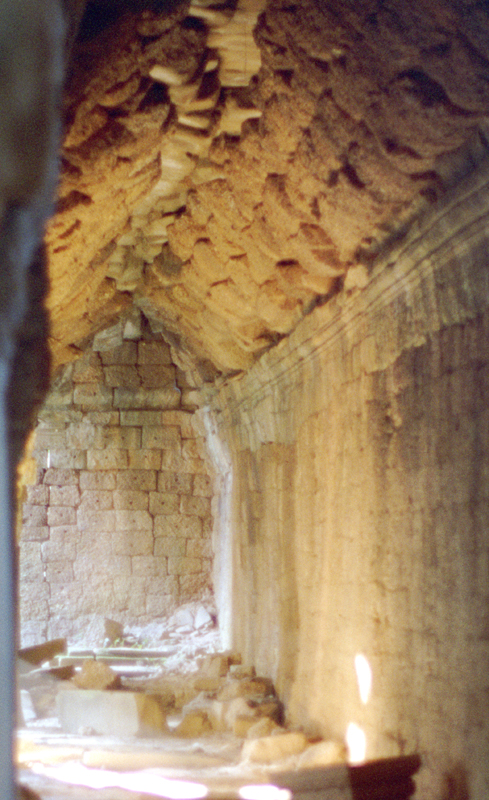
Corbelled hallway at Ta Prohm

=== Corbelling ===
Angkorian engineers tended to use the corbel arch in order to construct rooms, passageways and openings in buildings. A corbel arch is constructed by adding layers of stones to the walls on either side of an opening, with each successive layer projecting further towards the centre than the one supporting it from below, until the two sides meet in the middle. The corbel arch is structurally weaker than the true arch. The use of corbelling prevented the Angkorian engineers from constructing large openings or spaces in buildings roofed with stone, and made such buildings particularly prone to collapse once they were no longer maintained. These difficulties did not, of course, exist for buildings constructed with stone walls surmounted by a light wooden roof. The problem of preventing the collapse of corbelled structures at Angkor remains a serious one for modern conservation.

=== Lintel, pediment, and tympanum ===
A lintel is a horizontal beam connecting two vertical columns between which runs a door or passageway. Because the Angkorean lacked the ability to construct a true arch, they constructed their passageways using lintels or corbelling. A pediment is a roughly triangular structure above a lintel. A tympanum is the decorated surface of a pediment.

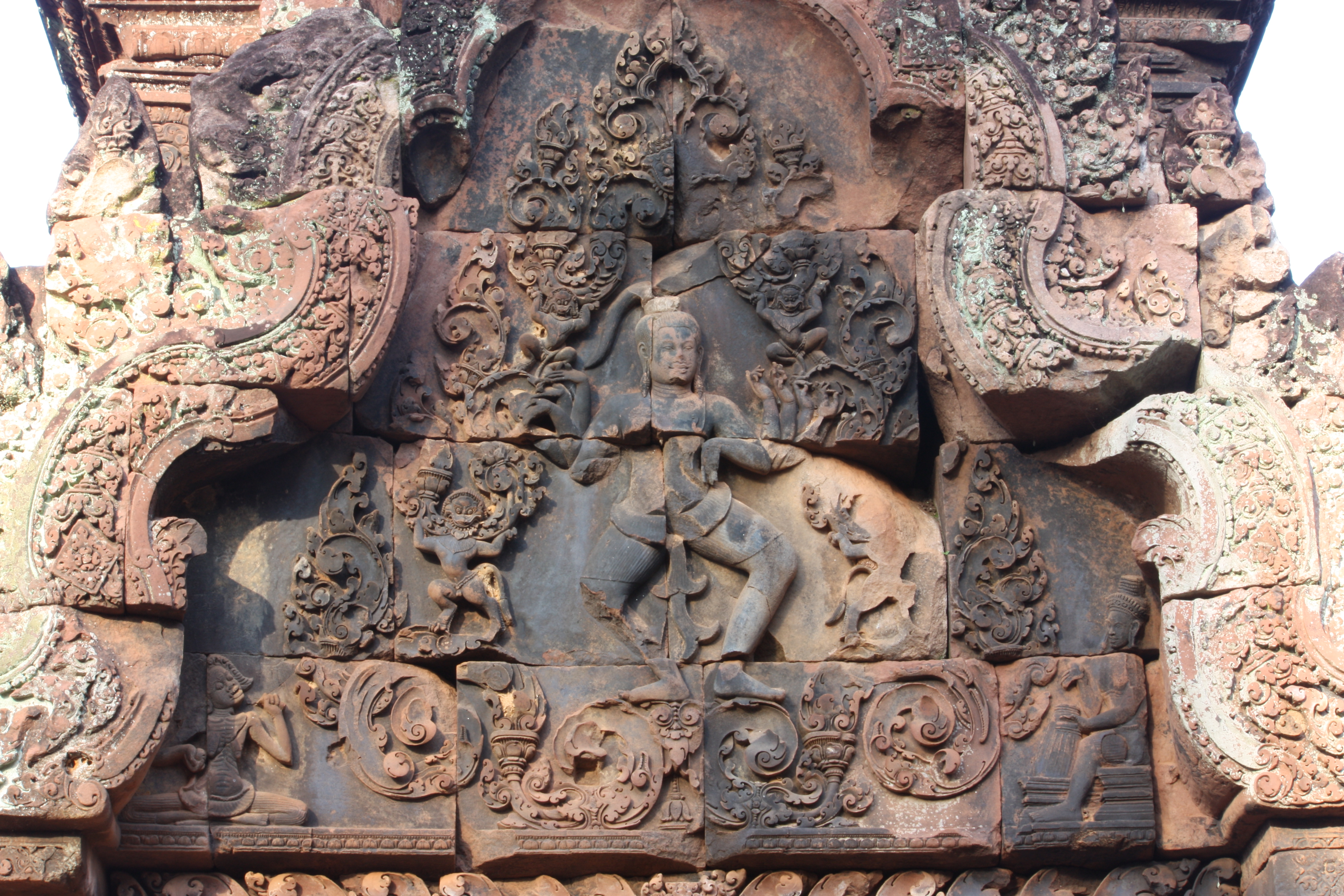
Lintel and pediment at Banteay Srei; the motif on the pediment is Shiva Nataraja.

The styles employed by Angkorean artists in the decoration of lintels evolved over time, as a result, the study of lintels has proven a useful guide to the dating of temples. Some scholars have endeavored to develop a periodization of lintel styles. The most beautiful Angkorean lintels are thought to be those of the Preah Ko style from the late 9th century.

Common motifs in the decoration of lintels include the kala, the nāga and the makara, as well as various forms of vegetation. Also frequently depicted are the Hindu gods associated with the four cardinal directions, with the identity of the god depicted on a given lintel or pediment depending on the direction faced by that element. Indra, the god of the sky, is associated with East; Yama, the god of judgment and Hell, with South; Varuna, the god of the ocean, with West; and Kubera, god of wealth, with North.

==== List of Khmer lintel styles ====
- Sambor Prei Kuk style: inward-facing makaras with tapering bodies. Four arches joined by three medallions, the central once carved with Indra. Small figure on each makara. A variation is with figures replacing the makaras and a scene with figures below the arch.
- Prei Khmeng style: continuation of Sambor Prei Kuk but makaras disappear, being replaced by incurving ends and figures. Arches more rectilinear. Large figures sometimes at each end. A variation is a central scene below the arch, usually Vishnu Reclining.
- Kompong Preah style: high quality carving. Arches replaced by a garland of vegetation (like a wreath) more or less segmented. Medallions disappear, central one sometimes replaced by a knot of leaves. Leafy pendants spray out above and below garland.
- Kulen style: great diversity, with influences from Champa and Java, including the kala and outward-facing makaras.
- Preah Ko style: some of the most beautiful of all Khmer lintels, rich, will-carved and imaginative. Kala in center, issuing garland on either side. Distinct loops of vegetation curl down from garland. Outward-facing makaras sometimes appear at the ends. Vishnu on Garuda common.
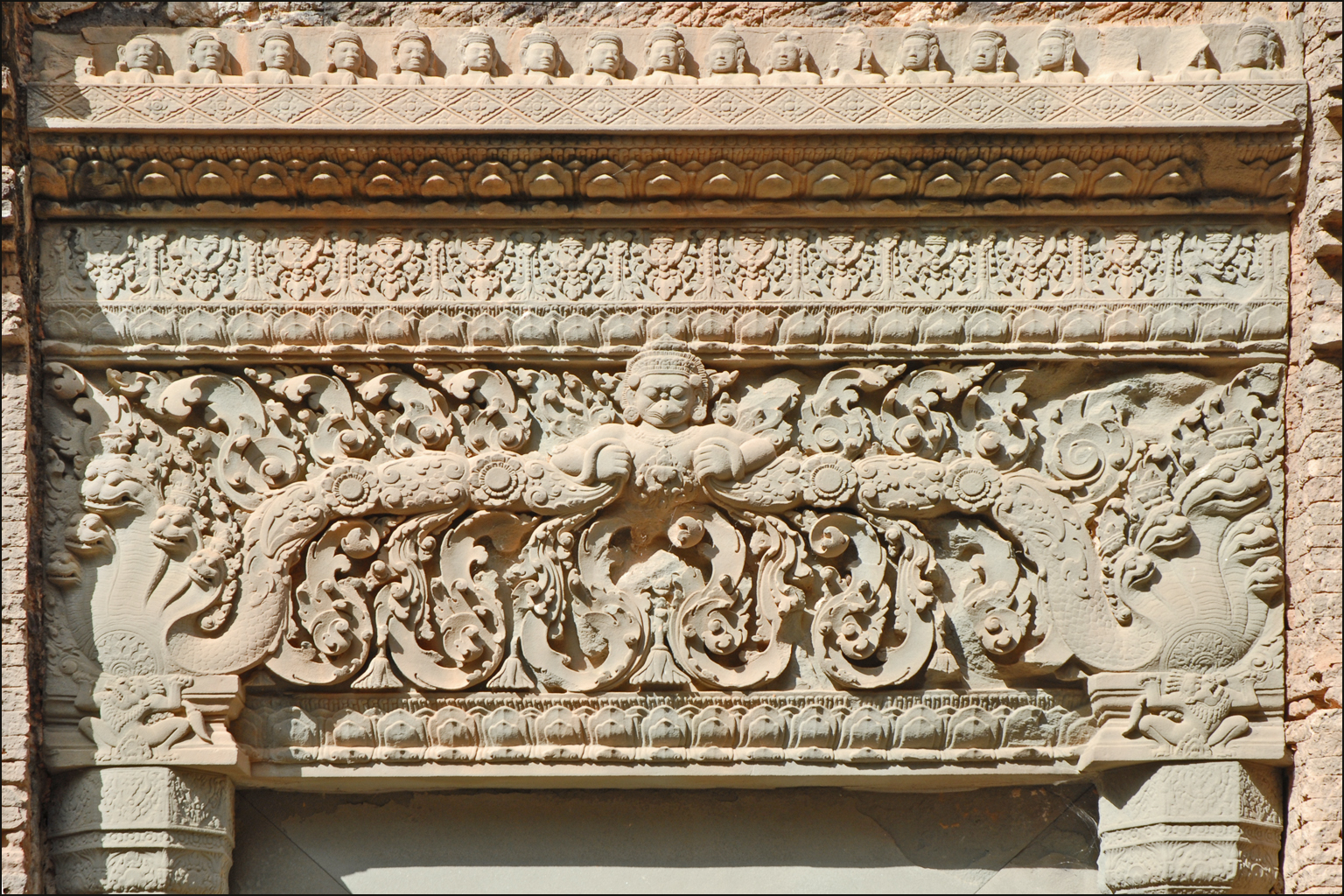
  Rich-carved decoration of Preah Ko lintel
- Bakheng style: continuation of Preah Ko but less fanciful and tiny figures disappear. Loop of vegetation below the naga form tight circular coils. Garland begins to dip in the center.
- Koh Ker style: center occupied by a prominent scene, taking up almost the entire height of the lintel. Usually no lower border. Dress of figures shows a curved line to the sampot tucked in below waist.
- Pre Rup style: tendency to copy earlier style, especially Preah Ko and Bakheng. Central figures. Re-appearance of lower border.
- Banteay Srei style: increase in complexity and detail. Garland sometimes makes pronounced loop on either side with kala at top of each loop. Central figure.
- Khleang style: less ornate than those of Banteay Srei. Central kala with triangular tongue, its hands holding the garland which is bent at the center. Kala sometimes surmounted by a divinity. Loops of garland on either side divided by flora stalk and pendant. Vigorous treatment of vegetation.
- Baphuon style: the central kala surmounted by divinity, usually riding a steed or a Vishnu scene, typically from the life of Krishna. Loops of garland no longer cut. Another type is a scene with many figures and little vegetation.
- Angkor Wat style: centered, framed and linked by garlands. A second type is a narrative scene filled with figures. When nagas appear, they curls are tight and prominent. Dress mirrors that of devatas and apsaras in bas-reliefs. No empty spaces.
- Bayon style: most figures disappear, usually only a kala at the bottom of the lintel surmounted by small figure. Mainly Buddhist motifs. In the middle of the period the garland is cut into four parts, while later a series of whorls of foliage replace the four divisions.

=== Stairs ===
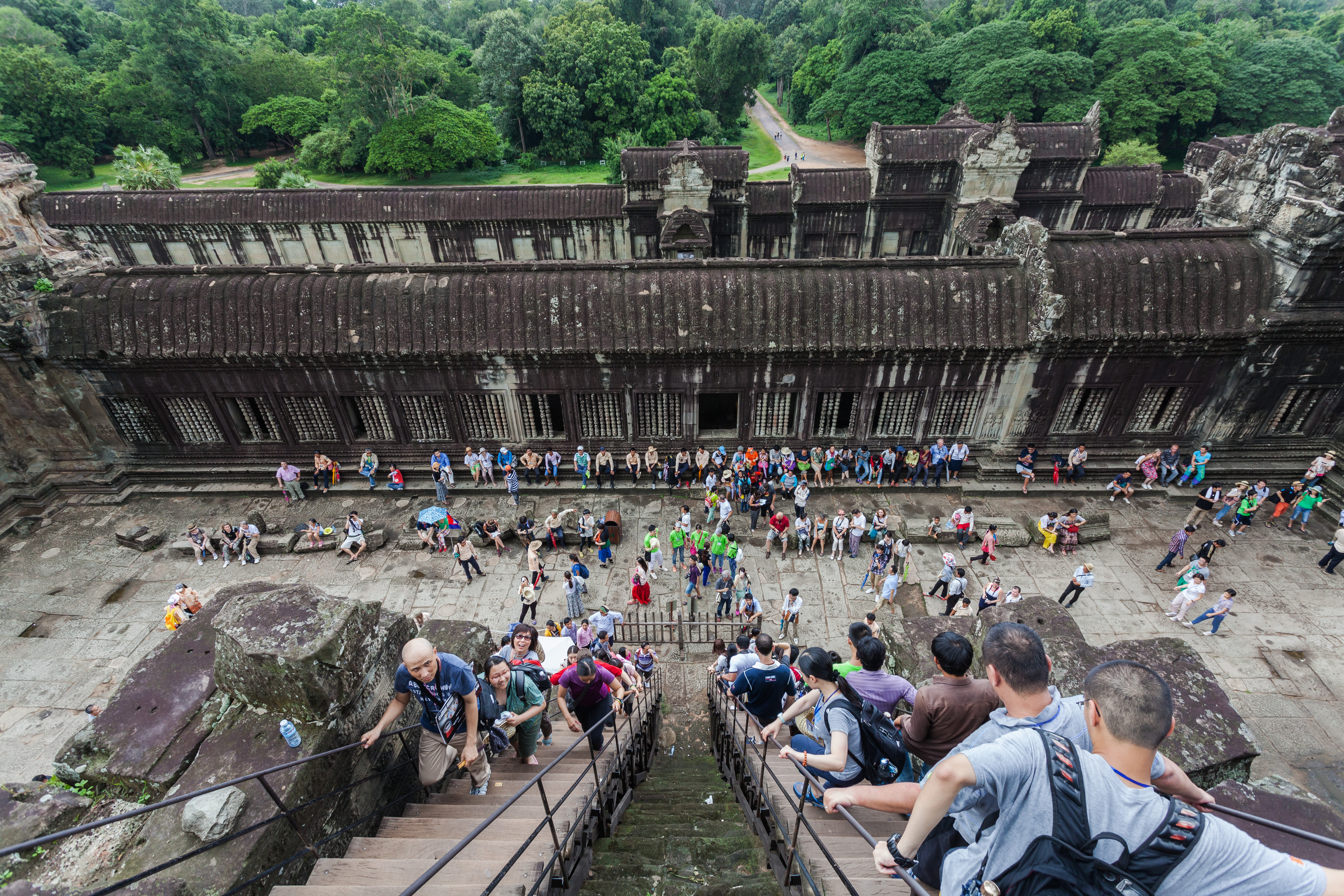
The stairs leading to the inner enclosure at Ankor Wat are daunting.

Angkorean stairs are notoriously steep. Frequently, the length of the riser exceeds that of the tread, producing an angle of ascent somewhere between 45 and 70 degrees. The reasons for this peculiarity appear to be both religious and monumental. From the religious perspective, a steep stairway can be interpreted as a "stairway to heaven", the realm of the gods. "From the monumental point of view", according to Angkor-scholar Maurice Glaize, "the advantage is clear – the square of the base not having to spread in surface area, the entire building rises to its zenith with a particular thrust".

== Motifs ==
=== Apsara and devata ===
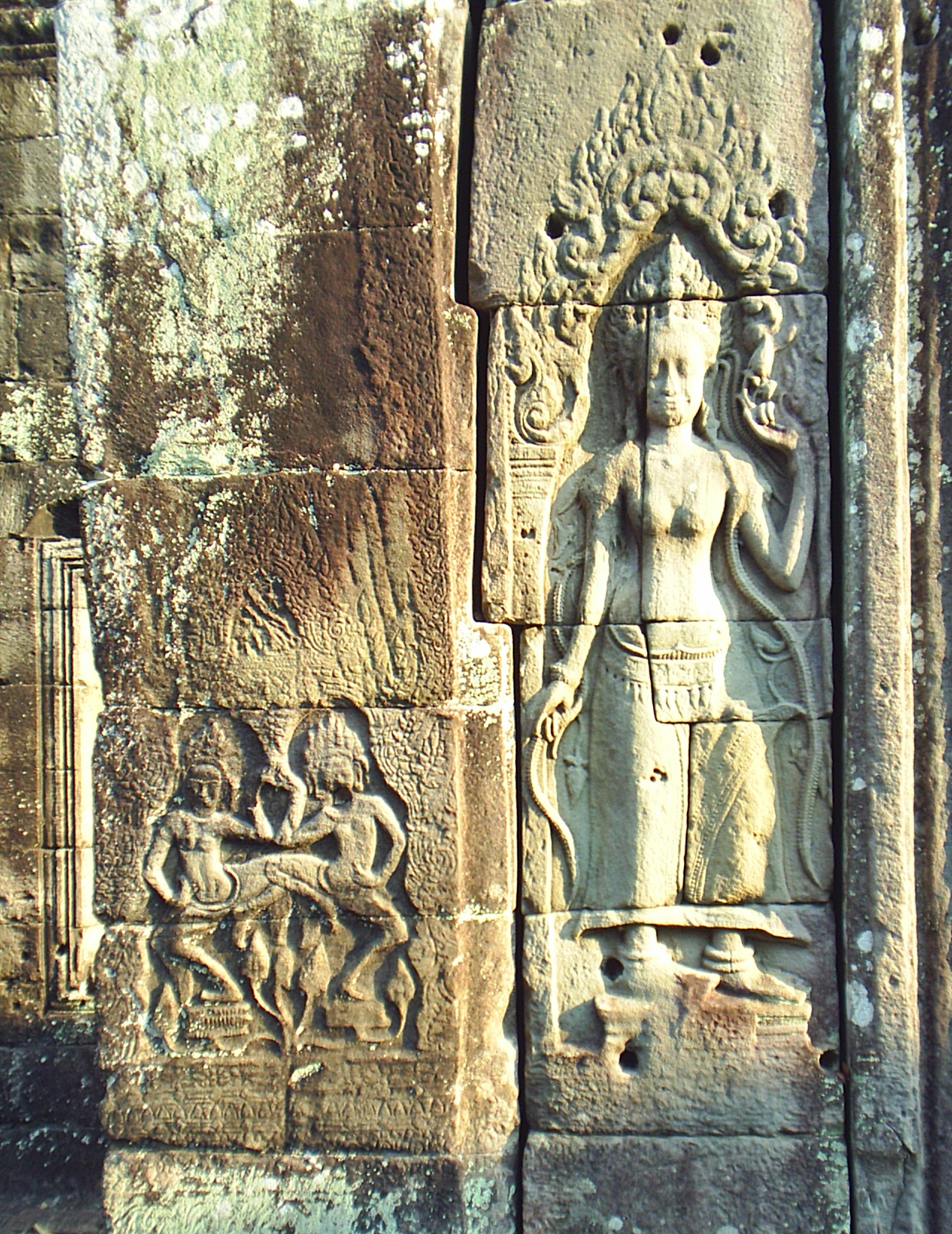
Apsaras (left) and a devata (right) grace the walls at Banteay Kdei.

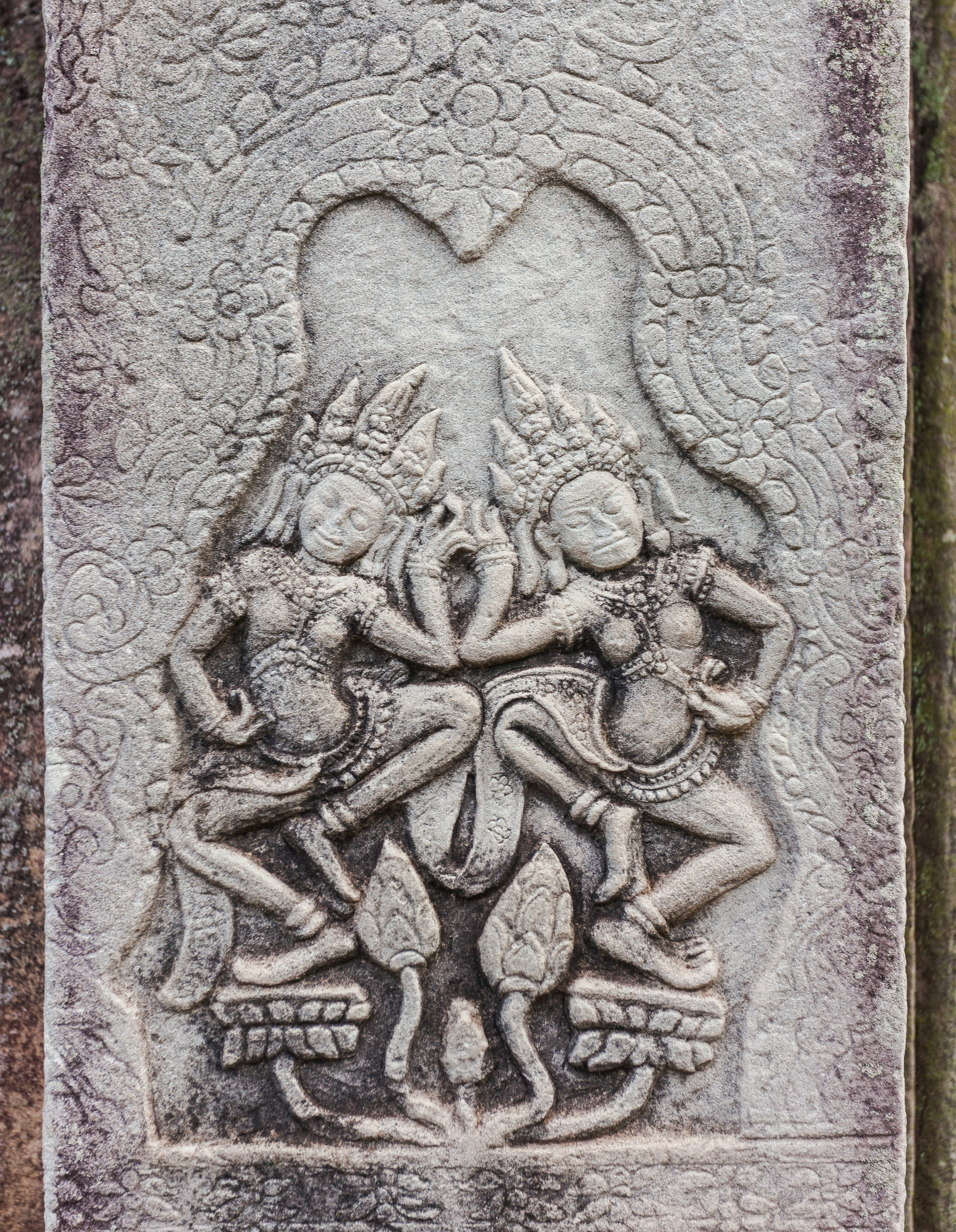
Two apsaras appear on this pillar at the 12th-century Buddhist temple the Bayon.

Apsaras, divine nymphs or celestial dancing girls, are characters from Indian mythology. Their origin is explained in the story of the churning of the Ocean of Milk, or samudra manthan, found in the Vishnu Purana. Other stories in the Mahabharata detail the exploits of individual apsaras, who were often used by the gods as agents to persuade or seduce mythological demons, heroes and ascetics. The widespread use of apsaras as a motif for decorating the walls and pillars of temples and other religious buildings, however, was a Khmer innovation. In modern descriptions of Angkorian temples, the term "apsara" is sometimes used to refer not only to dancers but also to other minor female deities, though minor female deities who are depicted standing rather than dancing are more commonly called "devatas".

Apsaras and devatas are ubiquitous at Angkor, but are most common in the foundations of the 12th century. Depictions of true (dancing) apsaras are found, for example, in the Hall of Dancers at Preah Khan, in the pillars that line the passageways through the outer gallery of the Bayon, and in the famous bas-relief of Angkor Wat depicting the churning of the Ocean of Milk. The largest population of devatas (around 2,000) is at Angkor Wat, where they appear individually and in groups.

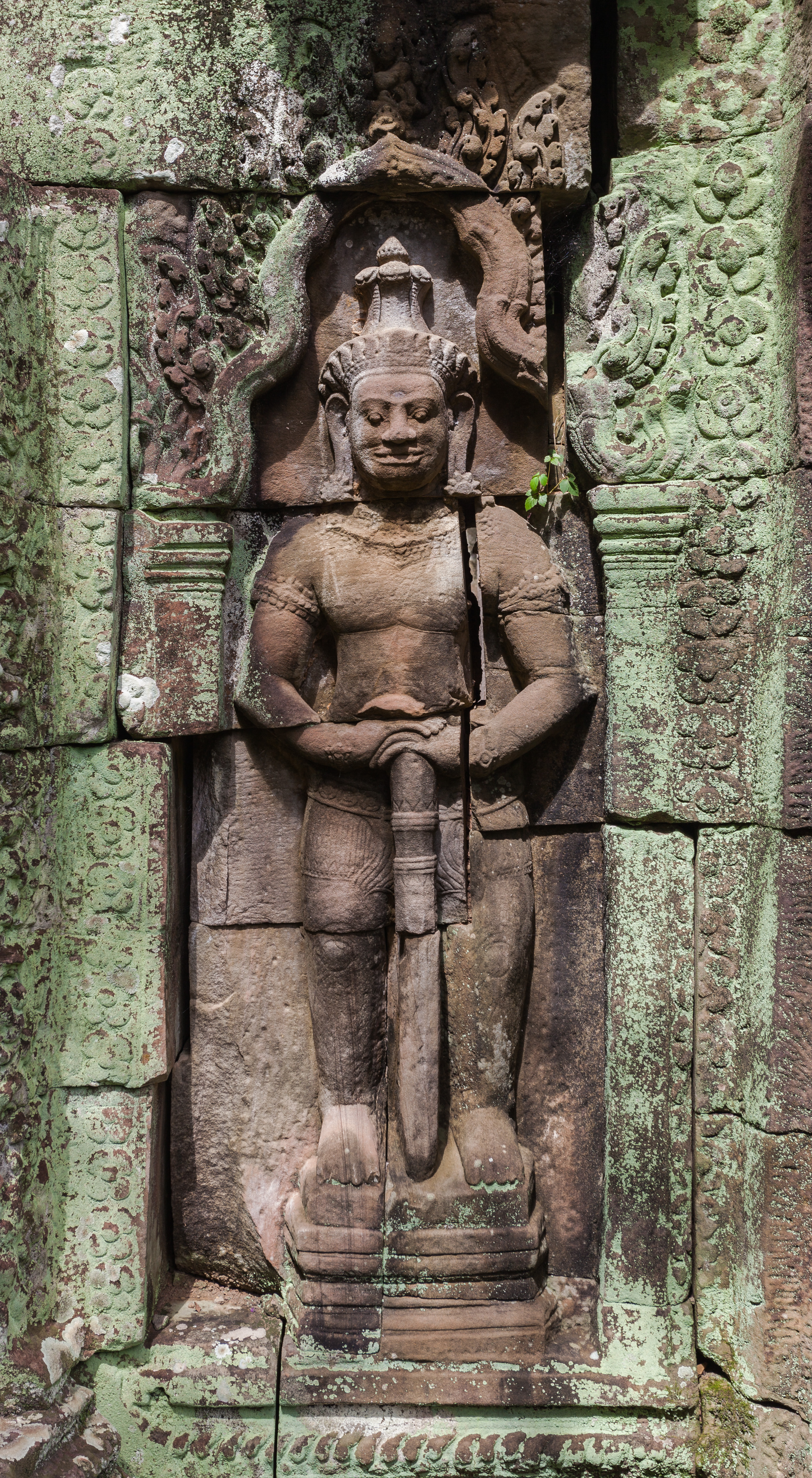
This dvarapala stands guard at Banteay Kdei.

=== Dvarapala ===
Dvarapalas are human or demonic temple guardians, generally armed with lances and clubs. They are presented either as a stone statues or as relief carvings in the walls of temples and other buildings, generally close to entrances or passageways. Their function is to protect the temples. Dvarapalas may be seen, for example, at Preah Ko, Lolei, Banteay Srei, Preah Khan and Banteay Kdei.

=== Gajasimha and Reachisey ===
The gajasimha is a mythical animal with the body of a lion and the head of an elephant. At Angkor, it is portrayed as a guardian of temples and as a mount for some warriors. The gajasimha may be found at Banteay Srei and at the temples belonging to the Roluos group.

The reachisey is another mythical animal, similar to the gajasimha, with the head of a lion, a short elephantine trunk, and the scaly body of a dragon. It occurs at Angkor Wat in the epic bas reliefs of the outer gallery.

=== Garuda ===
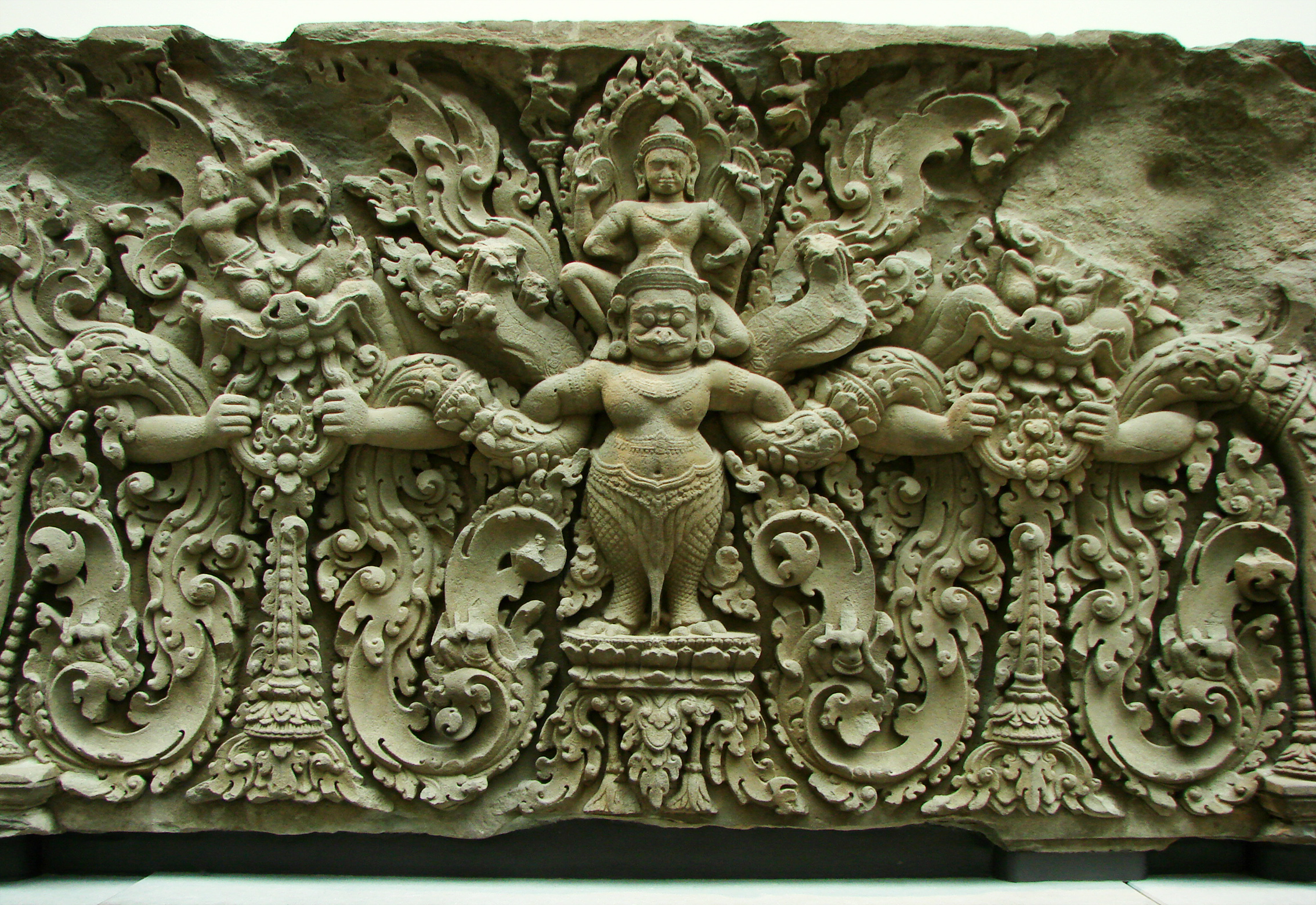
In this 9th century lintel, now on display at the Musée Guimet, Garuda bears Vishnu on his shoulders.

Garuda is a divine being that is part man and part bird. He is the lord of birds, the mythological enemy of nāgas, and the battle steed of Vishnu. Depictions of Garuda at Angkor number in the thousands, and though Indian in inspiration exhibit a style that is uniquely Khmer. They may be classified as follows:

- As part of a narrative bas relief, Garuda is shown as the battle steed of Vishnu or Krishna, bearing the god on his shoulders, and simultaneously fighting against the god's enemies. Numerous such images of Garuda may be observed in the outer gallery of Angkor Wat.
- Garuda serves as an atlas supporting a superstructure, as in the bas relief at Angkor Wat that depicts heaven and hell. Garudas and stylized mythological lions are the most common atlas figures at Angkor.
- Garuda is depicted in the pose of a victor, often dominating a nāga, as in the gigantic relief sculptures on the outer wall of Preah Khan. In this context, Garuda symbolizes the military power of the Khmer kings and their victories over their enemies. Not coincidentally, the city of Preah Khan was built on the site of King Jayavarman VII's victory over invaders from Champa.
- In free-standing nāga sculptures, such as in nāga bridges and balustrades, Garuda is often depicted in relief against the fan of nāga heads. The relationship between Garuda and the nāga heads is ambiguous in these sculptures: it may be one of cooperation, or it may again be one of domination of the nāga by Garuda.

=== Indra ===
In the ancient religion of the Vedas, Indra the sky-god reigned supreme. In the medieval Hinduism of Angkor, however, he had no religious status, and served only as a decorative motif in architecture. Indra is associated with the East; since Angkorian temples typically open to the East, his image is sometimes encountered on lintels and pediments facing that direction. Typically, he is mounted on the three-headed elephant Airavata and holds his trusty weapon, the thunderbolt or vajra. The numerous adventures of Indra documented in Hindu epic Mahabharata are not depicted at Angkor.

=== Kala ===
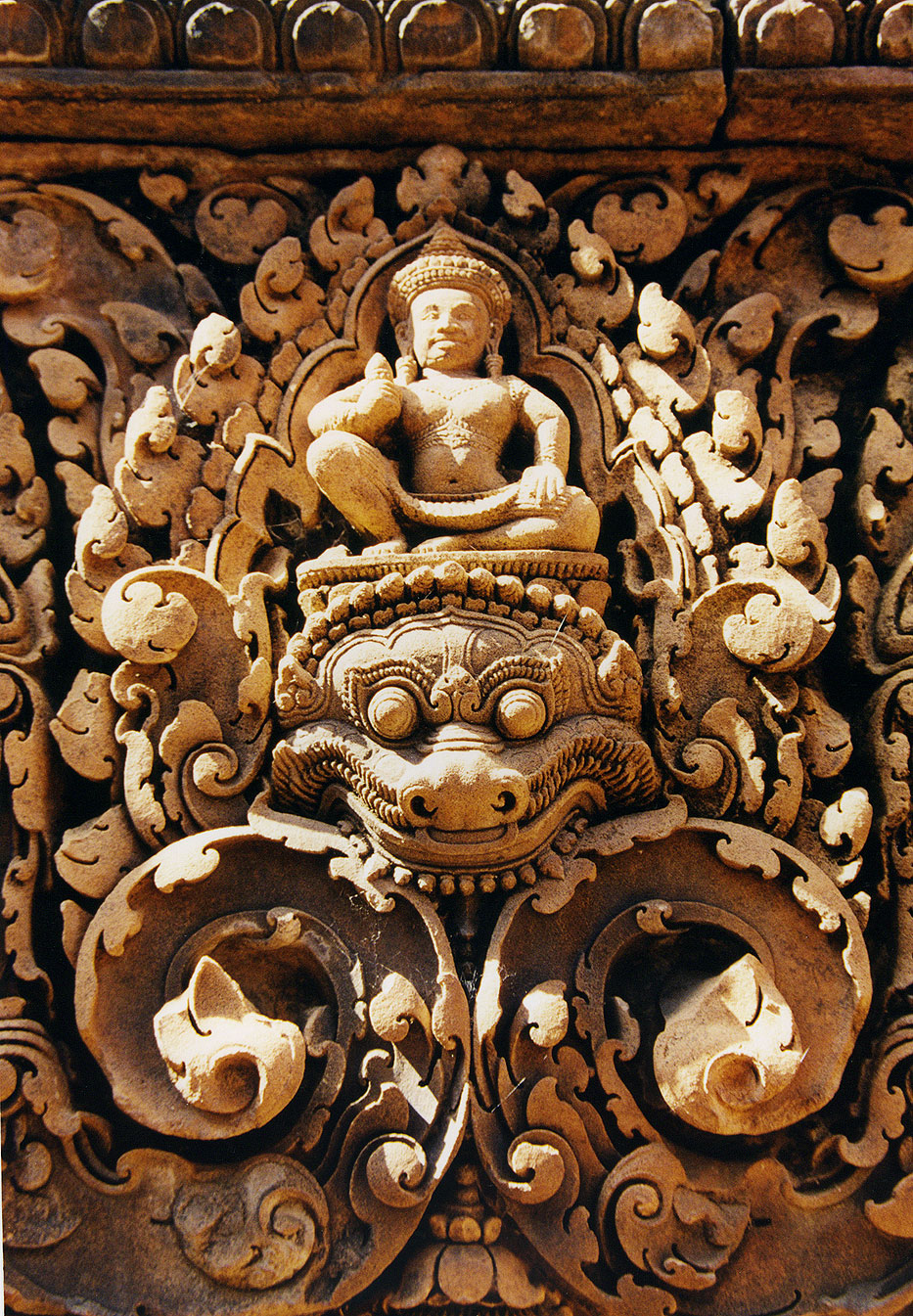
A kala serves as the base for a deity at the 10th-century Hindu temple Banteay Srei.

The kala is a ferocious monster symbolic of time in its all-devouring aspect and associated with the destructive side of the god Siva. In Khmer temple architecture, the kala serves as a common decorative element on lintels, tympana and walls, where it is depicted as a monstrous head with a large upper jaw lined by large carnivorous teeth, but with no lower jaw. Some kalas are shown disgorging vine-like plants, and some serve as the base for other figures.

Scholars have speculated that the origin of the kala as a decorative element in Khmer temple architecture may be found in an earlier period when the skulls of human victims were incorporated into buildings as a kind of protective magic or apotropaism. Such skulls tended to lose their lower jaws when the ligaments holding them together dried out. Thus, the kalas of Angkor may represent the Khmer civilization's adoption into its decorative iconography of elements derived from long forgotten primitive antecedents.

=== Krishna ===
Scenes from the life of Krishna are common in the relief carvings decorating Angkorian temples, and unknown in Angkorian sculpture in the round. The literary sources for these scenes are the Mahabharata, the Harivamsa, and the Bhagavata Purana. The following are some of the most important Angkorian depictions of the life of Krishna:

- A series of bas reliefs at the 11th-century temple pyramid called Baphuon depicts scenes of the birth and childhood of Krishna.
- Numerous bas reliefs in various temples show Krishna subduing the nāga Kaliya. In Angkorian depictions, Krishna is shown effortlessly stepping on and pushing down his opponent's multiple heads.
- Also common is the depiction of Krishna as he lifts Mount Govardhana with one hand in order to provide the cowherds with shelter from the deluge caused by Indra.
- Krishna is frequently depicted killing or subduing various demons, including his evil uncle Kamsa. An extensive bas relief in the outer gallery of Angkor Wat depicts Krishna's battle with the asura Bana. In battle, Krishna is shown riding on the shoulders of Garuda, the traditional mount of Vishnu.
- In some scenes, Krishna is depicted in his role as charioteer, advisor and protector of Arjuna, the hero of the Mahabharata. A well-known bas relief from the 10th-century temple of Banteay Srei depicts the Krishna and Arjuna helping Agni to burn down Khandava forest.

=== Linga ===
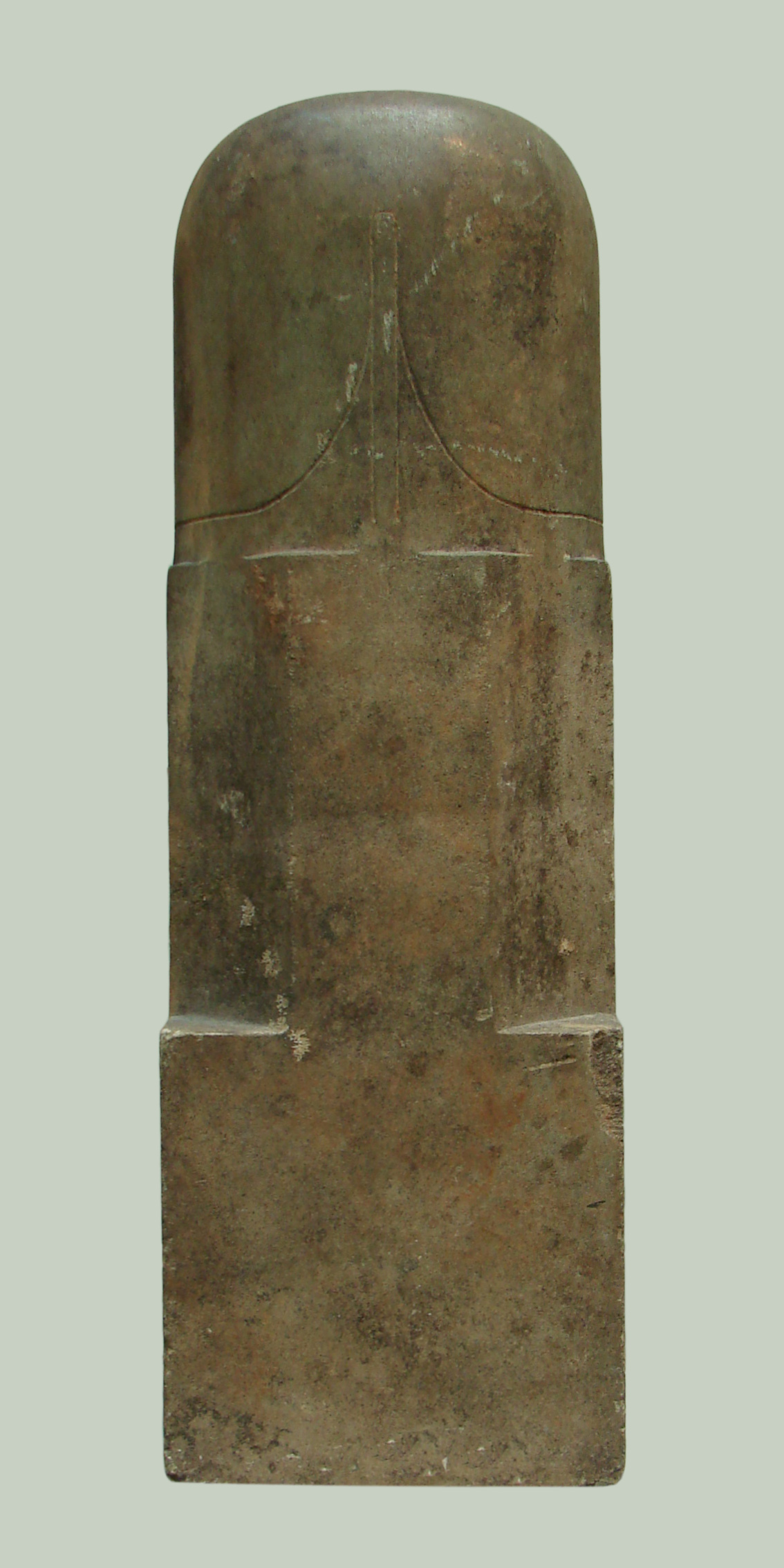
This segmented linga from 10th century Angkor has a square base, an octagonal middle, and a round tip.

The linga is a phallic post or cylinder symbolic of the god Shiva and of creative power. As a religious symbol, the function of the linga is primarily that of worship and ritual, and only secondarily that of decoration. In the Khmer empire, certain lingas were erected as symbols of the king himself, and were housed in royal temples in order to express the king's consubstantiality with Siva. The lingas that survive from the Angkorean period are generally made of polished stone.

The lingas of the Angkorian period are of several different types.

- Some lingas are implanted in a flat square base called a yoni, symbolic of the womb.
- On the surface of some lingas is engraved the face of Siva. Such lingas are called mukhalingas.
- Some lingas are segmented into three parts: a square base symbolic of Brahma, an octagonal middle section symbolic of Vishnu, and a round tip symbolic of Shiva.

=== Makara ===
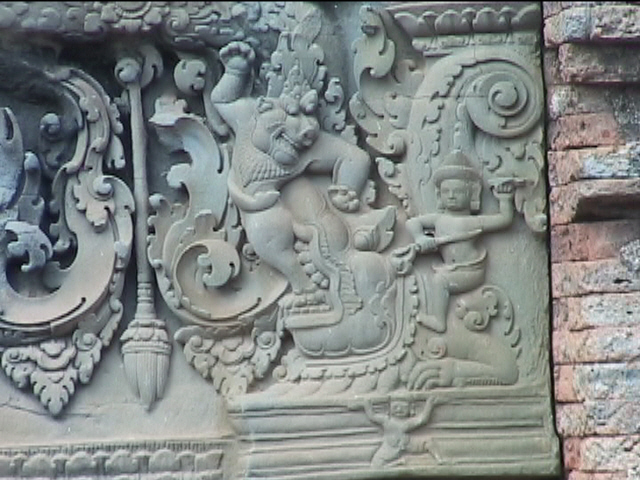
The corner of a lintel on one of the brick towers at Bakong shows a man riding on the back of a makara that in turn disgorges another monster.

A makara is a mythical sea monster with the body of a serpent, the trunk of an elephant, and a head that can have features reminiscent of a lion, a crocodile, or a dragon. In Khmer temple architecture, the motif of the makara is generally part of a decorative carving on a lintel, tympanum, or wall. Often the makara is depicted with some other creature, such as a lion or serpent, emerging from its gaping maw. The makara is a central motif in the design of the famously beautiful lintels of the Roluos group of temples: Preah Ko, Bakong, and Lolei. At Banteay Srei, carvings of makaras disgorging other monsters may be observed on many of the corners of the buildings.

=== Nāga ===
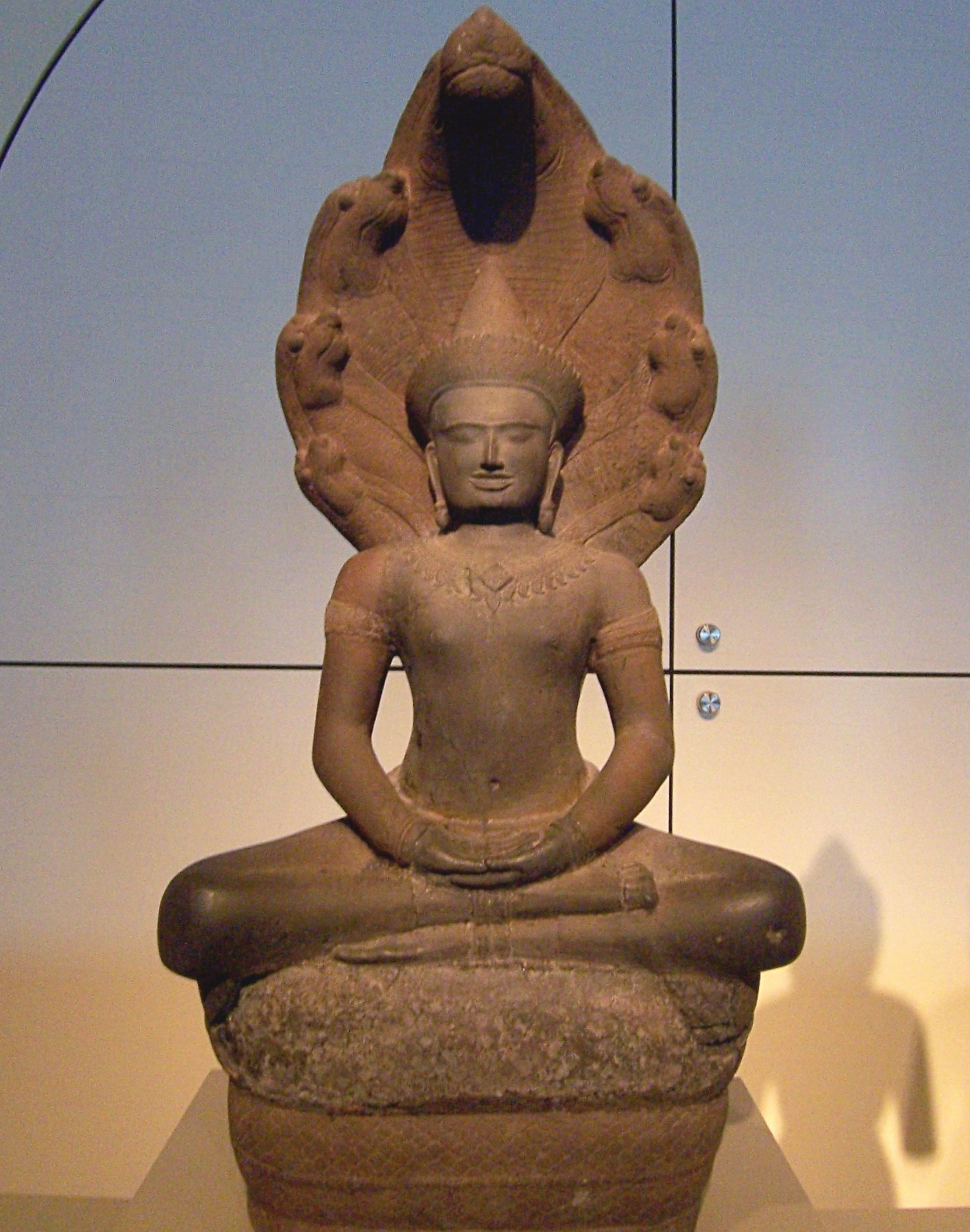
Mucalinda, the nāga king who shielded Buddha as he sat in meditation, was a favorite motif for Cambodian Buddhist sculptors from the 11th century. This statue is dated between 1150 and 1175 CE.

Mythical serpents, or nāgas, represent an important motif in Khmer architecture as well as in free-standing sculpture. They are frequently depicted as having multiple heads, always uneven in number, arranged in a fan. Each head has a flared hood, in the manner of a cobra.

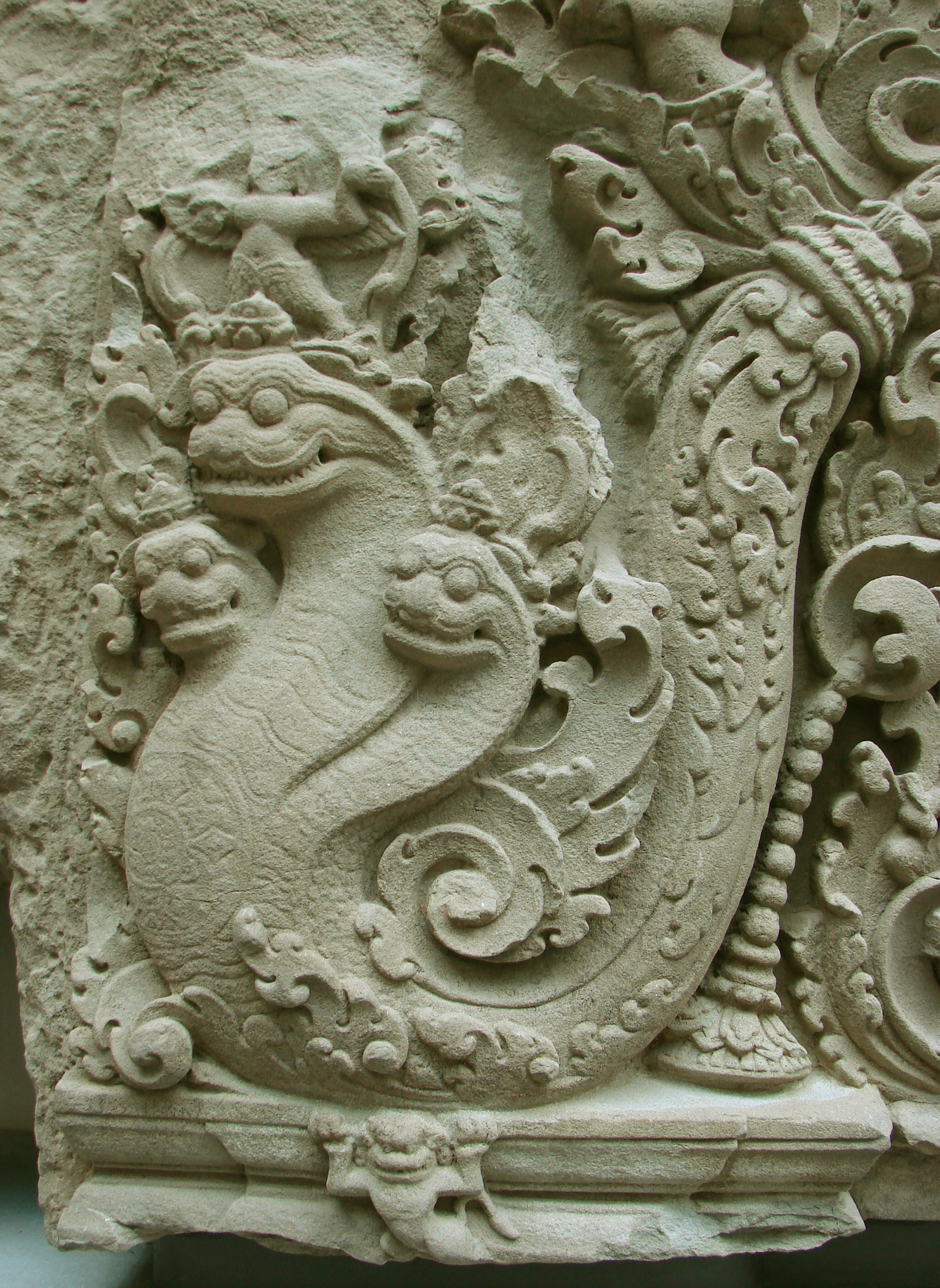
This multi-headed nāga is part of a decorative lintel from the end of the 9th century.

Nāgas are frequently depicted in Angkorian lintels. The composition of such lintels characteristically consists in a dominant image at the center of a rectangle, from which issue swirling elements that reach to the far ends of the rectangle. These swirling elements may take shape as either vinelike vegetation or as the bodies of nāgas. Some such nāgas are depicted wearing crowns, and others are depicted serving as mounts for human riders.

To the Angkorian, nāgas were symbols of water and figured in the myths of origin for the Khmer people, who were said to be descended from the union of an Indian Brahman and a serpent princess from Cambodia. Nāgas were also characters in other well-known legends and stories depicted in Khmer art, such as the churning of the Ocean of Milk, the legend of the Leper King as depicted in the bas-reliefs of the Bayon, and the story of Mucalinda, the serpent king who protected the Buddha from the elements.

=== Nāga Bridge ===
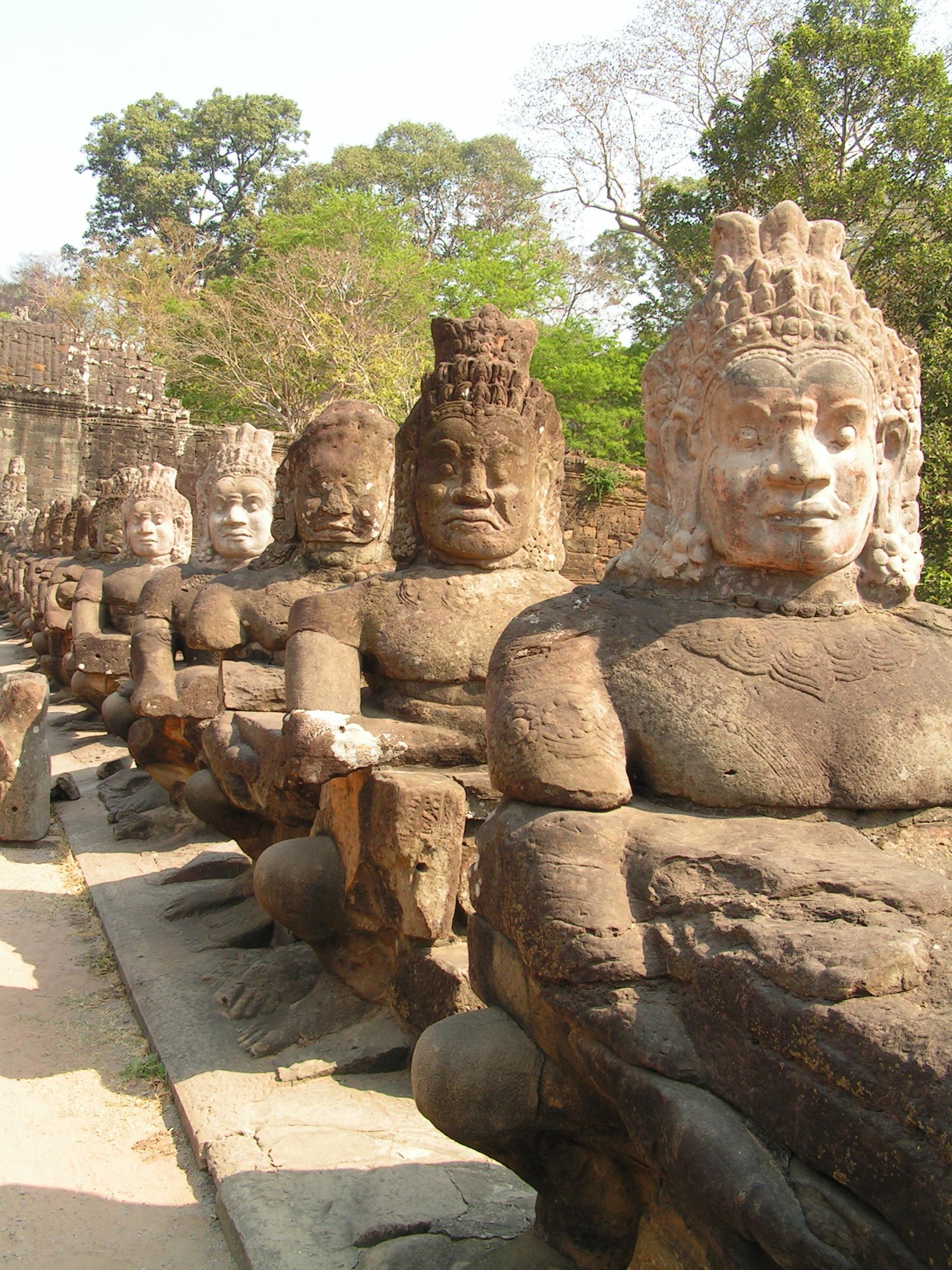
Stone Asuras hold the nāga Vasuki on a bridge leading into the 12th century city of Angkor Thom.

Nāga bridges are causeways or true bridges lined by stone balustrades shaped as nāgas.

In some Angkorian nāga-bridges, as for example those located at the entrances to 12th century city of Angkor Thom, the nāga-shaped balustrades are supported not by simple posts but by stone statues of gigantic warriors. These giants are the devas and asuras who used the nāga king Vasuki in order to the churn the Ocean of Milk in quest of the amrita or elixir of immortality. The story of the Churning of the Ocean of Milk or samudra manthan has its source in Indian mythology.

=== Quincunx ===
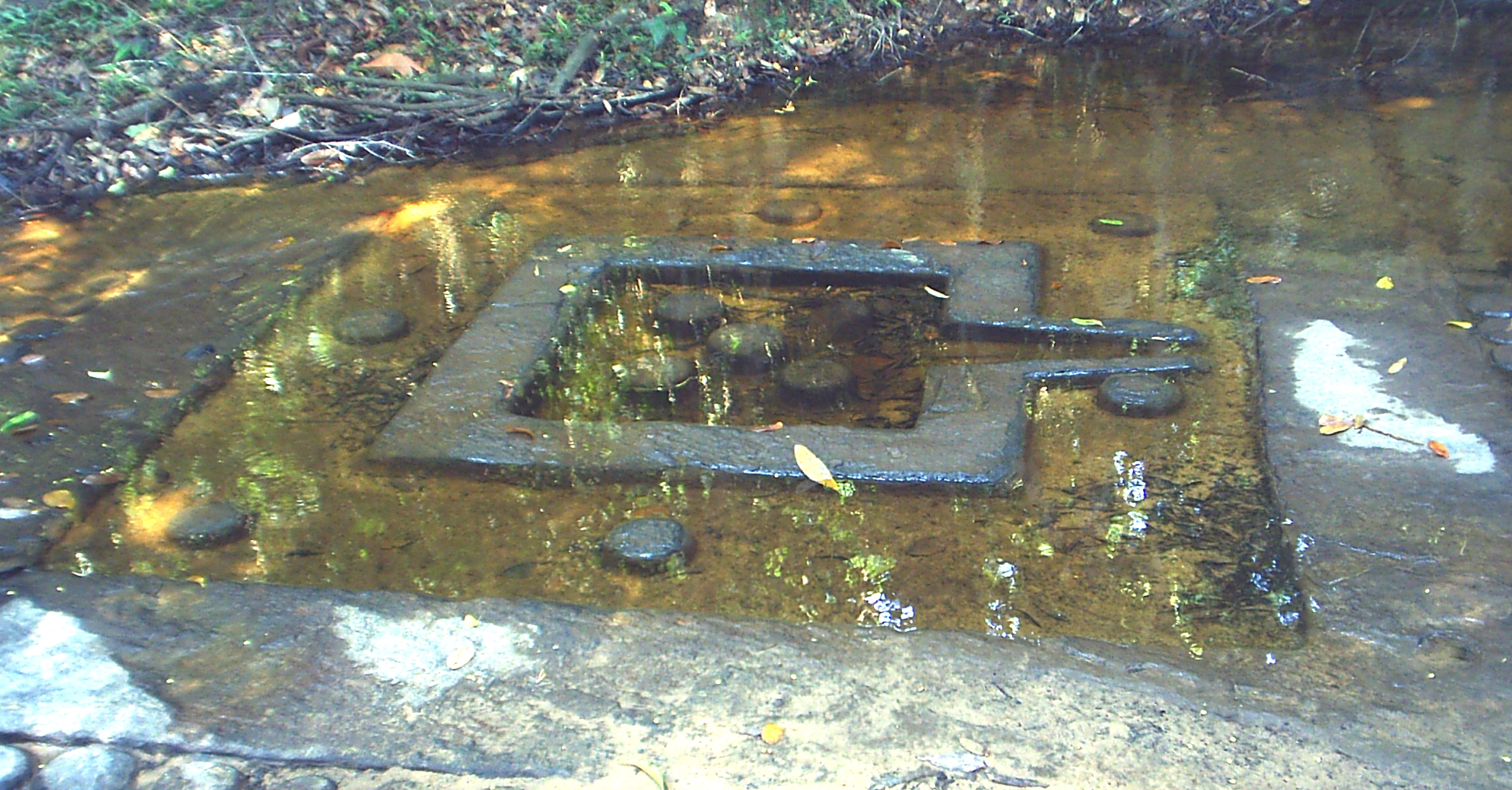
A linga in the form of a quincunx, set inside a yoni, is carved into the riverbed at Kbal Spean.

A quincunx is a spatial arrangement of five elements, with four elements placed as the corners of a square and the fifth placed in the center. The five peaks of Mount Meru were taken to exhibit this arrangement, and Khmer temples were arranged accordingly in order to convey a symbolic identification with the sacred mountain. The five brick towers of the 10th-century temple known as East Mebon, for example, are arranged in the shape of a quincunx. The quincunx also appears elsewhere in designs of the Angkorian period, as in the riverbed carvings of Kbal Spean.

=== Shiva ===
Most temples at Angkor are dedicated to Shiva. In general, the Angkorian Khmer represented and worshipped Shiva in the form of a lingam, though they also fashioned anthropomorphic statues of the god. Anthropomorphic representations are also found in Angkorian bas reliefs. A famous tympanum from Banteay Srei depicts Shiva sitting on Mount Kailasa with his consort, while the demon king Ravana shakes the mountain from below. At Angkor Wat and Bayon, Shiva is depicted as a bearded ascetic. His attributes include the mystical eye in the middle of his forehead, the trident, and the rosary. His vahana or mount is the bull Nandi.

=== Vishnu ===
Angkorian representations of Vishnu include anthropomorphic representations of the god himself, as well as representations of his incarnations or Avatars, especially Rama and Krishna. Depictions of Vishnu are prominent at Angkor Wat, the 12th-century temple that was originally dedicated to Vishnu. Bas reliefs depict Vishna battling with against asura opponents, or riding on the shoulders of his vahana or mount, the gigantic eagle-man Garuda. Vishnu's attributes include the discus, the conch shell, the baton, and the orb.

== Wooden architecture ==
=== Palaces ===
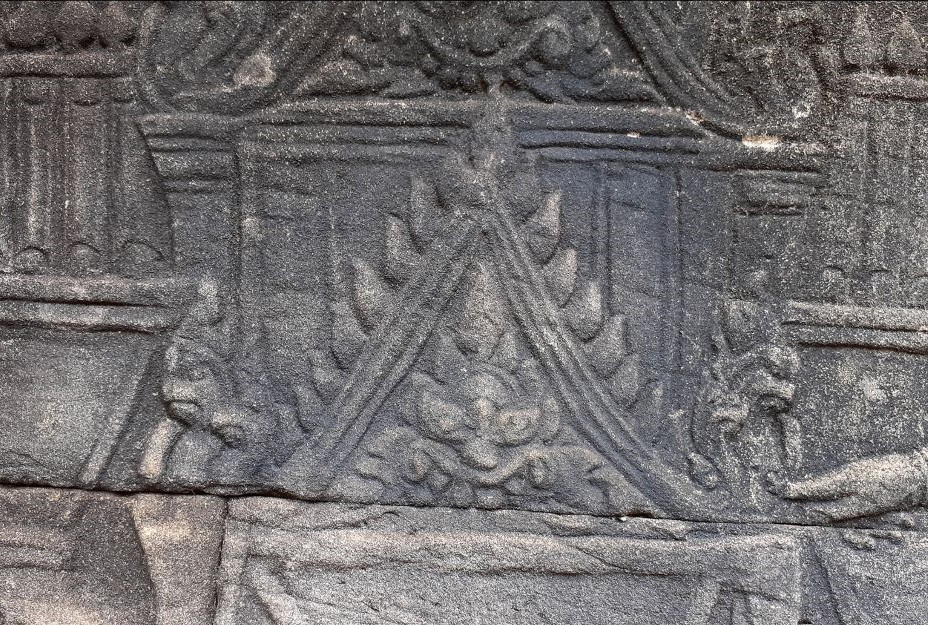
Triangular gabled roof depicted on a Bayon's bas relief still used in today Khmer architecture for palaces and pagodas.

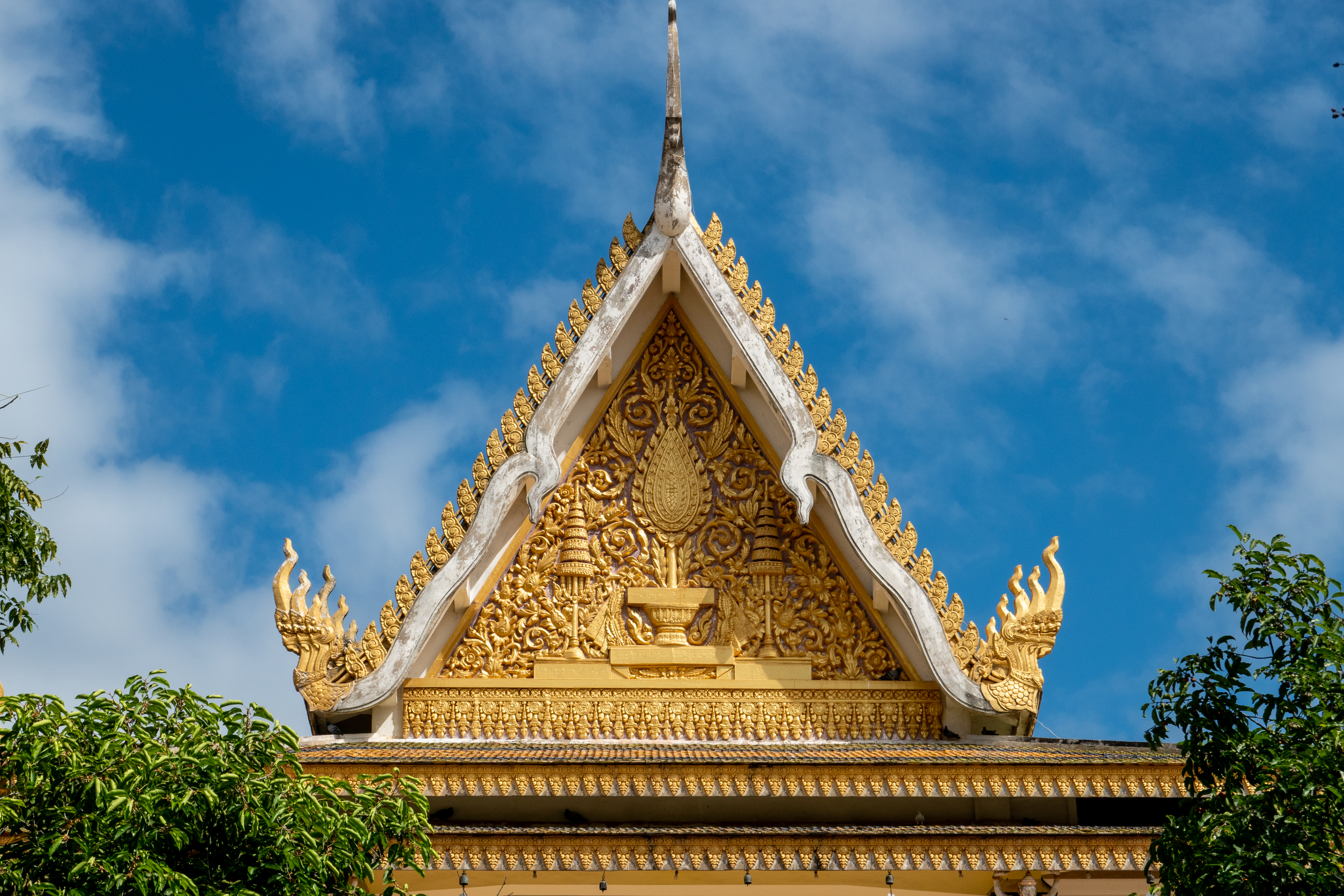
Wat Botum Watey Reacheveraram pagoda in Phnom Penh

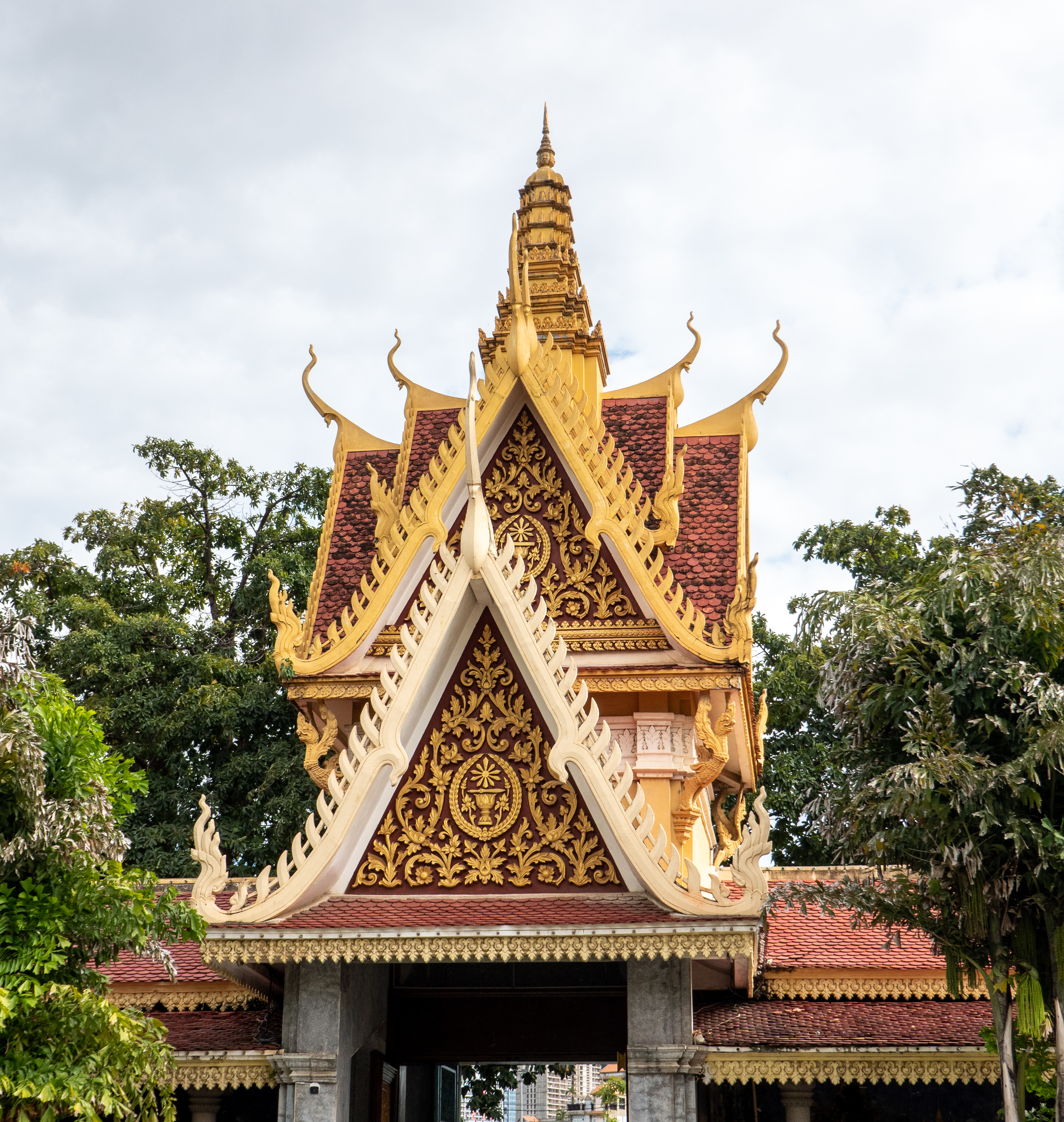
The Silver Pagoda Walled Compound Entrance

During the Angkor era, the architectural landscape consisted predominantly of temples constructed from durable materials such as brick, sandstone, and laterite. In stark contrast, the royal residences of the Khmer courts were predominantly crafted from wood and other perishable materials, rendering them susceptible to the ravages of time and leaving no trace of their existence in the present day. The enduring remnants of this era are the brick or stone temples, such as those found in the Angkor complex, which stand as the sole vestiges of what was once expansive wooden settlements and palaces. However, a meticulous 13th-century account by a Chinese emissary to Angkor provides a detailed description of the palace, depicting it as an assemblage of imposing structures crowned with lead-tiled roofs. Intricately carved bas reliefs at Bayon and Banteay Chhmar portray various wooden buildings featuring triangular pediments and roofs, identified as representative of the royal halls within Angkorian palaces. As the Khmer people gradually embraced Buddhism, a discernible transition from stone temples to wooden architecture occurred. This shift marked the adoption of wooden structures as the new norm in Khmer architecture, supplanting the erstwhile prominence of stone temples in earlier periods.

=== Ordinary housing ===
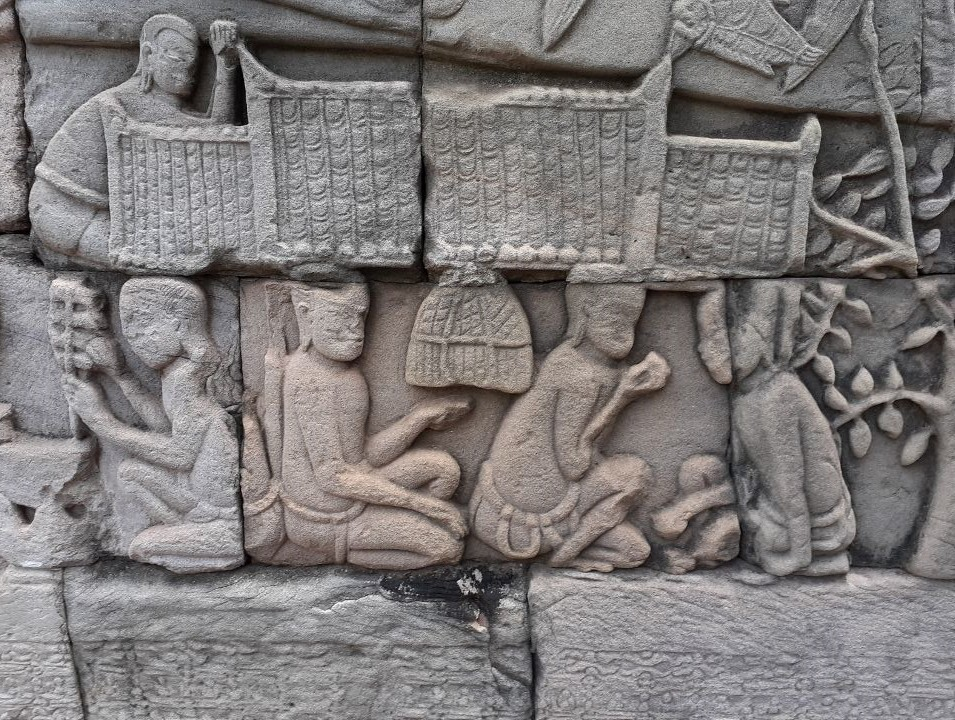
A double-tiered roof of Khmer wooden architecture as depicted at Bayon temple.

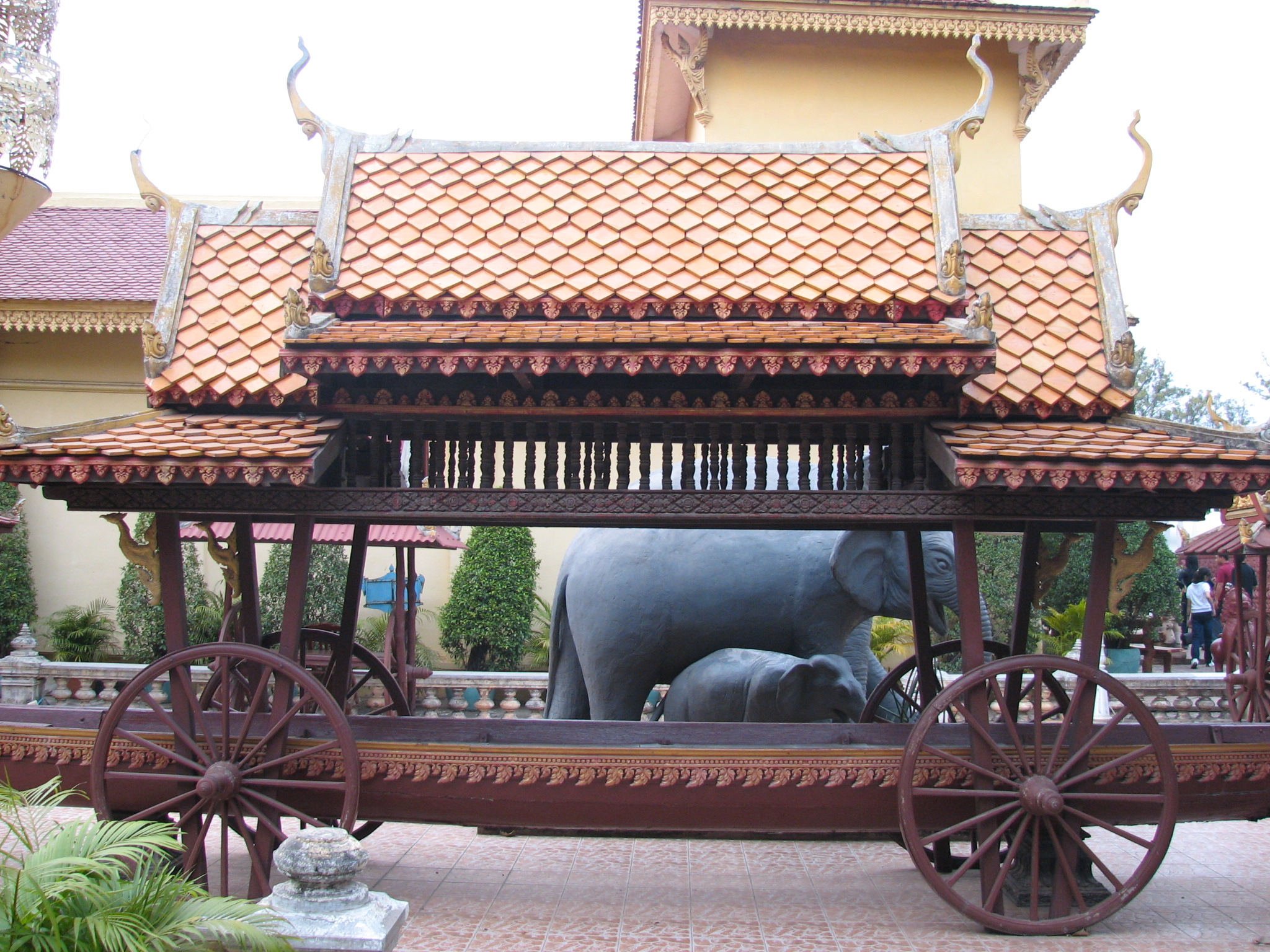
Typical double-tiered roof used in contemporary Khmer architecture

The nuclear family, in rural Cambodia, typically lives in a rectangular house that may vary in size from four by six meters to six by ten meters. It is constructed of a wooden frame with gabled thatch roof and walls of woven bamboo. Khmer houses typically are raised on stilts as much as three meters for protection from annual floods. Two ladders or wooden staircases provide access to the house. The steep thatch roof overhanging the house walls protects the interior from rain. Typically, a house contains three rooms separated by partitions of woven bamboo.

The front room serves as a living room used to receive visitors, the next room is the parents' bedroom, and the third is for unmarried daughters. Sons sleep anywhere they can find space. Family members and neighbors work together to build the house, and a house-raising ceremony is held upon its completion. The houses of poorer persons may contain only a single large room. Food is prepared in a separate kitchen located near the house but usually behind it. Toilet facilities consist of simple pits in the ground, located away from the house, that are covered up when filled. Any livestock is kept below the house.

Chinese and Vietnamese houses in Cambodian town and villages typically are built directly on the ground and have earthen, cement, or tile floors, depending upon the economic status of the owner. Urban housing and commercial buildings may be of brick, masonry, or wood.

== See also ==
- New Khmer Architecture
- Rural Khmer house
- Khmer sculpture
- Influence of Indian Hindu temple architecture on Southeast Asia
- History of Indian influence on Southeast Asia

== Bibliography ==
- Coedès, George. Pour mieux comprendre Angkor. Hanoi: Imprimerie d'Extrême-Orient, 1943.
- Forbes, Andrew; Henley, David (2011). Angkor, Eighth Wonder of the World. Chiang Mai: Cognoscenti Books. ASIN B0085RYW0O.
- Freeman, Michael and Jacques, Claude. Ancient Angkor. Bangkok: River Books, 1999. ISBN 0-8348-0426-3.
- Glaize, Maurice. The Monuments of the Angkor Group. 1944. A translation from the original French into English is available online at theangkorguide.com.
- Jessup, Helen Ibbitson. Art & Architecture of Cambodia. London: Thames & Hudson, 2004.
- Ngô Vǎn Doanh, Champa:Ancient Towers. Hanoi: The Gioi Publishers, 2006.
- Roveda, Vittorio. Images of the Gods: Khmer Mythology in Cambodia, Laos & Thailand. Bangkok: River Books, 2005.
- Sthapatyakam. The Architecture of Cambodia Phnom Penh: Department of Media and Communication, Royal University of Phnom Penh, 2012.
- Gabel, Joachim. Earliest Khmer Stone Architecture and its Origin: A Case Study of Megalithic Remains and Spirit Belief at the Site of Vat Phu.. In: JoGA 2022: 2–137, Journal of Global Archaeology.
