= Kutisvara =

Kutisvara (Kdei So)
- ប្រាសាទកុដិស្វរៈ (ក្តីសូរ)
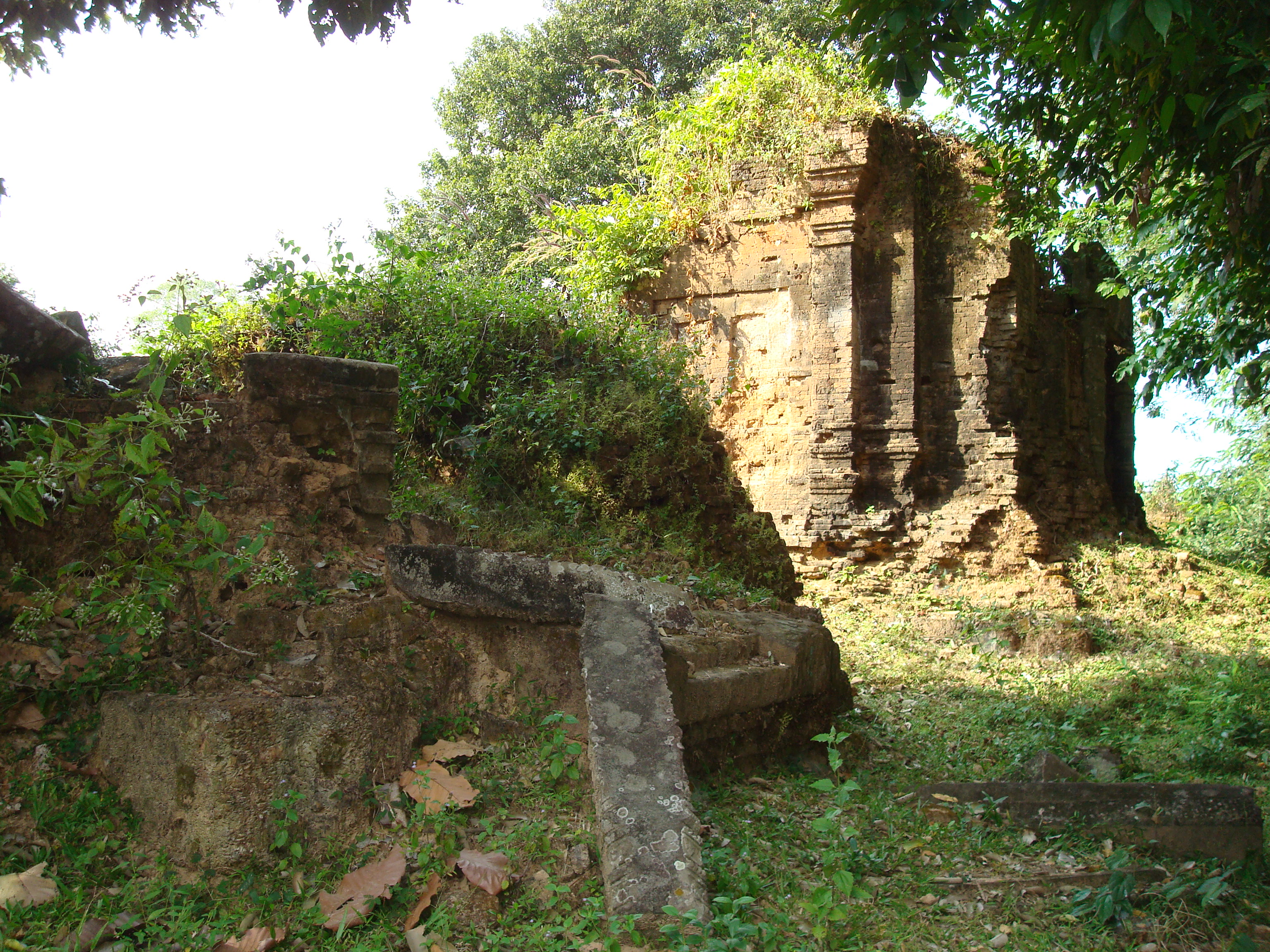
- Collapsed towers of Kutisvara

- Location within Cambodia

Religion
- Affiliation: Hinduism
- Province: Siem Reap
- Deity: Shiva

Location
- Location: Angkor
- Country: Cambodia
- Interactive map of Kutisvara (Kdei So)
- Coordinates: 13°26′02″N 103°53′59″E

Architecture
- Type: Khmer (Preah Ko for central tower, Pre Rup for others)
- Creator: Jayavarman II and Rajendravarman
- Completed: Early 9th century to mid 10th century AD
- Temple: 3 towers

Kutisvara or Kdei So (Khmer: ប្រាសាទកុដិស្វរៈ ឬ ក្តីសូរ) is a small brick temple consisting of three towers in ruined condition. It is the site of Kuti, mentioned in the stele of Sdok Kok Thom in connection with the 9th century of Jayavarman II. Besides, an inscription found on a stone reused for the building of Banteay Kdei next door mentions dedication to Shiva and the erection of two statues of Vishnu and Brahma by Shivacarya, one of Rajendravarman's priests in the 10th century.

There are three collapsed brick towers arranged in a north–south row on a raised earth all facing to east. The platform of the central tower is brick but the other two are built in laterite.

== Gallery ==
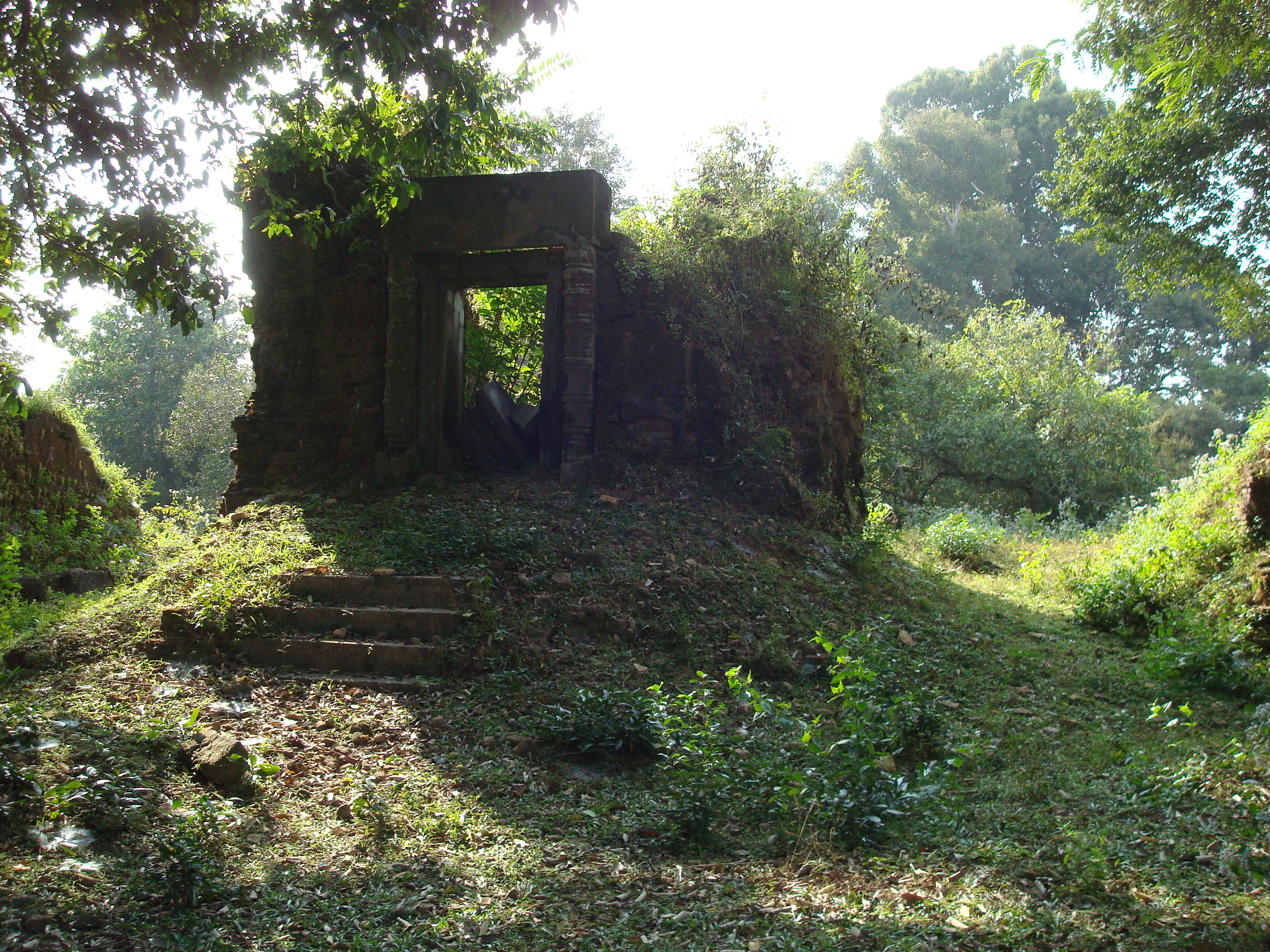

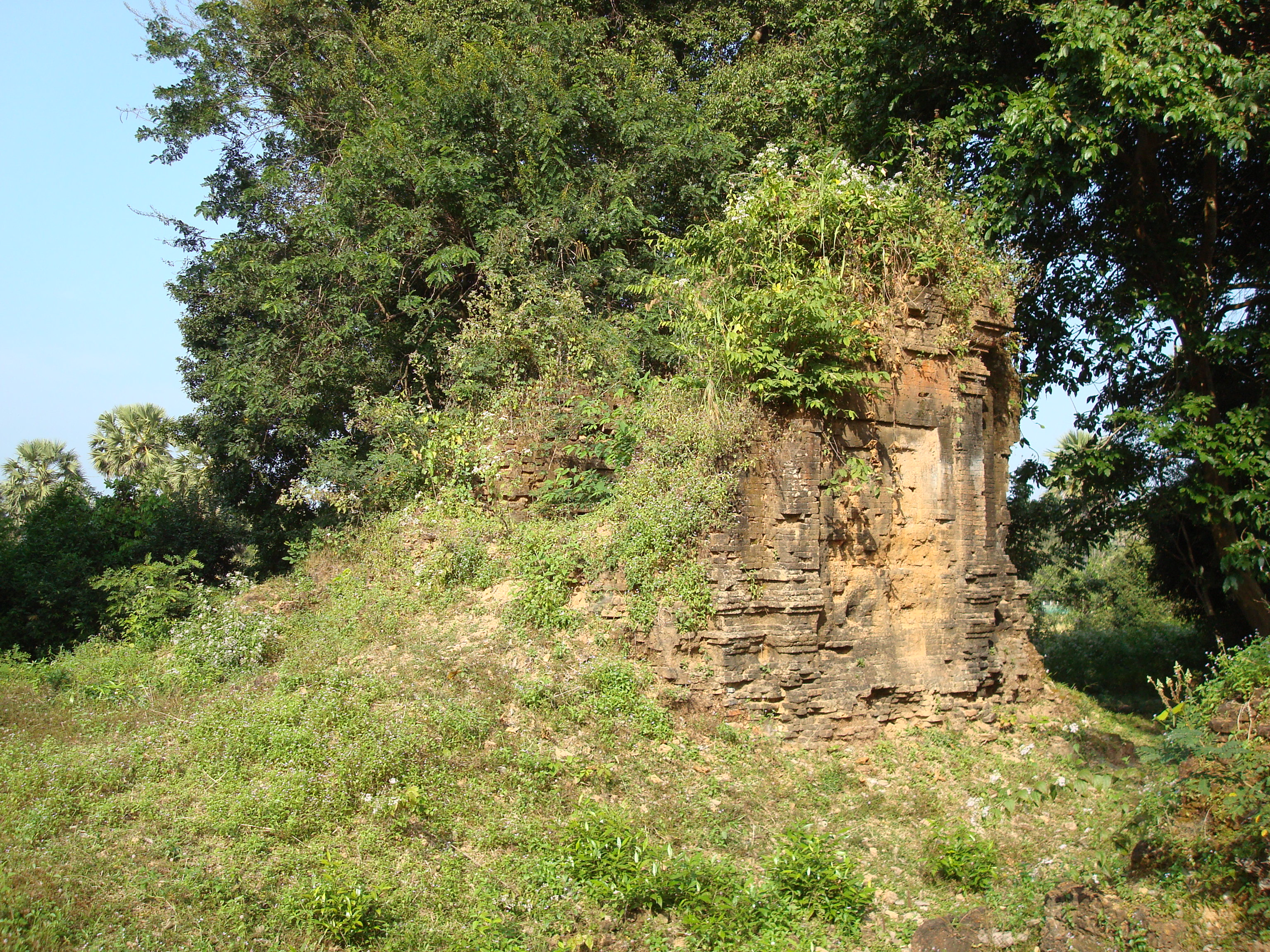

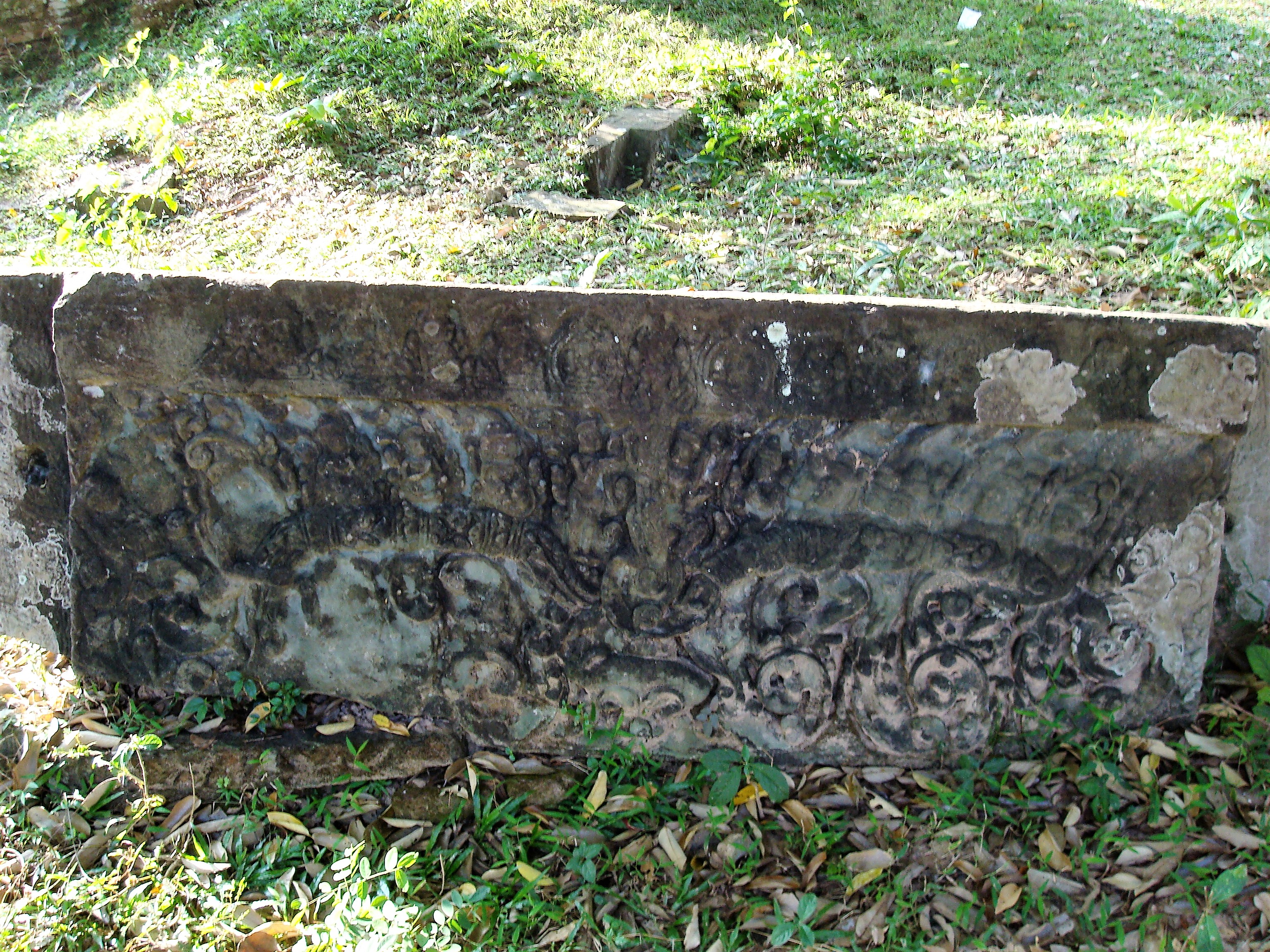

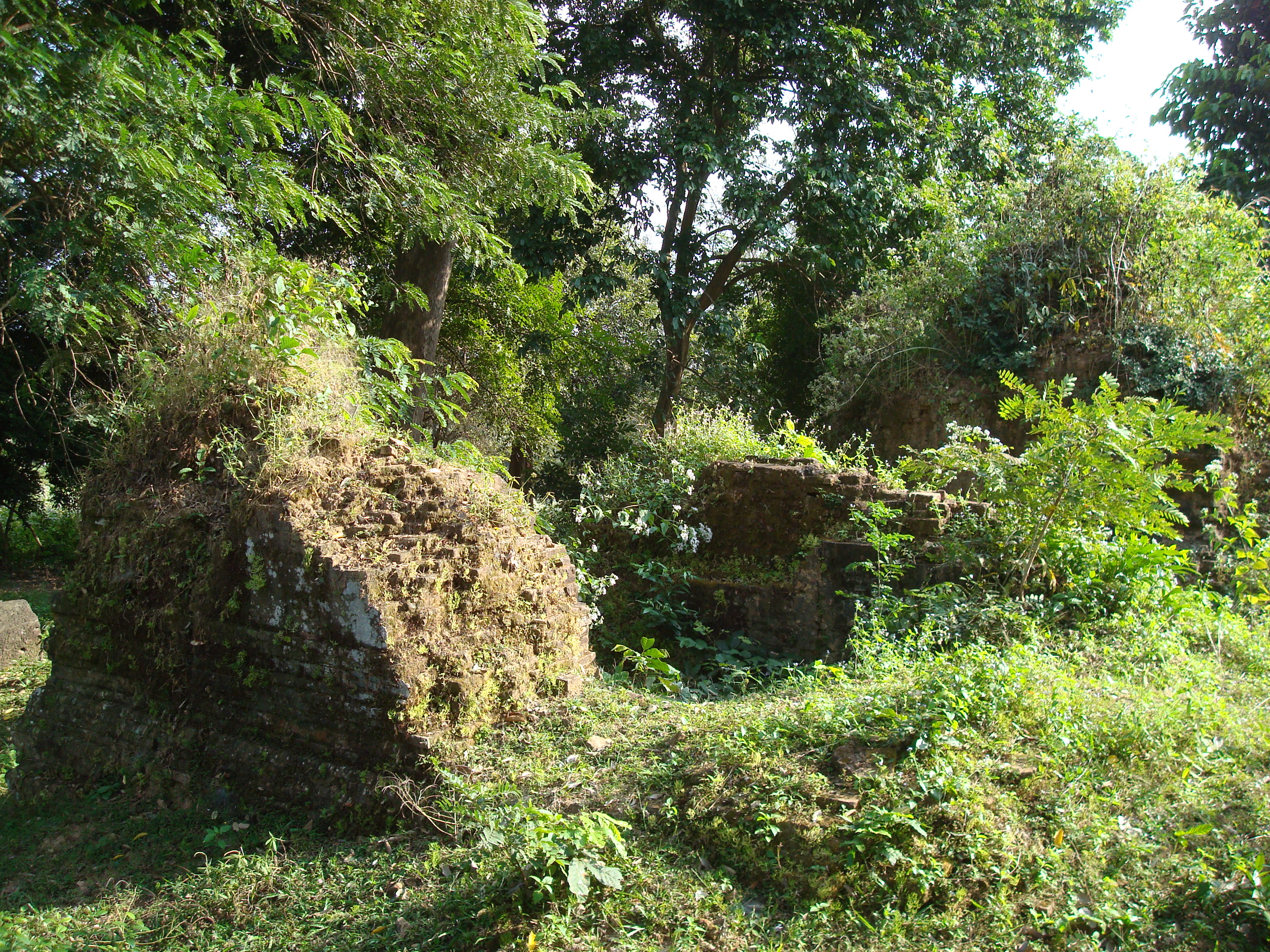
