= Ta Keo =

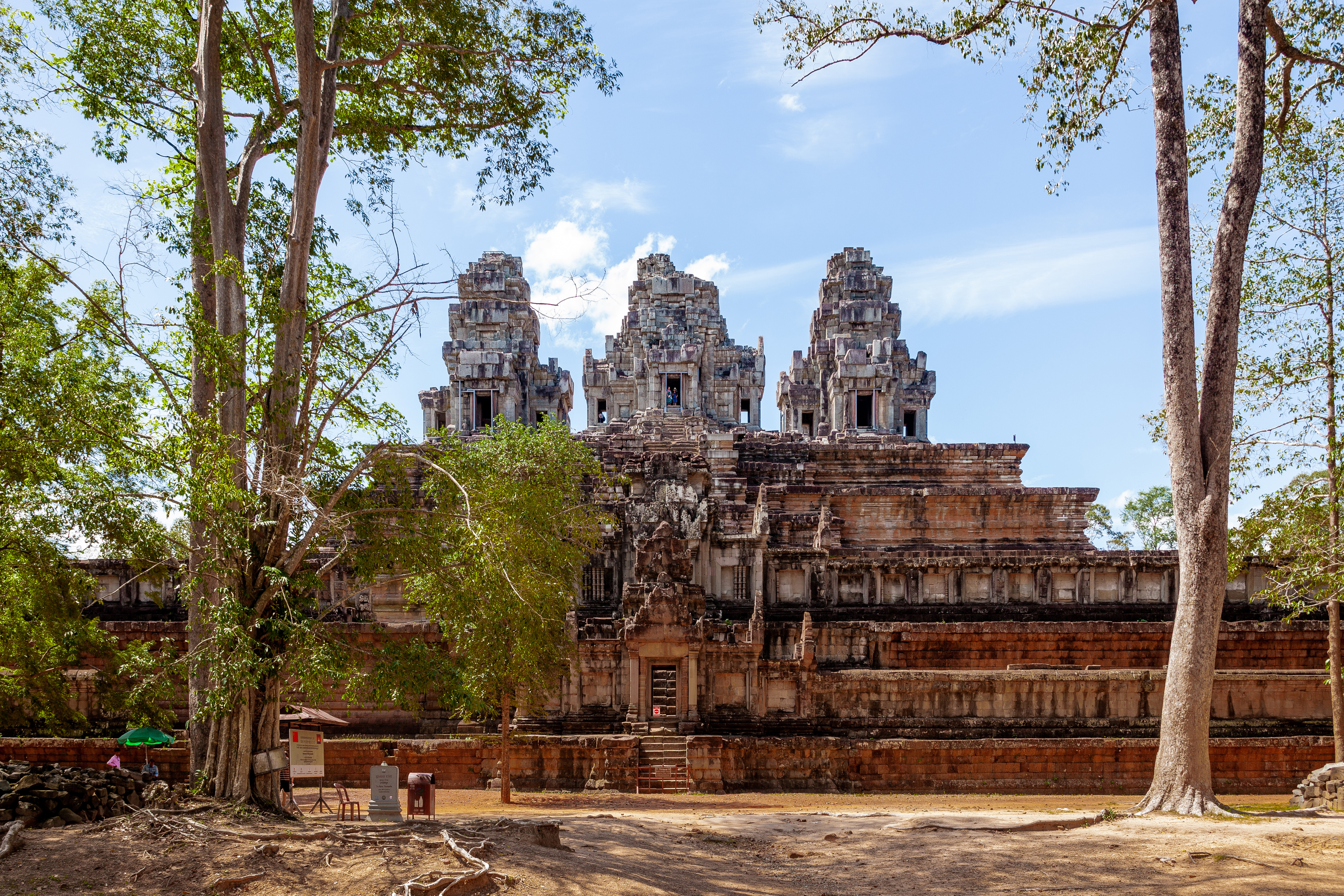
- Ta Keo Temple

- Location within Cambodia

Religion
- Affiliation: Hinduism
- Deity: Shiva

Location
- Location: between the Gate of Victory of Angkor Thom and East Baray
- Country: Cambodia
- Interactive map of Ta Keo
- Coordinates: 13.4447°N 103.882°E

Architecture
- Type: Khleang style
- Creator: Jayavarman V
- Completed: around 1000

Ta Keo (Khmer: ប្រាសាទតាកែវ, Prasat Ta Kêv [praːsaːt taːkaew]) is a temple-mountain in Angkor (Cambodia), possibly the first to be built entirely of sandstone by the Khmer Empire.

== The site ==
Ta Keo was the state temple of Jayavarman V, son of Rajendravarman, who had built Pre Rup. Like Pre Rup, it has five sanctuary towers arranged in a quincunx, built on the uppermost level of five-tier pyramid consisting of overlapping terraces (a step pyramid), surrounded by moats, as a symbolic depiction of Mount Meru.

Its particularly massive appearance is due to the absence of external decorations, as carving had just begun when the work stopped, besides an elaborate use of perspective effects. It is considered an example of the so-called Khleang style.

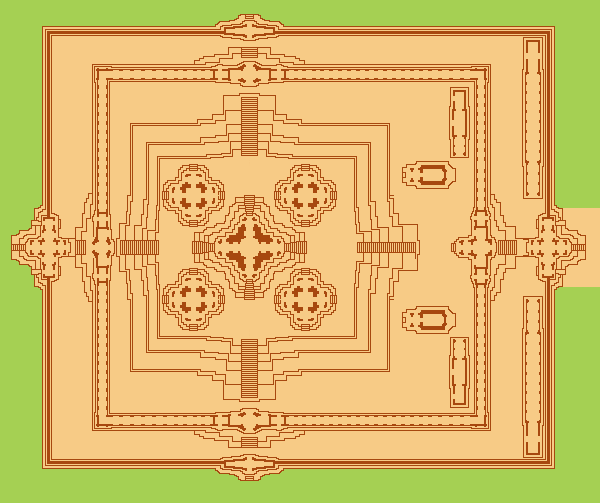
Plan of Ta Keo

The main axis of the temple is east-west and a 500 meters long causeway connects its eastern entrance to a landing stage on the East Baray, with which Ta Keo was in a tight relationship. The outer banks of the surrounding moats, now vanished, measured 255 m by 195 m.

The first terrace is 122 m by 106 m. Its wall of sandstone on laterite basis constitutes the outer enclosure. Along the east side there are two long galleries, whose roofs were made of wood and tiles. They were illuminated by balustrade windows.

The second terrace is 5.5 m higher. Each of the first two terraces has a gopura at the four cardinal points. Each gopura has three independent passages and a central tower with diminishing tiers.

A continuous gallery (1.4 m width) constitutes the inner enclosure of the second terrace. It has windows only towards the interior and measures 80 m by 75 m. It has no door and seems purely decorative. It is a first example of Khmer gallery (together with Phimeanakas). Before Ta Keo (e.g., in Pre Rup) there were long buildings that followed the length of enclosures with some discontinuity. However, it hasn't got a stone vault; its roof was possibly made of wood and tiles.

Along the eastern side of the second terrace in the corners there are two buildings that are the shorter version of the long galleries of the first terrace. More towards the central axis there are two little sandstone "libraries", opening to the west, with false windows on upper storeys.

The final pyramid rises 14 m in three narrow steps from the second terrace. Its base is 60 m square; the summit is 47 m square and stands 21.5 m above the ground. The four stairways that lead on the summit are continuous and very steep. At the foot of the eastern one there is a statue of a kneeling Nandi, which confirms that Ta Keo was a Shivaite temple. The absence of any decoration makes the final pyramid really massive. However, on the east face some damaged carvings of floral patterns are visible.

The four corner towers on the summit stand on 0.8 m high basements and open to the four cardinal points with protruding vestibules. In the central tower, which dominates the others from its basement 4 meters high, the vestibules are doubled. Fragments of lingas and several statues were found in the sanctuary chambers (some 4 meters wide) and around the towers. The central tower reaches a height of 45 meters.

== History ==
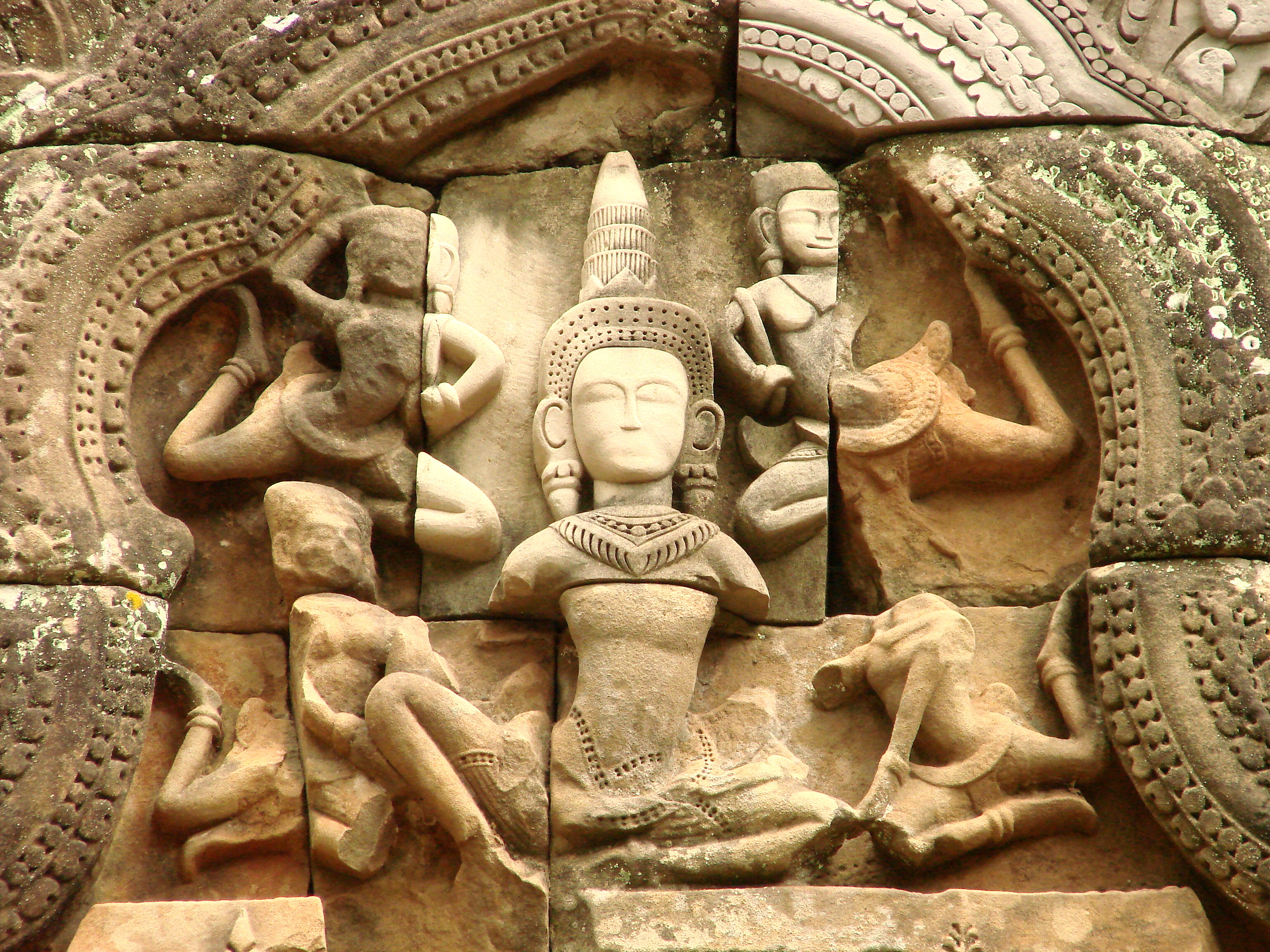
Detail of a sculpture at Ta Keo.

Jayavarman V was ten years old when he succeeded his father, Rajendravarman, in 968. His early years of reign were turbulent and the court officials dominated the royal politics. When he was 17 (in 975), he began the construction of his own state temple, whose modern name is Ta Keo, that was dedicated some time around 1000. In contemporary inscriptions it is called Hemagiri or Hemasringagiri ("the mountain with golden summits").

It remained unfinished until the reign of Suryavarman I. Yogisvarapandita, a high priest who became minister of Suryavarman I and "received" the temple from him many years later, says in inscriptions that a lightning strike hit the unfinished building, an evil omen, so the work stopped. Maybe work stopped simply because of the death of Jayavarman V, as there was a struggle for succession. The temple worked continuously as a cult center until the 13th century, and even Yogisvarapandita worshiped the shrines at the first levels of the temple.

A term tightly linked to Hemasringagiri is Jayendranagari (which in Sanskrit means "capital of the victorious king"), the royal palace or maybe the new capital city of Jayavarman V. However, the remains of this large hypothesized ensemble are very scarce. Today only a tower in the southwest survives, similar to the corner towers of Ta Keo, with an unusual single door to the south.

== Gallery ==
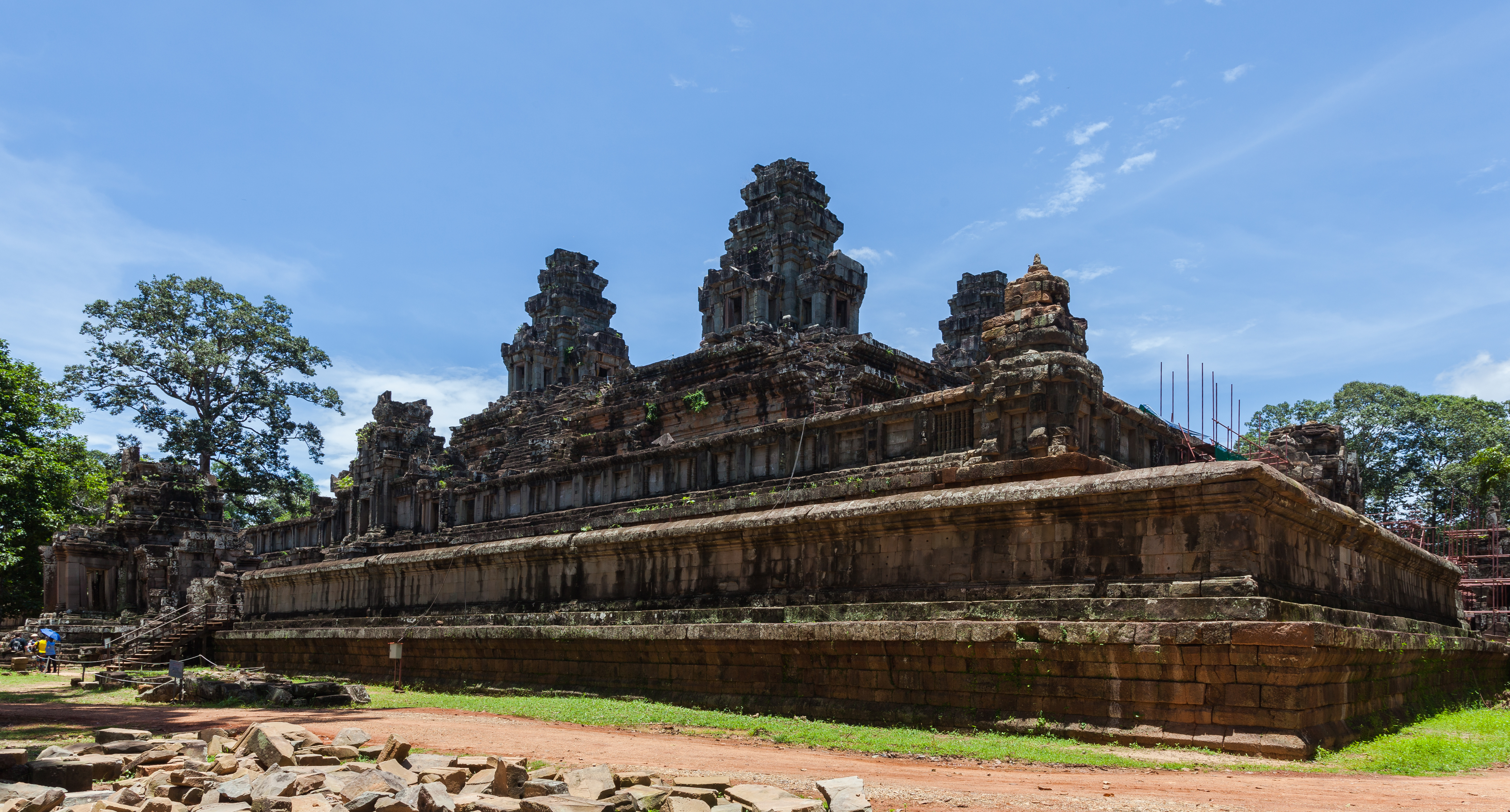
Exterior of Ta Keo

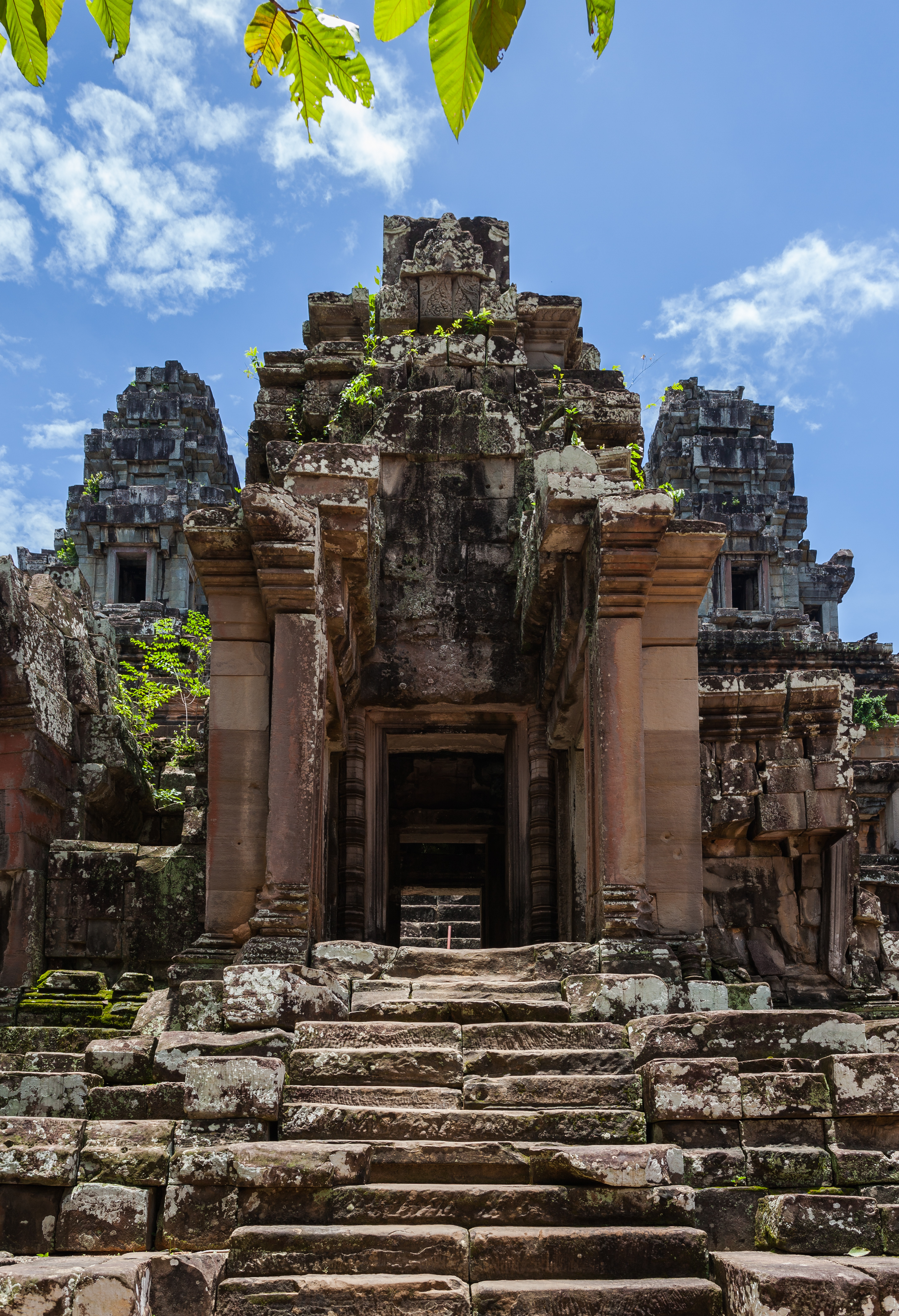
Ta Keo

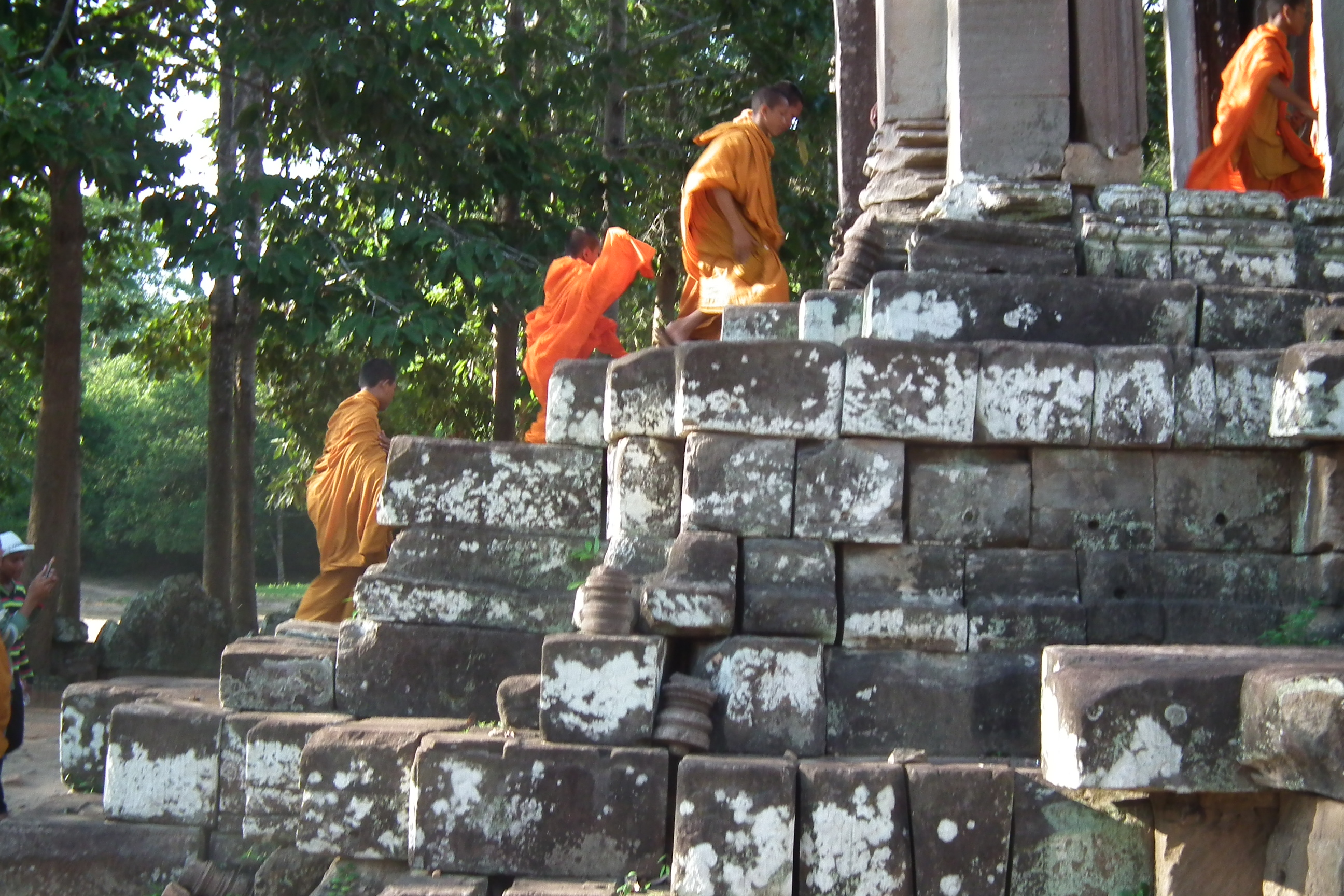
Monks in the south gate

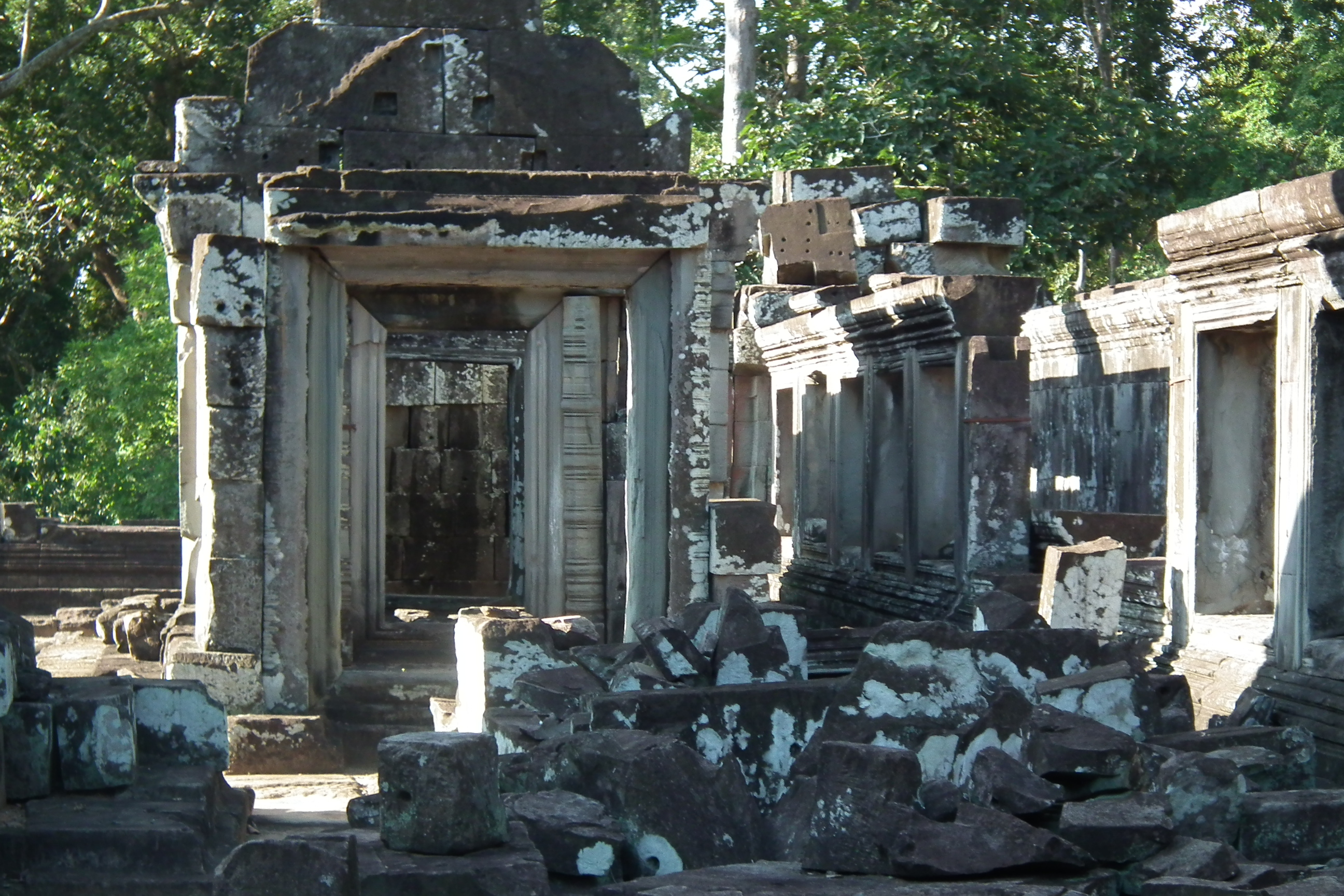
Ruins in the interior.

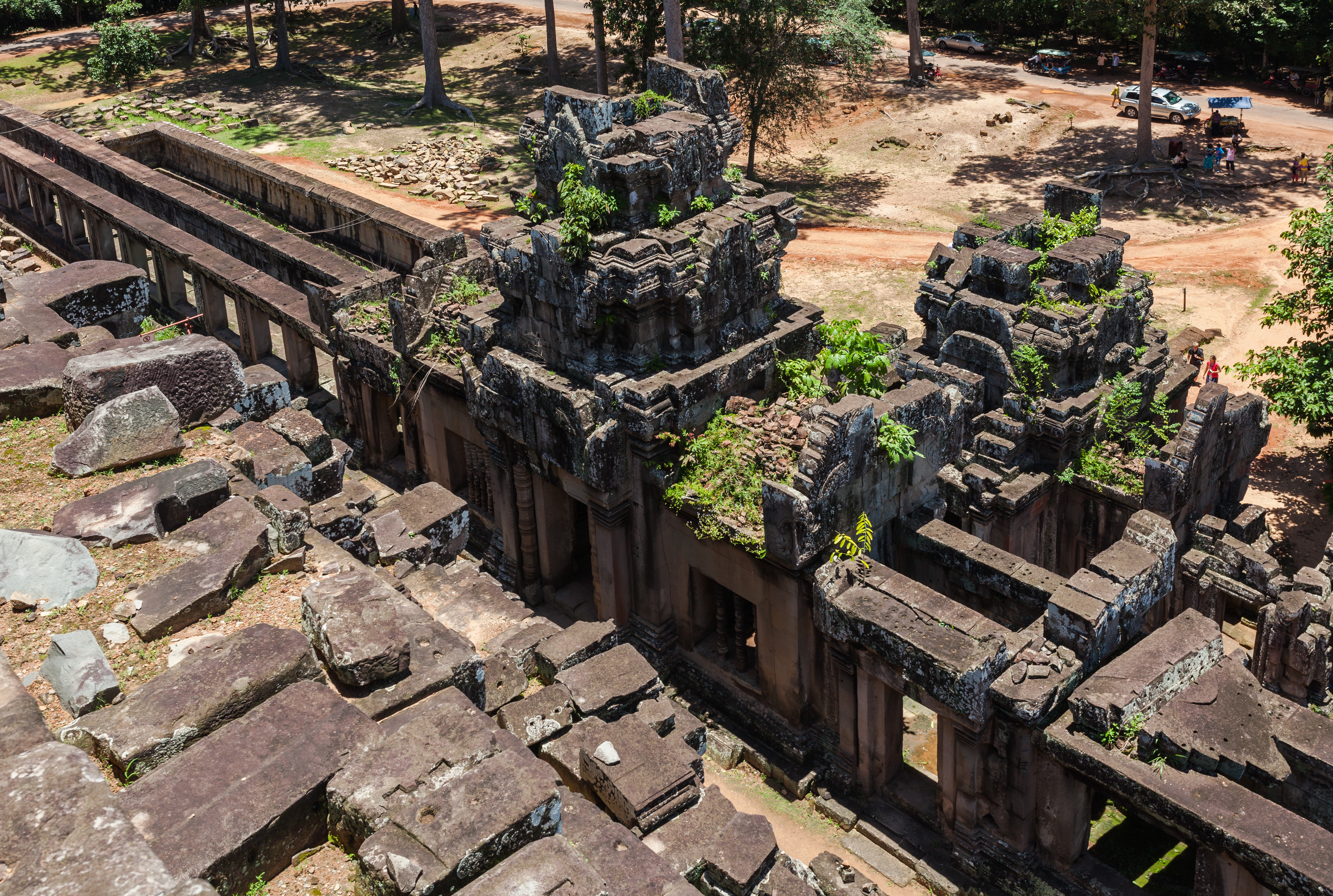
View of the complex from the top

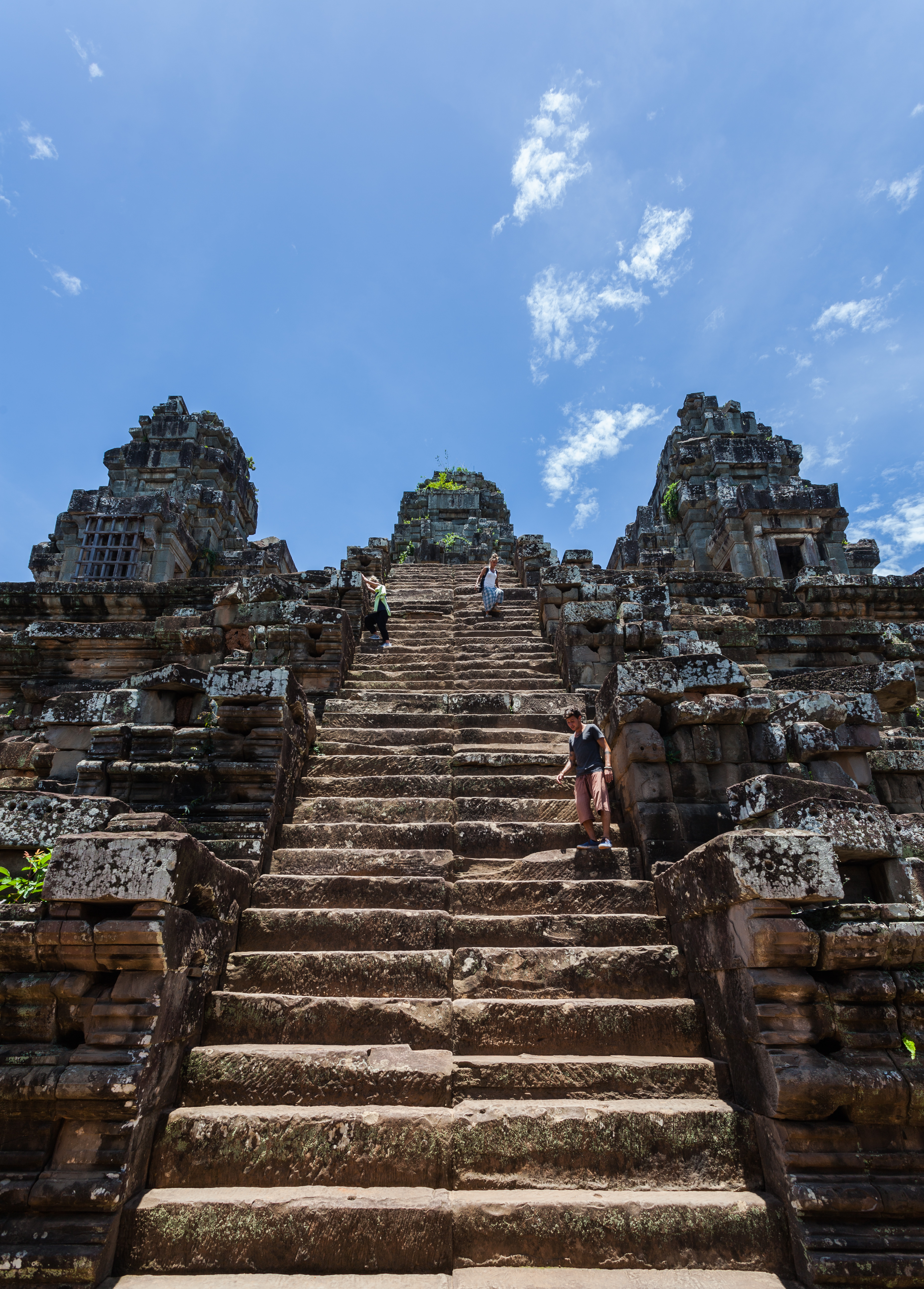
East side

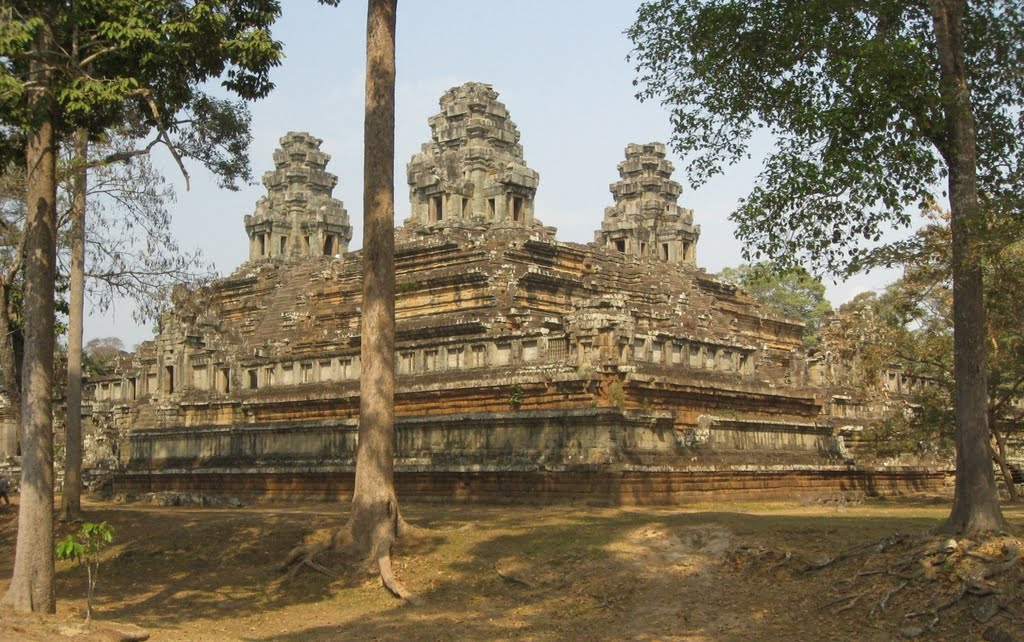
Southwest view of Ta Keo temple

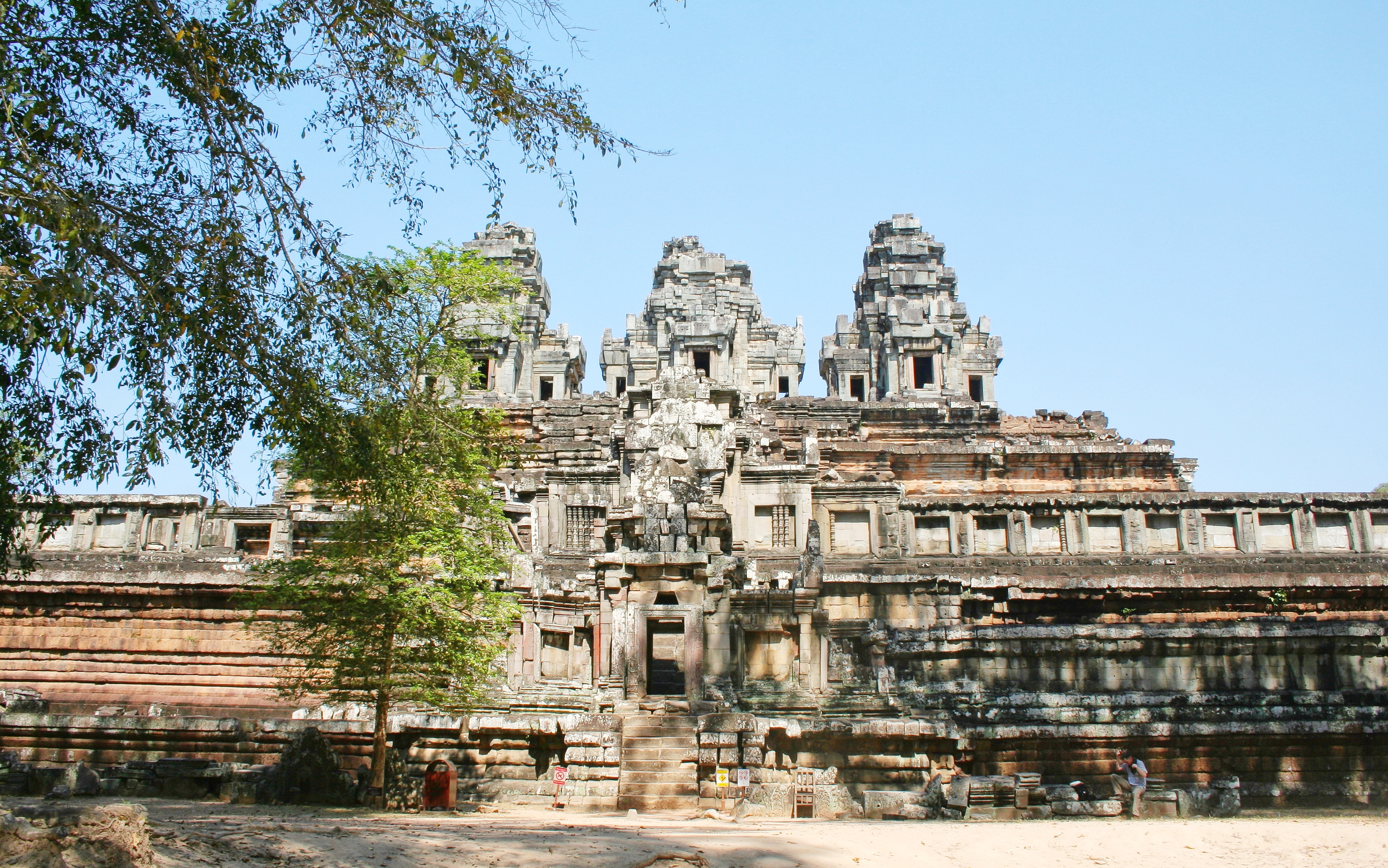
នៅប្រាសាទតាកែវ ១ - at Ta Keo 1

== See also ==
- Architecture of Cambodia
