= West Mebon =

- ប្រាសាទមេបុណ្យខាងលិច
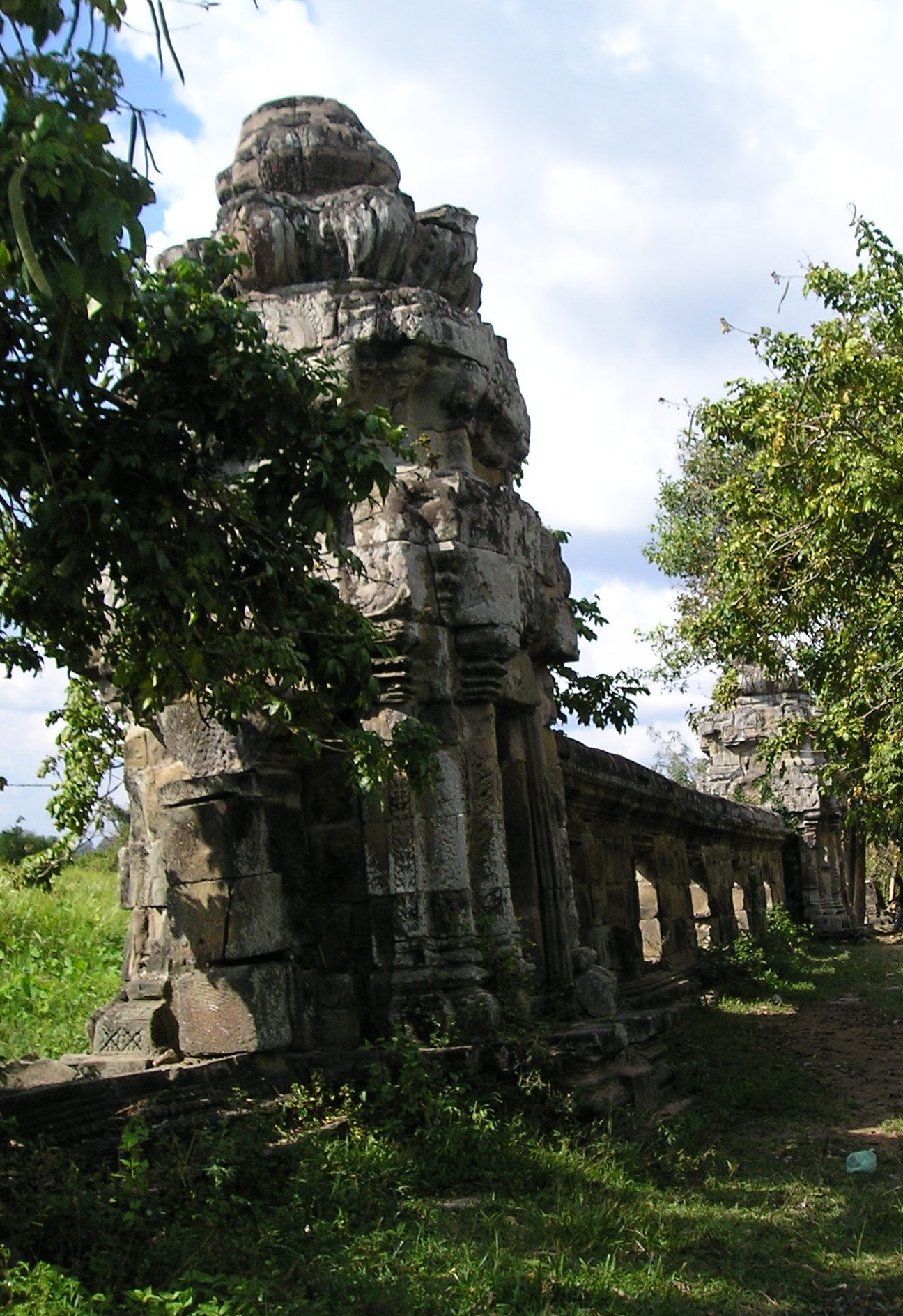
- Remaining east wall and towers

- Location within Cambodia

Religion
- Affiliation: Hinduism

Location
- Location: Angkor
- State: Siem Reap
- Country: Cambodia
- Interactive map of West Mebon
- Coordinates: 13°26′03″N 103°48′01″E

Architecture
- Type: Khmer (Baphuon style)
- Creator: Udayadityavarman II
- Completed: Mid 11th century AD

The West Mebon (Khmer: មេបុណ្យខាងលិច, Mébŏn Khang Lĭch, pronounced [mei.bon kʰaːŋ lɨc]) is a temple at Angkor, Cambodia, located in the center of the West Baray, the largest reservoir of the Angkor area. The temple's date of construction is not known, but evidence suggests the 11th Century during the reign of King Suryavarman I and Udayadityavarman II.

== Location ==
In the dry season today, it is reachable by land. In rainy season, the waters of the 7,800-meter-long baray rise and the temple, located on a site higher than the baray's floor, becomes an island.

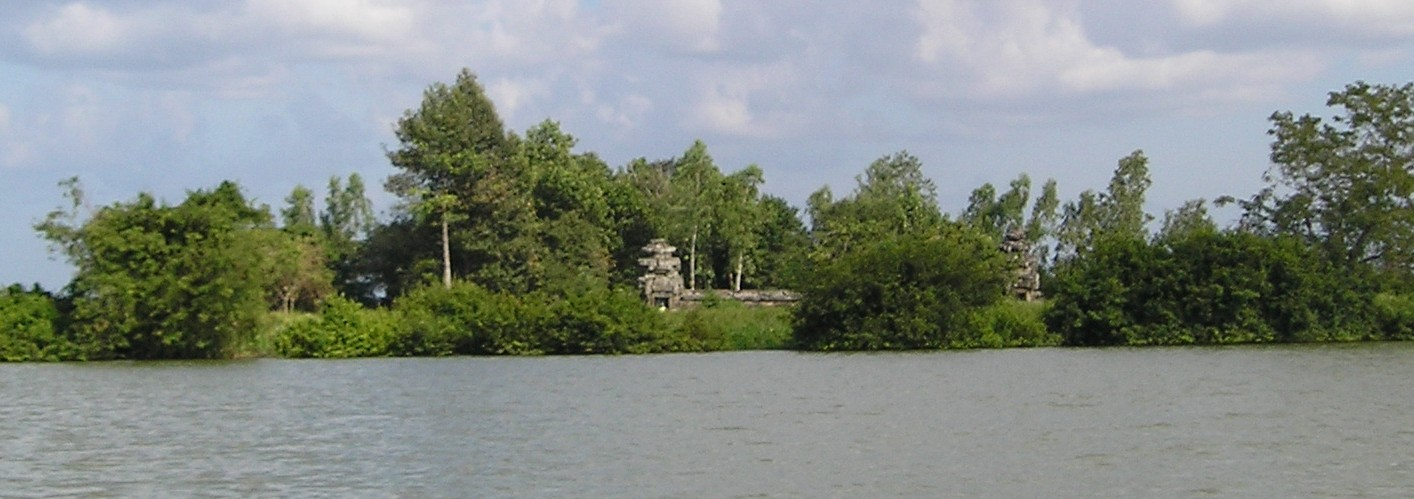
West Mebon from the water

== Symbolism ==
Khmer architects typically surrounded temples with moats that represent the Hindu sea of creation. The West Mebon, located amid waters so vast that they can seem like a real sea, takes this religious symbolism to the ultimate level.

== Architecture ==
The temple was built to a square design, with sides measuring about 100 meters. Each side had three tower-passages crowned with stone lotus flowers and arrayed about 28 meters apart. In the center of the square was a stone platform linked to the eastern wall by a laterite and sandstone causeway.

Today the platform, causeway and much of the east wall and towers remain; the other sides are largely gone, though their outlines in stone are visible when the baray's waters are low. There is no central sanctuary to be seen, though the platform may have supported some comparatively small structure in times past.

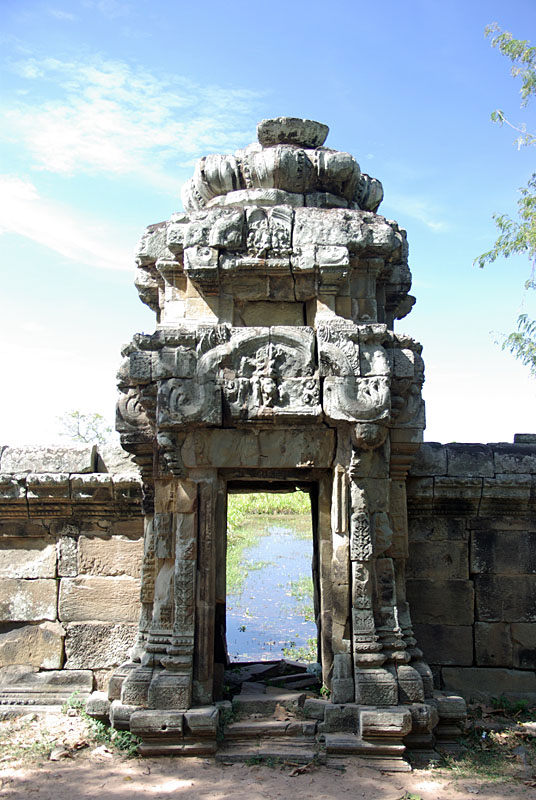

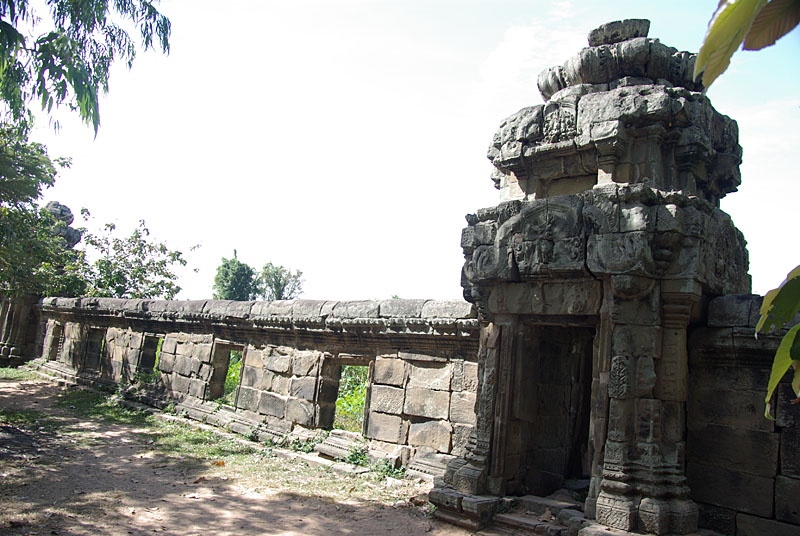

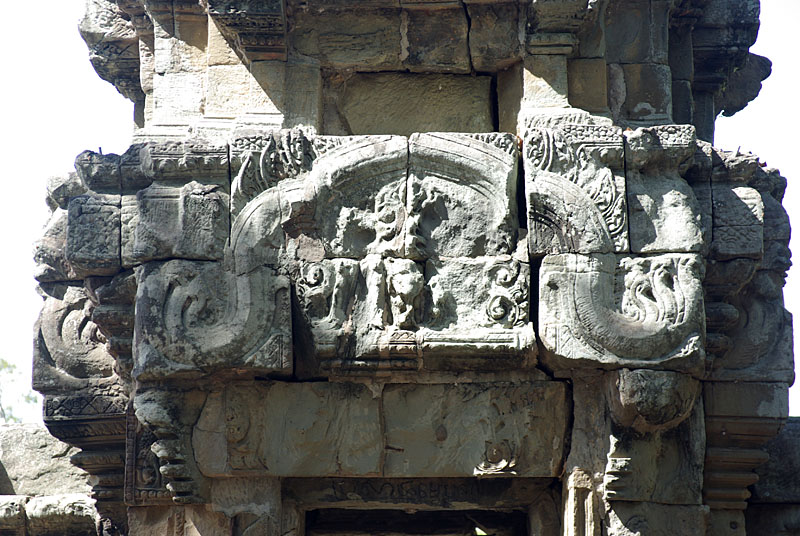

== The Reclining Vishnu ==
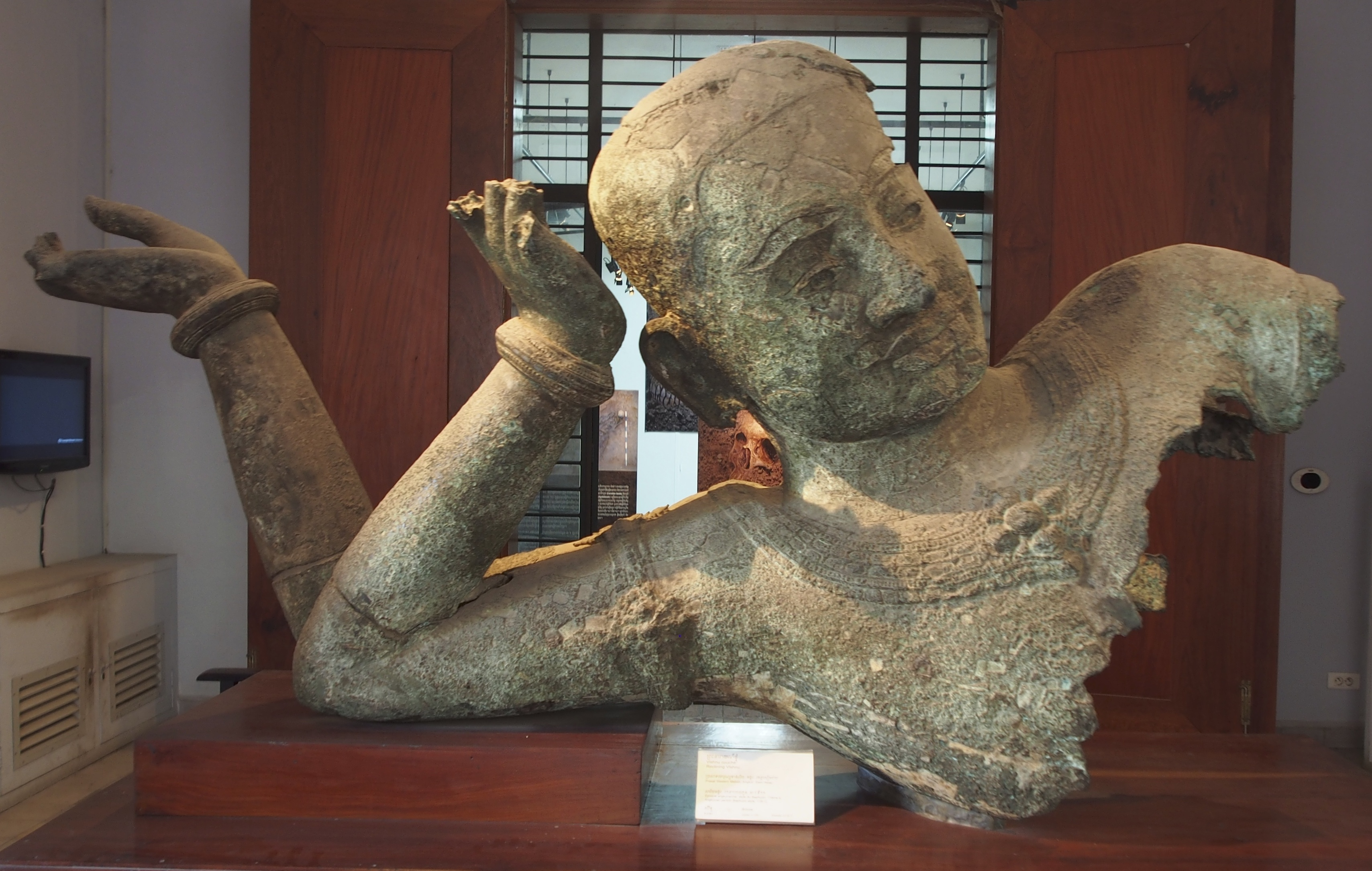
The Reclining Vishnu, located at the National Museum of Cambodia.

In 1936, the West Mebon yielded up the largest known bronze sculpture in Khmer art, a fragment of the reclining Hindu god Vishnu. The fragment includes the god's head, upper torso and two right arms.

A local villager is said to have dreamt that an image of the Buddha was buried in the West Mebon and wished to be freed from the soil. Subsequent digging unearthed the statue of Vishnu.

The Chinese diplomat Zhou Daguan, who visited Angkor at the end of the 13th Century, wrote that the West Mebon had a large image of Buddha with cascading water. Zhou mistook the Vishnu statue for a Buddha image, and the West Mebon for the East Mebon.

The statue, which in complete form would have measured about six meters long, entered the collection of the National Museum in Phnom Penh. It has also been shown abroad, including in Washington D.C.

== See also ==
- Angkor
- East Mebon
- Architecture of Cambodia
- Pre Rup
