= East Mebon =

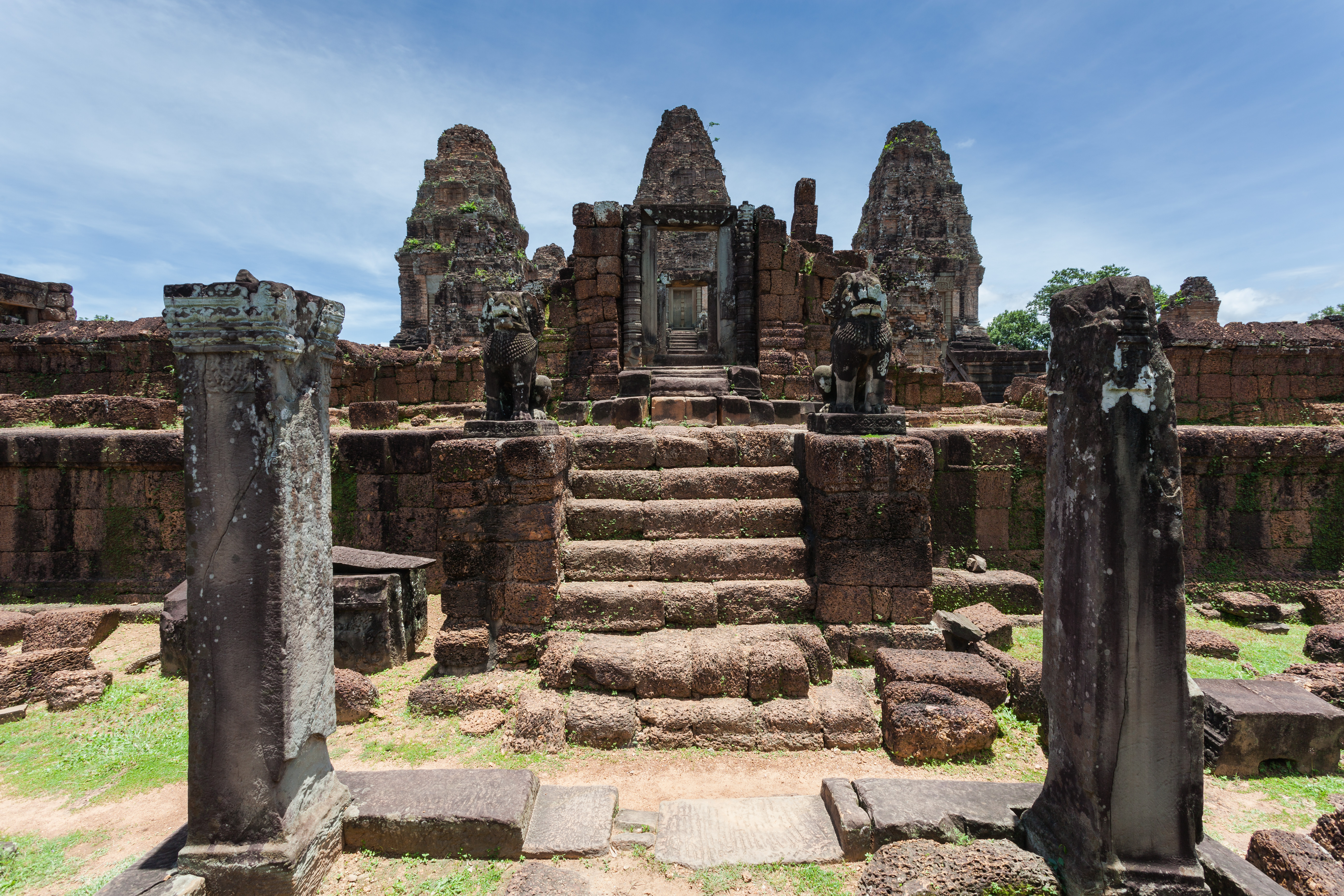

- Location in Cambodia

Religion
- Affiliation: Hinduism
- Deity: Shiva

Location
- Location: Angkor
- Country: Cambodia
- Interactive map of East Mebon
- Coordinates: 13°26′48″N 103°55′12″E

Architecture
- Type: Khmer
- Creator: Rajendravarman
- Completed: 10th century A.D.

The East Mebon (Khmer: ប្រាសាទមេបុណ្យខាងកើត) is a 10th Century temple at Angkor, Cambodia. Built during the reign of King Rajendravarman, it stands on what was an artificial island at the center of the now dry East Baray reservoir.

The East Mebon was dedicated to the Hindu god Shiva and honors the parents of the king. Its location reflects Khmer architects’ concern with orientation and cardinal directions. The temple was built on a north–south axis with Rajendravarman's state temple, Pre Rup, located about 1,200 meters to the south just outside the baray. The East Mebon also lies on an east–west axis with the palace temple Phimeanakas, another creation of Rajendravarman's reign, located about 6,800 meters due west.

Built in the general style of Pre Rup, the East Mebon was dedicated in 953 CE. It has two enclosing walls and three tiers. It includes the full array of durable Khmer construction materials: sandstone, brick, laterite and stucco. At the top is a central tower on a square platform, surrounded by four smaller towers at the platform's corners. The towers are of brick; holes that formerly anchored stucco are visible.

The sculpture at the East Mebon is varied and exceptional, including two-meter-high free-standing stone elephants at corners of the first and second tiers. Religious scenes include the god Indra atop his three-headed elephant Airavata, and Shiva on his mount, the sacred bull Nandi. Carving on lintels is particularly elegant.

Visitors looking out from the upper level today are left to imagine the vast expanses of water that formerly surrounded the temple. Four landing stages at the base give reminder that the temple was once reached by boat.

== Gallery ==
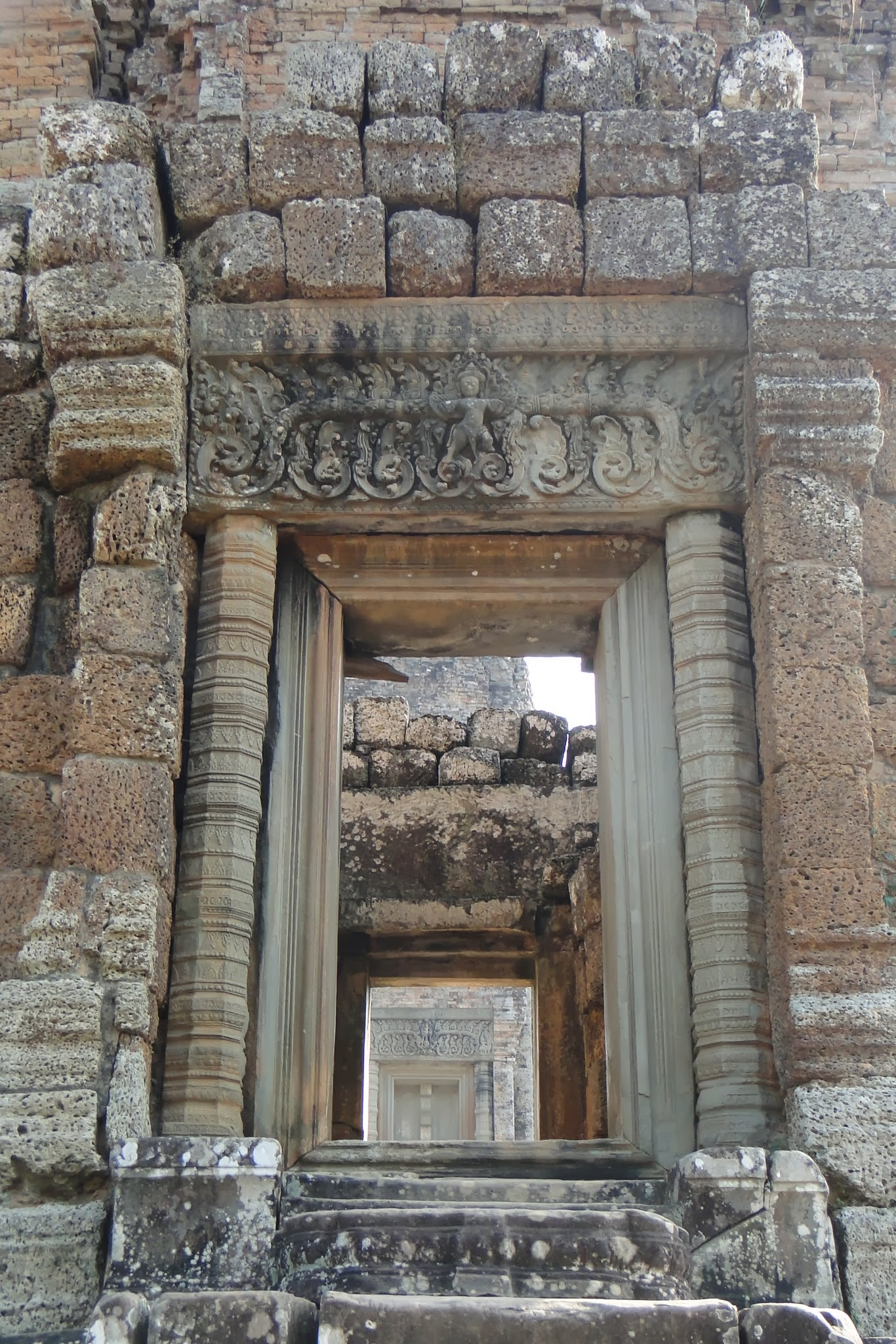
Main gate

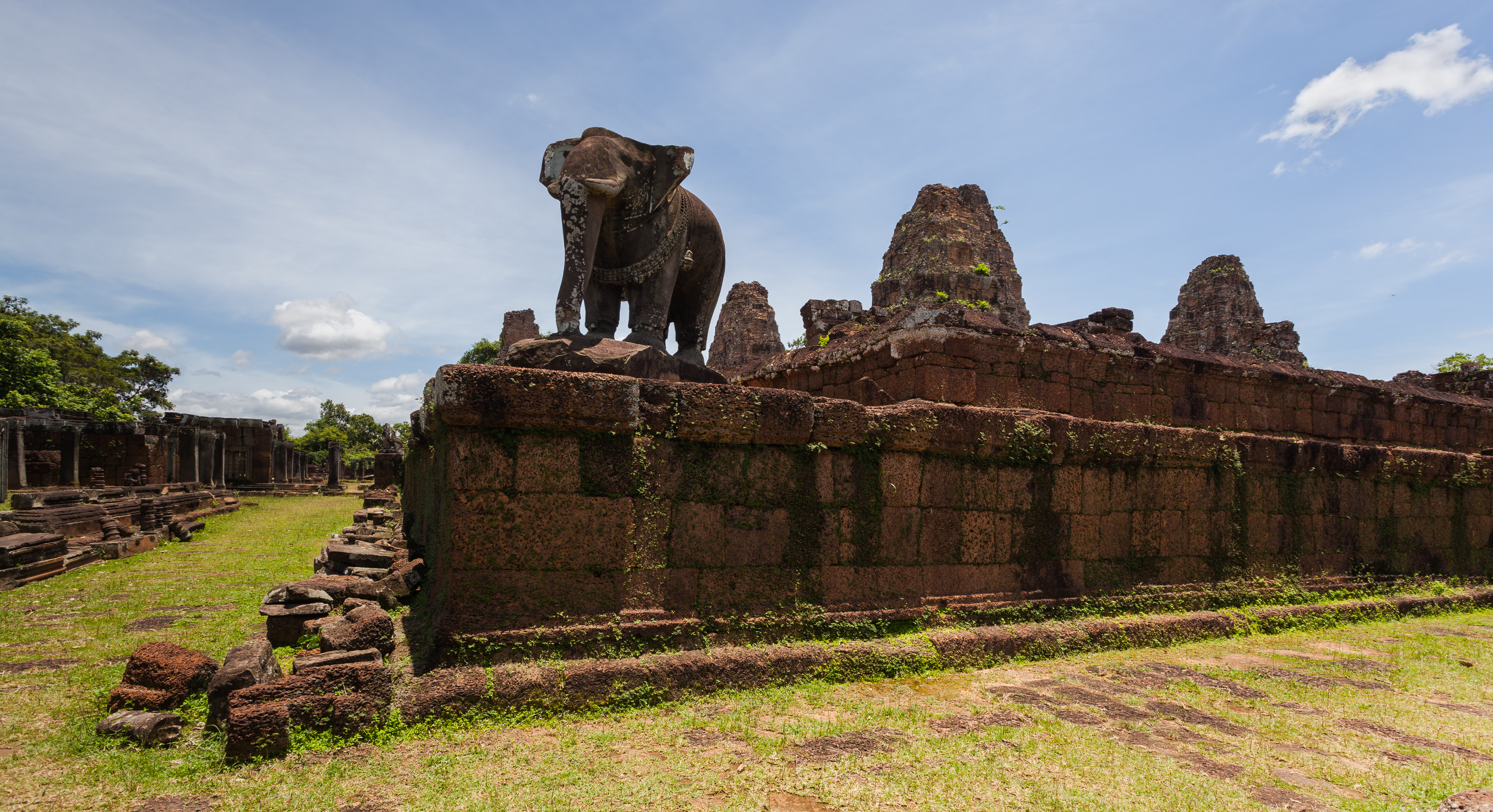
East Mebon guardian elephant

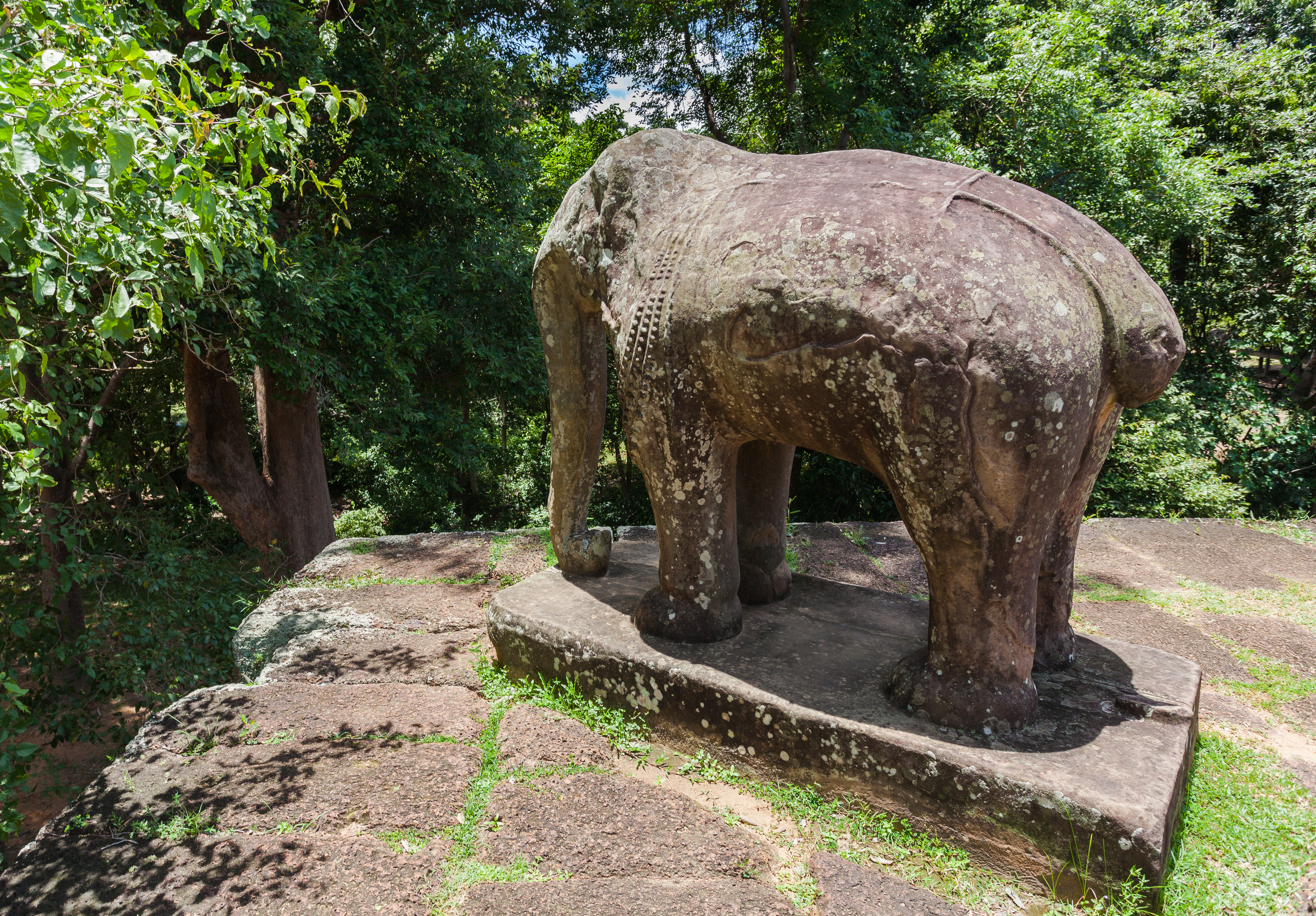
Elephant sculpture at the East Mebon

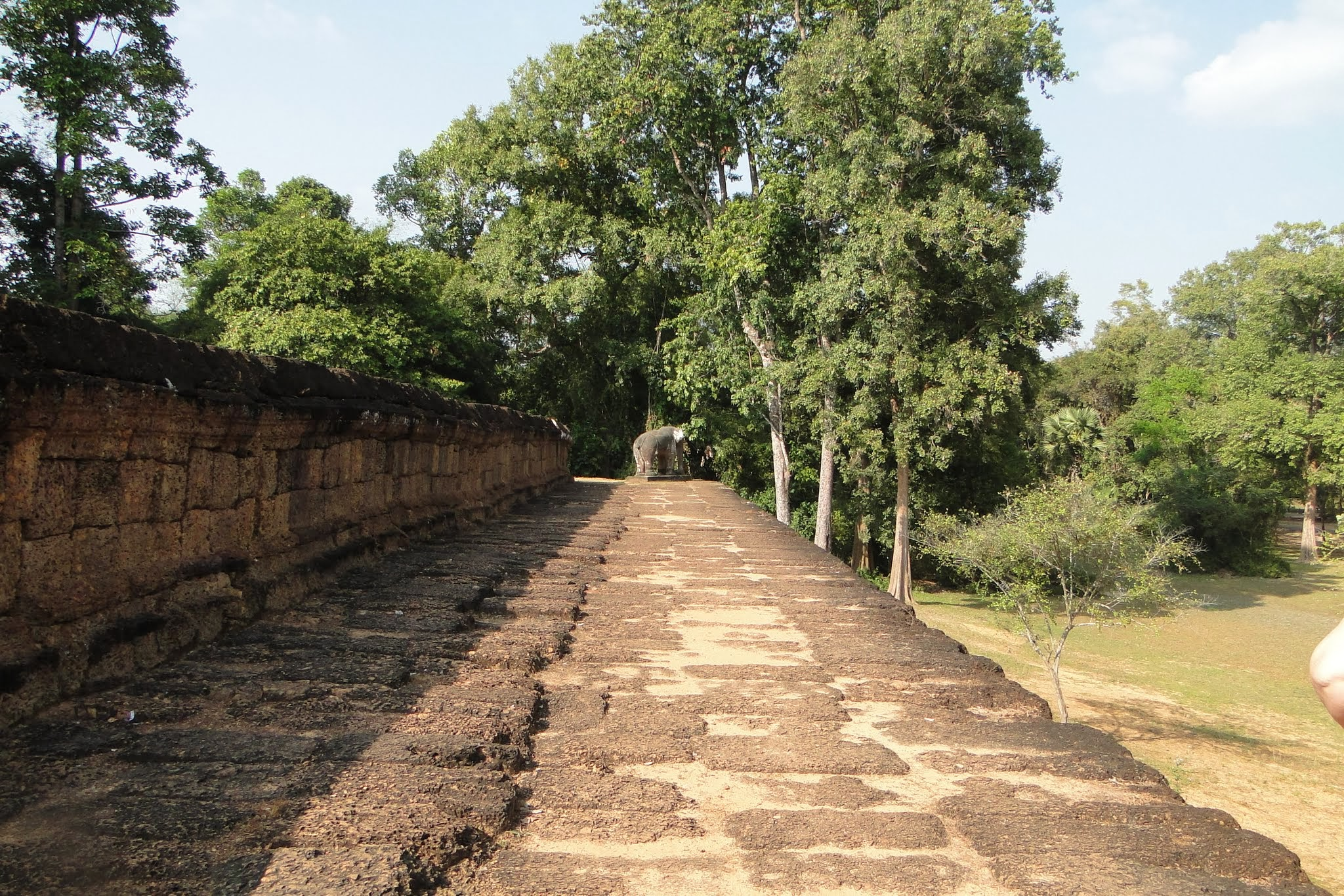
Lower terrace with elephant sculpture

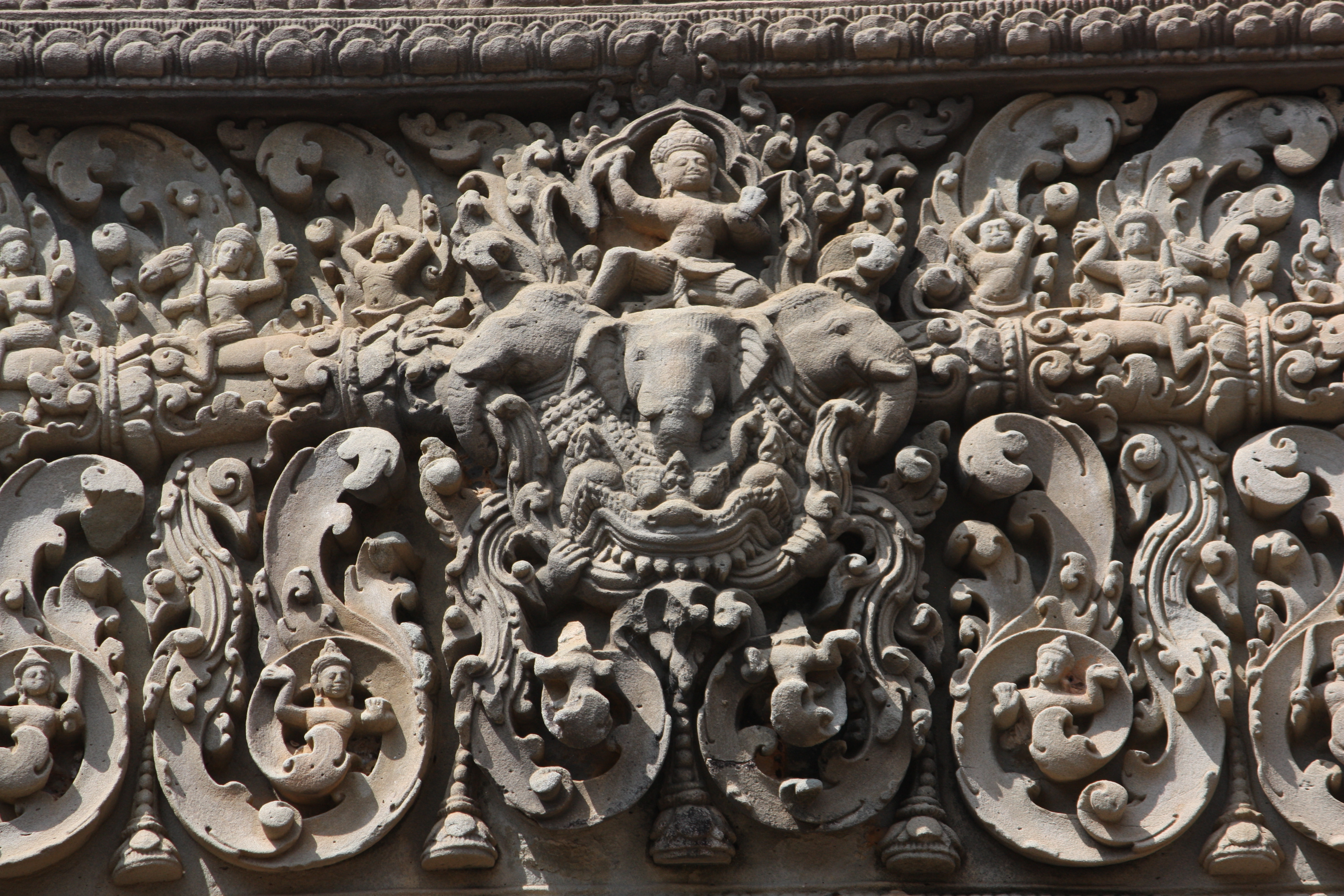
Lintel showing Indra on Airavata

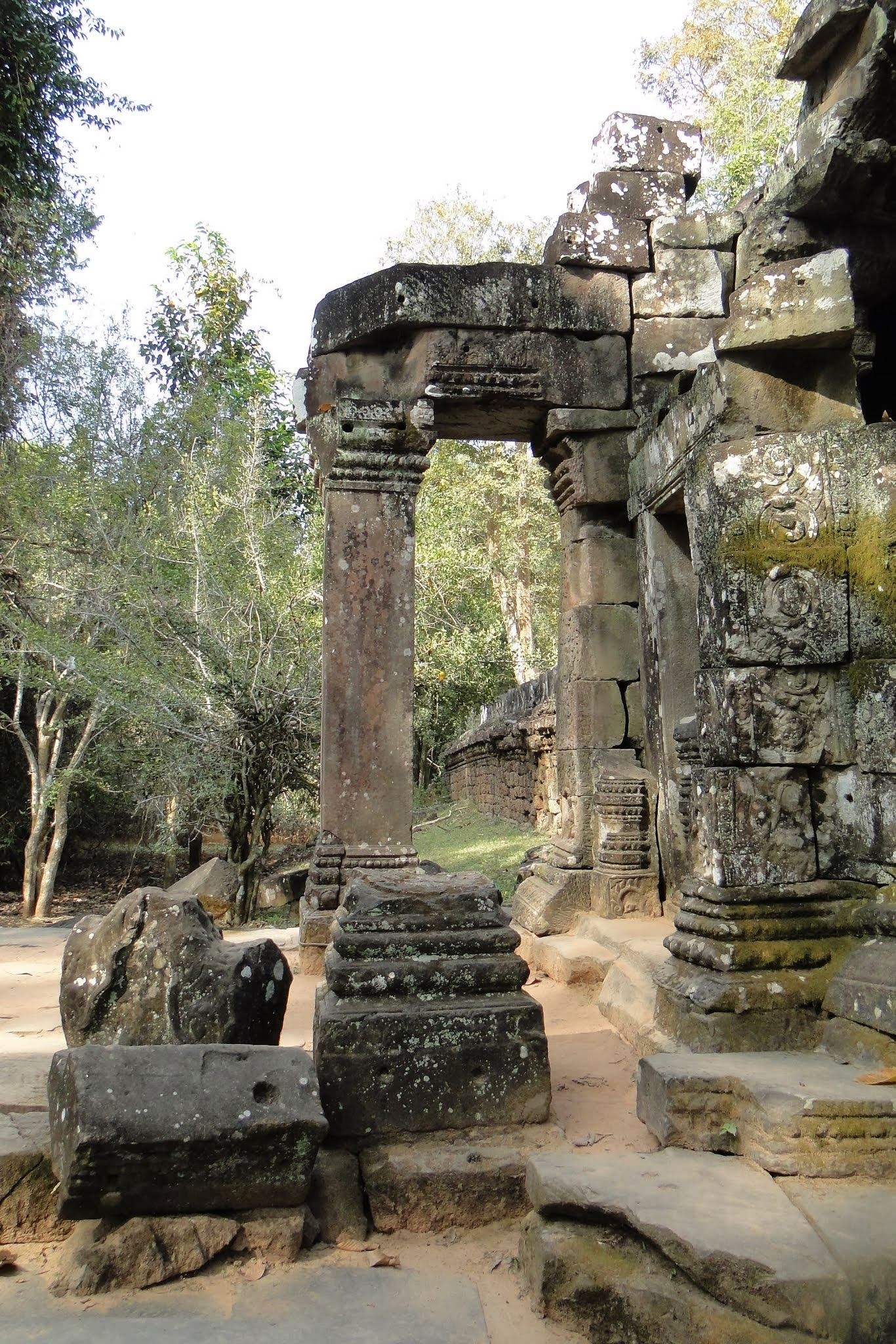
Detail

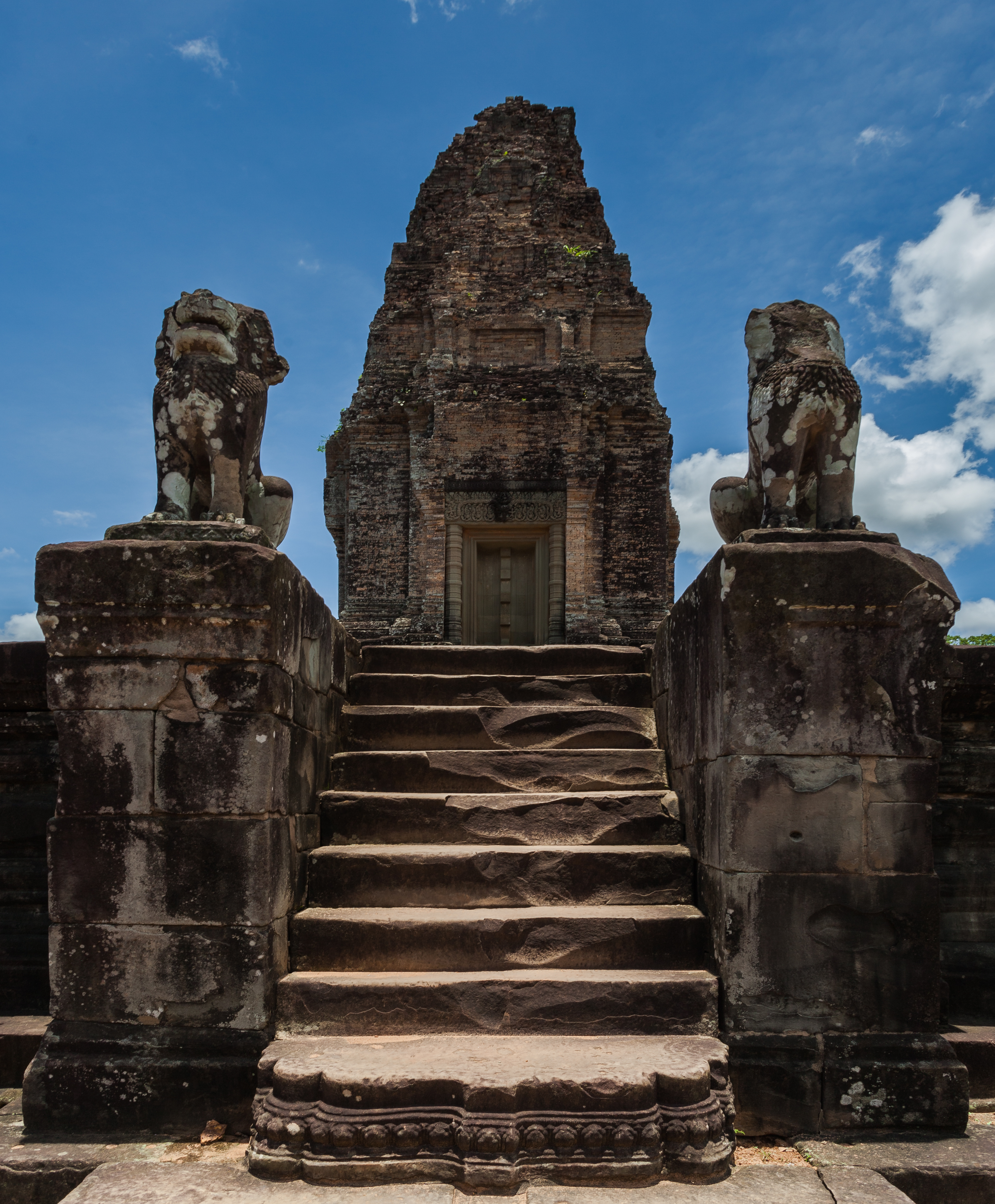
Staircase to upper terrace & Main temple

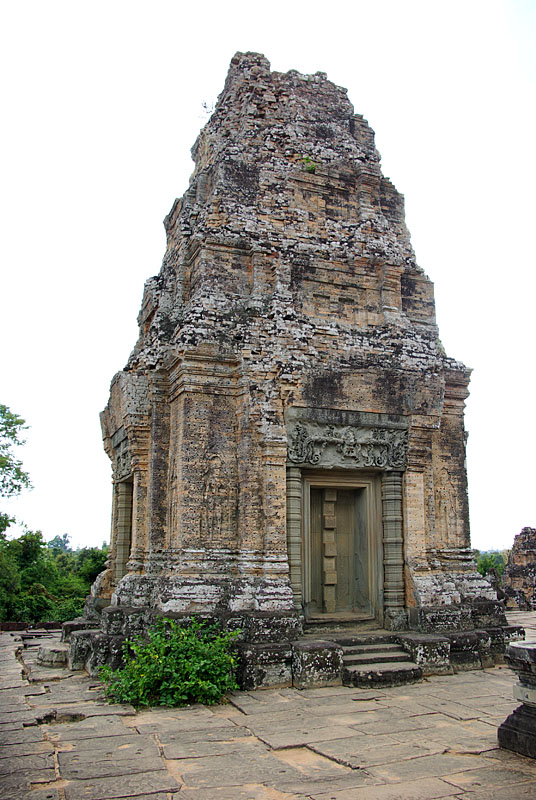
Main temple at the platform centre

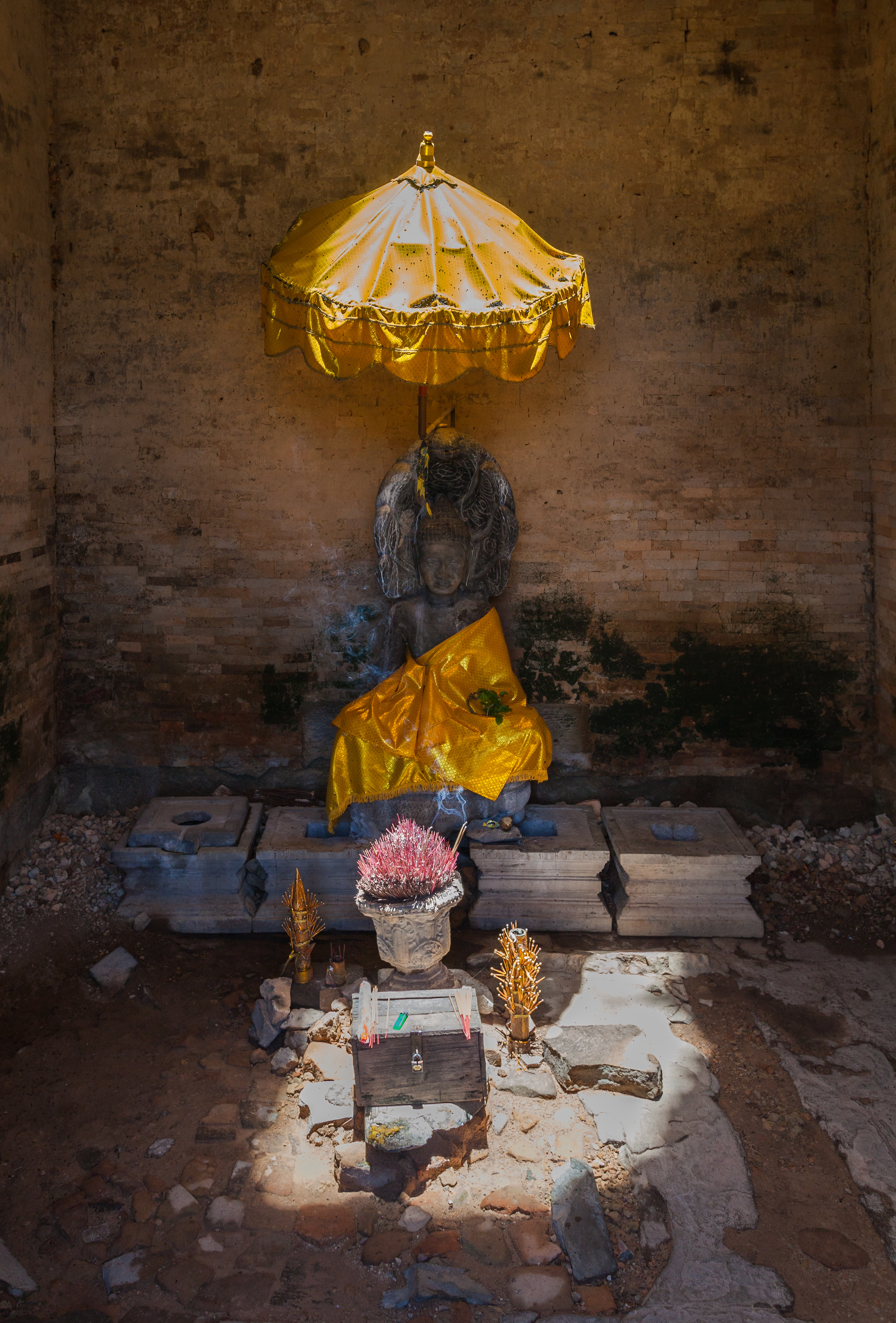
Interior of the temple

== See also ==
- Angkor
- West Mebon
- Architecture of Cambodia
- Pre Rup
