= Pre Rup =

- ប្រាសាទប្រែរូប
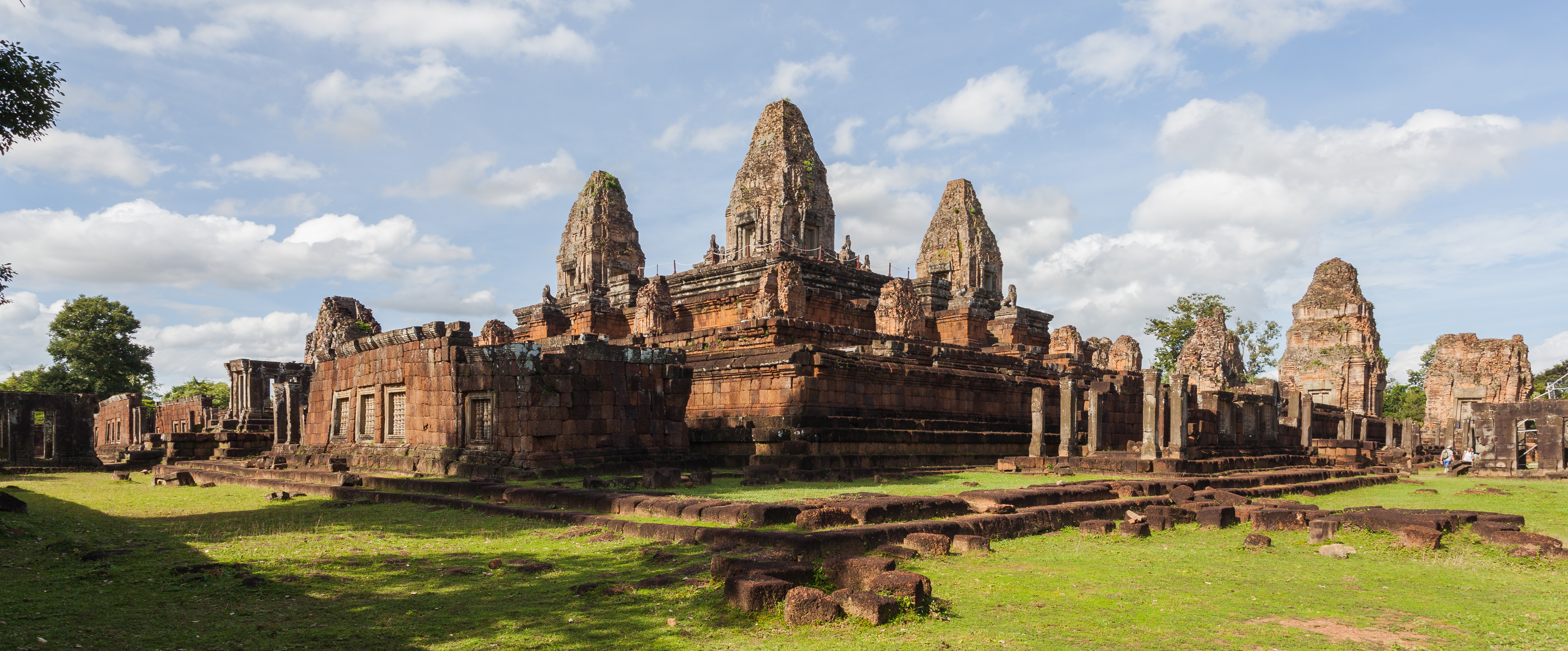

- Location in Cambodia

Religion
- Affiliation: Hinduism
- Deity: Shiva

Location
- Location: Angkor
- Country: Cambodia
- Interactive map of Pre Rup
- Coordinates: 13.435473°N 103.920452°E

Architecture
- Type: Khmer
- Creator: Rajendravarman
- Completed: 961 or 962

Pre Rup (/ˈprɛ ruːp/; Khmer: ប្រែរូប, Prê Rub [prae.ruːp]) is a Hindu temple at Angkor, Cambodia, built as the state temple of Khmer king Rajendravarman and dedicated in 961 or early 962. It is a temple mountain of combined brick, laterite and sandstone construction.

The temple's name is a comparatively modern one meaning "turn the body". This reflects the common belief among Cambodians that funerals were conducted at the temple, with the ashes of the body being ritually rotated in different directions as the service progressed.

== Pre Rup ==
Located just south of the East Baray, or eastern reservoir, Pre Rup is aligned on a north–south axis with the East Mebon temple, which is located on what was an artificial island in the baray. The East Mebon was also a creation of the reign of Rajendravarman. Pre Rup's extensive laterite and brick give it a pleasing reddish tone that is heightened by early morning and late afternoon sunlight. The temple has a square lay-out and two perimeter walls. The outer enclosure is a platform bounded by a laterite wall, 117 meters N-S by 127 meters E-W. A laterite causeway gives entry from the east; unfortunately, a modern road cuts across it. The four external gopuras are cross-shaped, having a central brick section (consisting of three rooms flanked by two independent passageways) and a sandstone vestibule on both sides. To either side inside the eastern gate is a group of three towers aligned north to south. One of the towers appears to have never been built or to have been dismantled later, however they are later additions, probably by Jayavarman V. Further ahead, through another gate, libraries lie to either side of the walkway on the second platform. Just before the entrance there is a stone "cistern", but scholars believe it was a basement for a Nandi bronze statue rather than being used for cremation ceremonies.

There is also a series of long distinct galleries running along each side, a distinctive feature of 10th century architecture that would be substituted by a continuous gallery from Ta Keo onward.

The final squared pyramid, measuring 50 m at its base, rises in three steep tiers a dozen metres in height to a 35 m square platform at the summit. The lowest tier is symmetrically surrounded by 12 small shrines. At the top, five towers are arranged in a quincunx, one at each corner of the square and one in the center. Deities carved as bas-reliefs stand guard at either side of the central tower's eastern door; its other doors are false doors. The southwest tower once contained a statue of Lakshmi, the northwest tower a statue of Uma, the southeast tower a statue of Vishnu and the northeast tower a statue of Shiva. The last one has an inscription on doorjambs that dates from Jayavarman VI and is the only proof of his reign at Angkor.

== History ==
Pre Rup was dedicated to the Hindu god Shiva, and it is probably located on a former shivaite ashram, built by Yasovarman I in the previous century. Perhaps it was standing at the centre of a new capital city built by Rajendravarman, with the southern dike of East Baray as northern city limit, but nothing of the dwellings survived and this "eastern city hypothesis" by Philippe Stern was never confirmed by archeological discoveries.

== Gallery ==
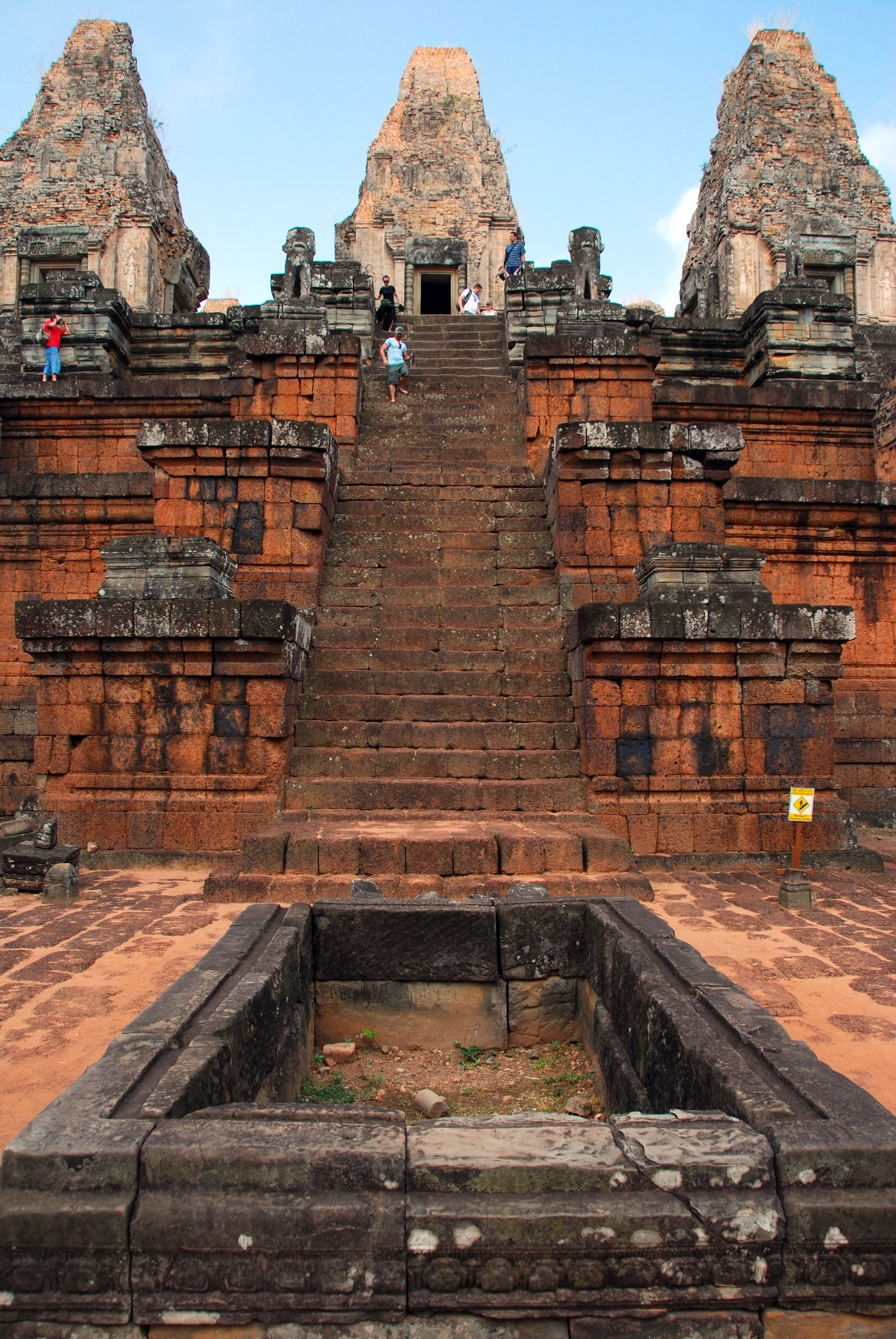
Terminal pyramid of Pre Rup (with the "cistern" foreground)

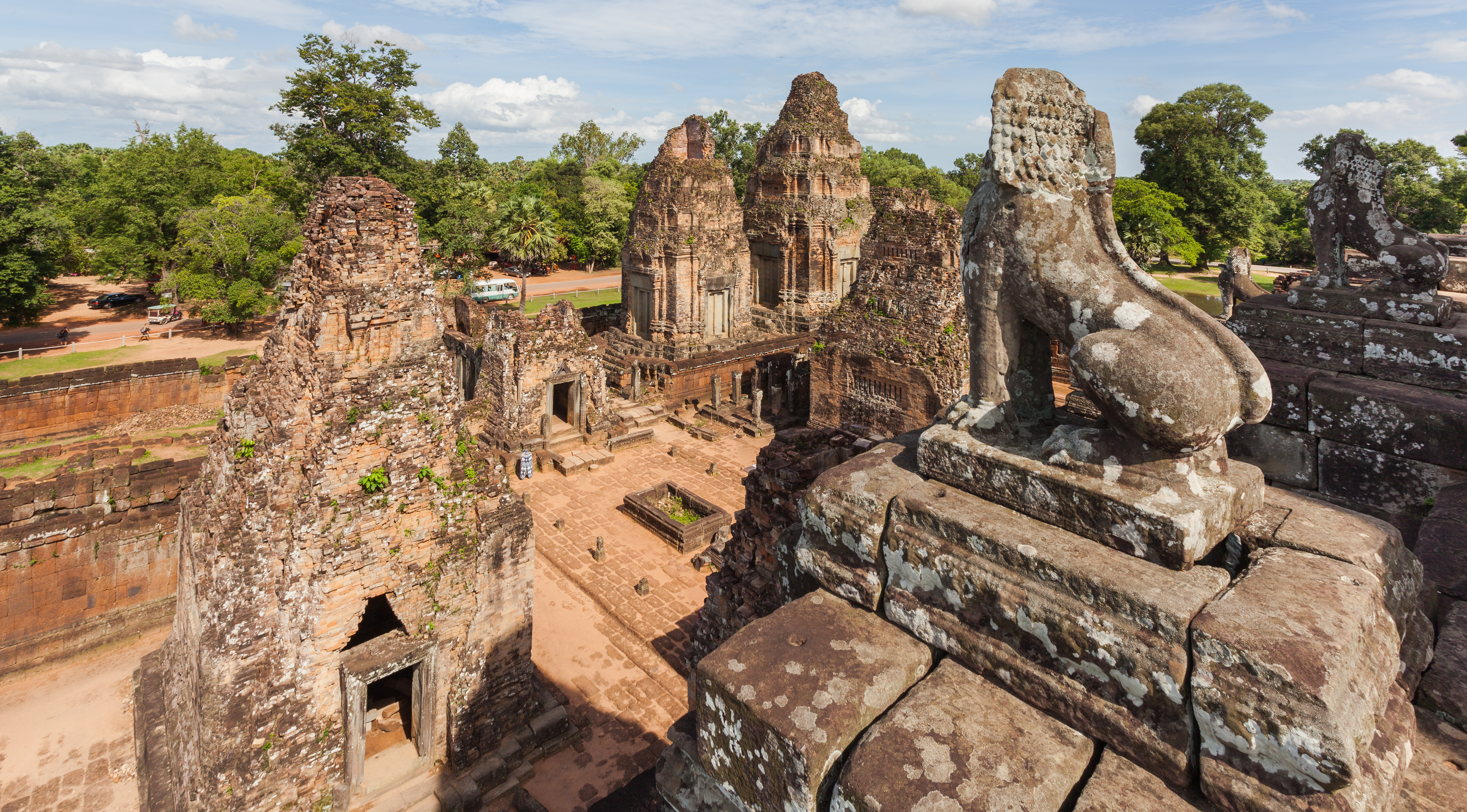
View from the terminal pyramid

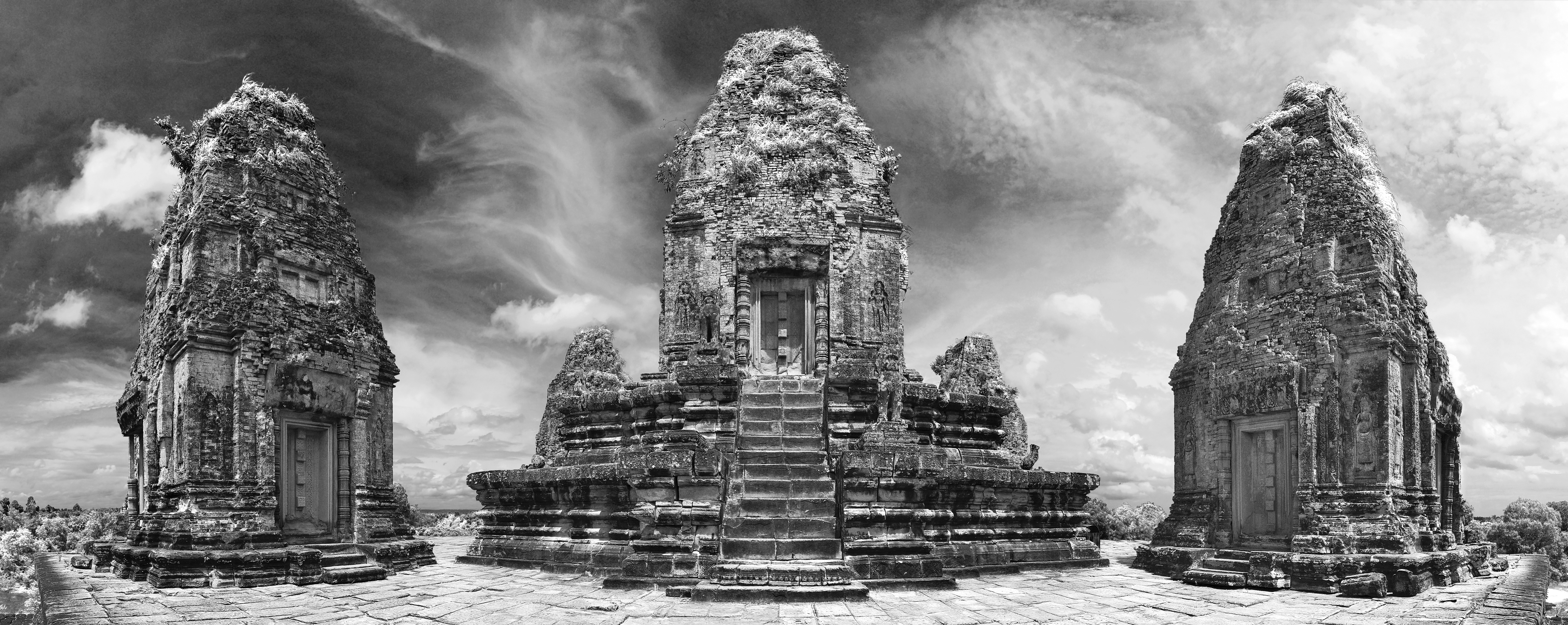
Central prasat with two of the four other prasats visible in front

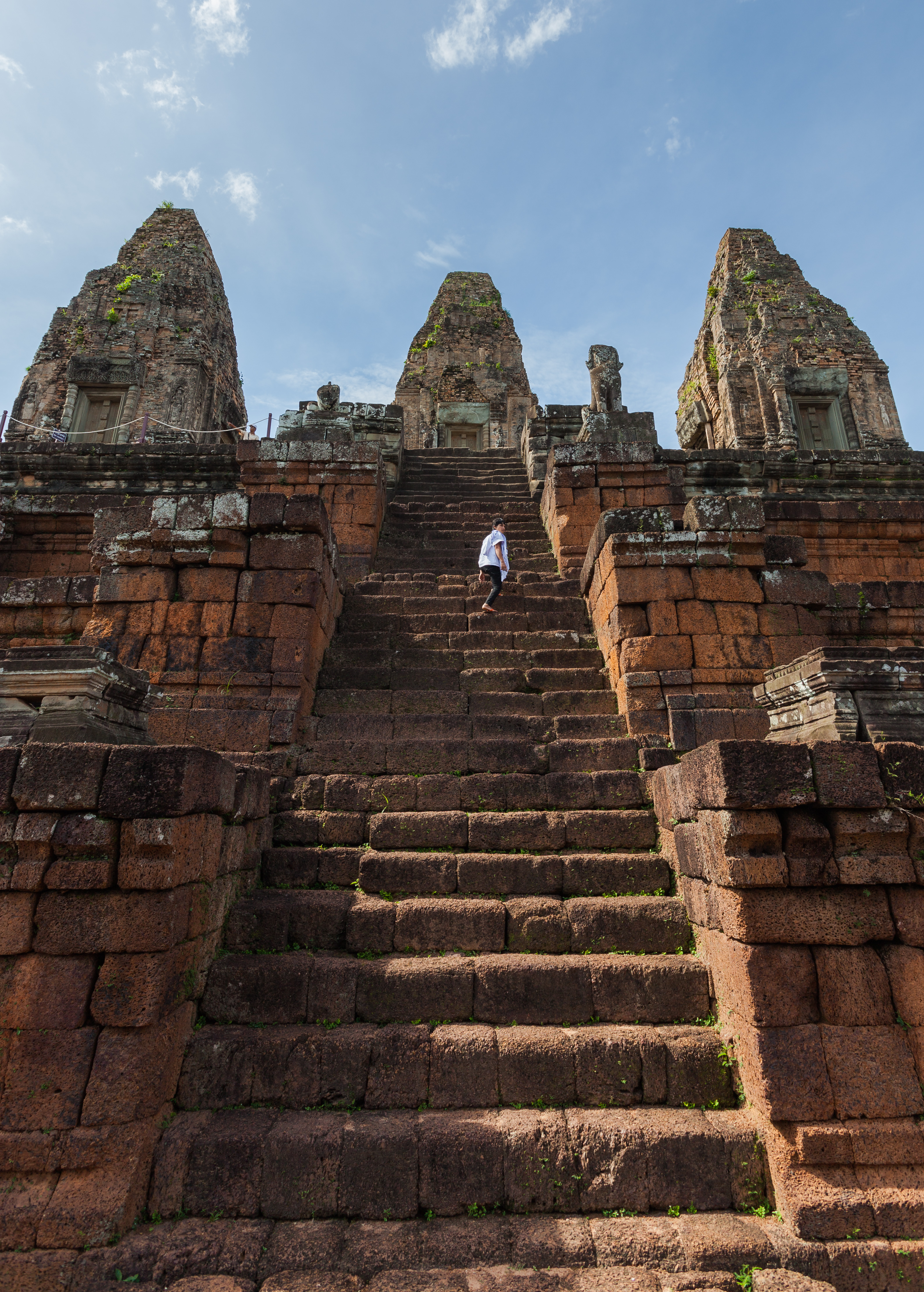
Front view from the bottom

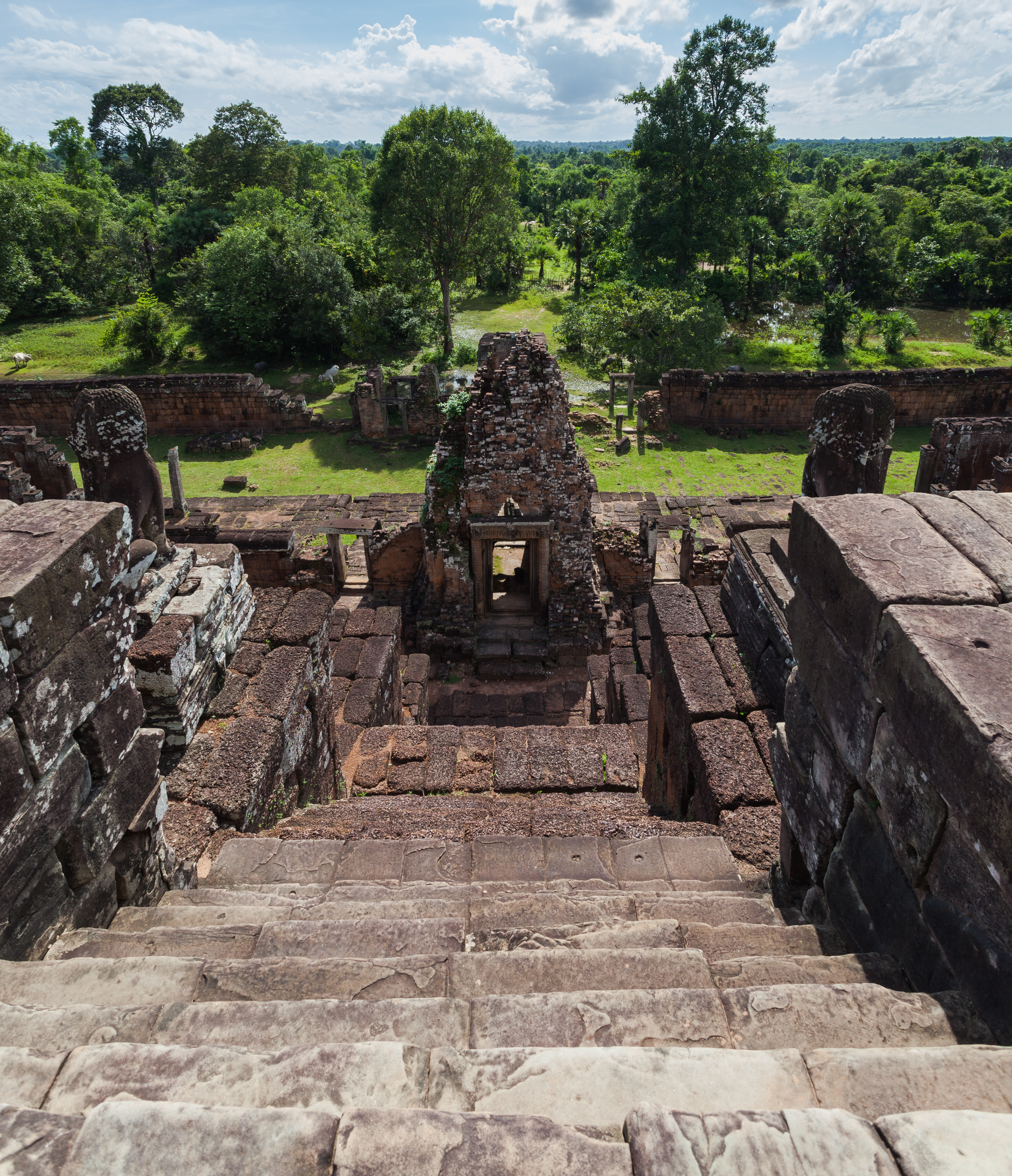
View from the top

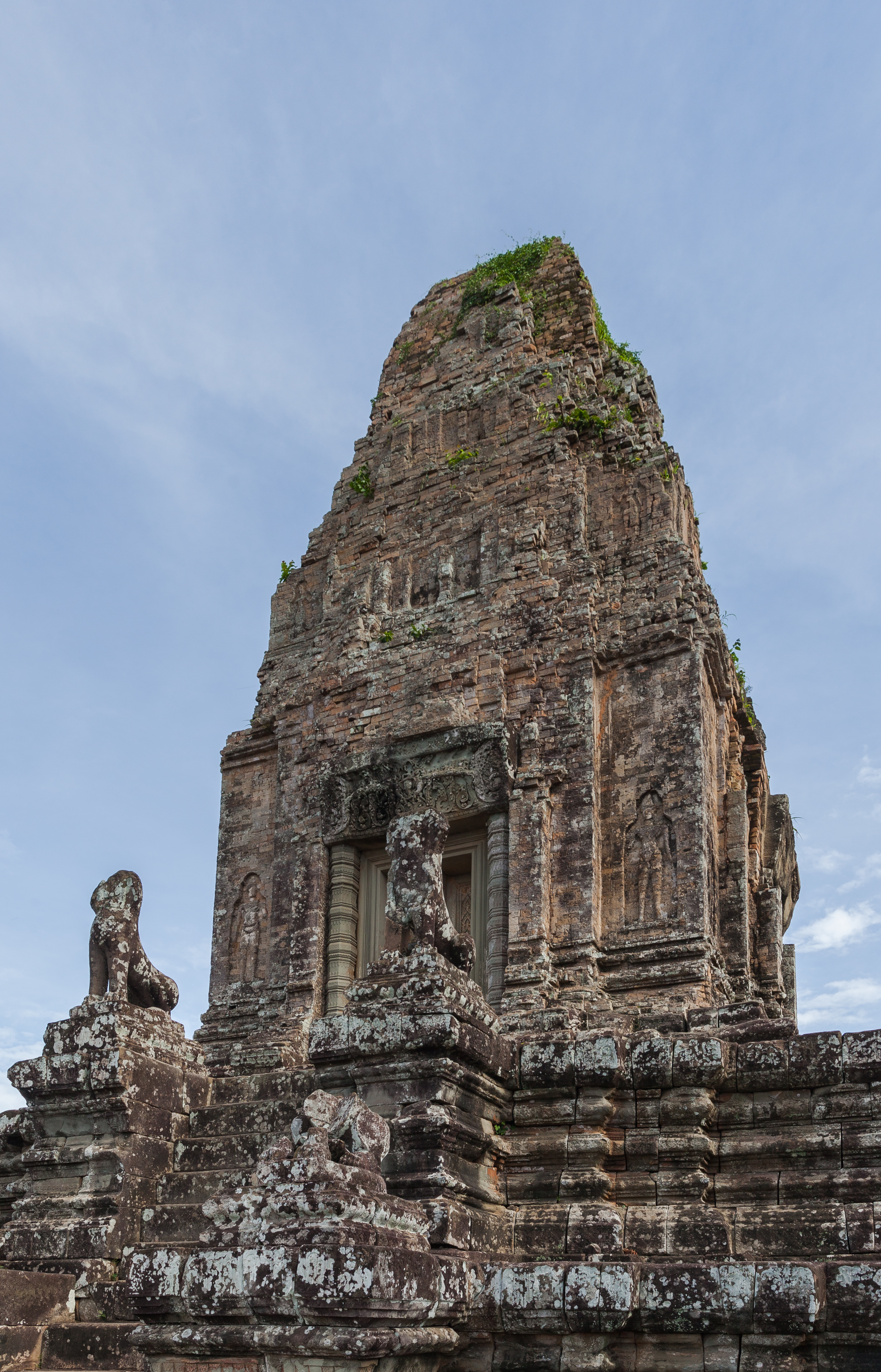
Central tower

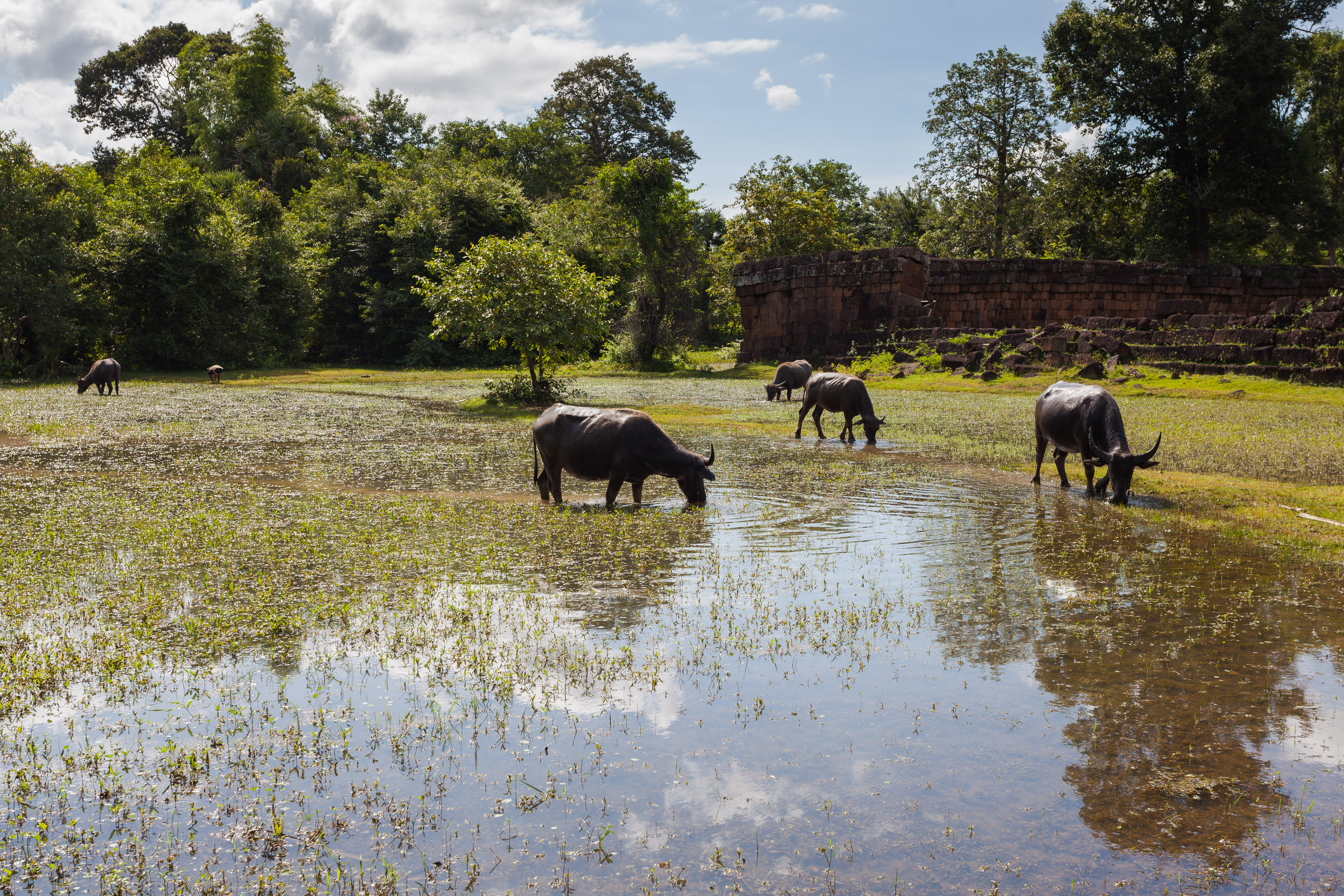
Buffalos at Pre Rup

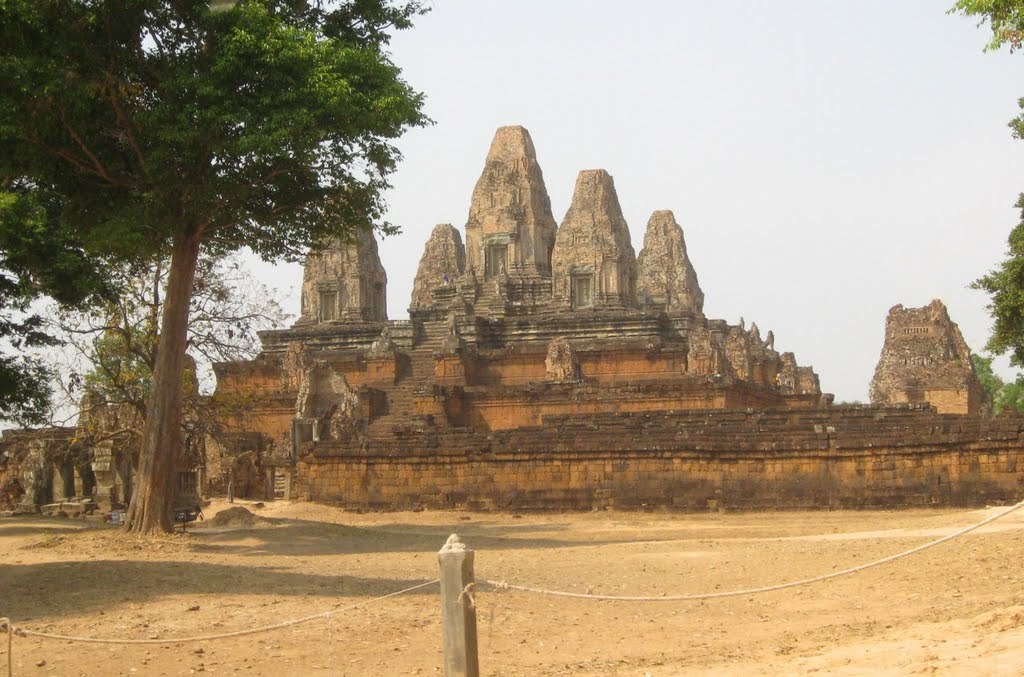
South side of Pre Rup temple
