= Rajendravarman II =

King of Khmer Empire from 944-968 AD

Rajendravarman II រាជេន្ទ្រវរ្ម័នទី២
- King
- Reign: 944–968
- Predecessor: Harshavarman II
- Successor: Jayavarman V
- Died: 968
- Burial: Might be Pre Rup temple
- Spouse: Narendradevi, Prana
- Issue: Jayavarman V
Posthumous name
- Shivaloka
- House: Varman Dynasty
- Father: Yasovarman I
- Religion: Hinduism,Buddhism

Rajendravarman II (Khmer: រាជេន្ទ្រវរ្ម័នទី២) or Rajendravarman the Reformer was the king of the Khmer Empire (region of Angkor in Cambodia), from 944 to 968 AD.

Rajendravarman II was the uncle and first cousin of Harshavarman II. His principal monuments, located in the Angkor region of Cambodia's Siem Reap province, are Pre Rup and East Mebon.

The king claimed links to the royal line of the Chenla state that had its capital at Bhavapura (the city's location is debated) and predates the start of the Khmer empire in 802 AD. Inscriptions say that the Khmer empire under his tutelage extended to southern Vietnam, Laos and much of Thailand and as far north as southern China.

An inscription at Pre Rup relates that Rajendravarman II was a great warrior, his sword frequently blood-stained, his body as hard as a diamond. Though the king punished the guilty, the inscription says, he had an ocean of compassion for the innocent. Other inscriptions depict him as organizer of state religious ritual. In one text, he gives an order for the collection of holy oil, in the form of butter, for use in temples.

The king ruled from a great palace designed by his minister Kavindrarimathana. Many scholars believe that Rajendravarman II instituted a system of centralized administration, establishing more direct control over a collection of princes who had been largely independent at their estates in the provinces.

Construction at Banteay Srei, the ornate temple of pink sandstone located north of the main Angkor complex, began during the king's reign.

Inscriptions from 946 AD say Rajendravarman II had victories over Ramanya and Champa. Historians believe Ramanya was the area of the Mons of Eastern Dvaravati. Rajendravarman II led fighting against the rival state of Champa in the east, and in 946 AD seized as booty a gold statue in the temple of Po Nagar there.

During his reign, the Khmer Empire had 24 cities or pura.

Rajendravarman II was succeeded by his 10-year-old son, who reigned as Jayavarman V.

== Rajendravarman's Achievements ==
After King Rajendravarman led an army to drive the Lavo Thais back in 947 AD, three years later, in 950 AD, he decided to move the capital back to Yasodharapura and built many architectural structures in the area, including the Banteay Srei Temple, Pre Rup Temple, etc. [ 3 ] [ 4 ] in 950 CE, King Rajendravarman fought against the Srivijaya, and took revenge on how they treated his people during the past. After two years of war, the Srivijayan army was weakened. King Rajendravarman besieged and completely captured the capital of Srivijaya, Palembang in 952 CE .

King Rajendravarman then turned on to invade the neigboring Kingdom of Champa, capturing city after city. Rajendravarman also invaded the northern Kingdom of Muang, and captured the Muang capital of Muang Sing in 955 A.D. He strengthened the empire under his rule and the king built forts around the border, and installed solders there.

In the end of his reign he promoted an official named Vamashiva to be his royal guru, and later to be the royal guru of his son and successor, Jayavarman V.

Regnal titles
| Preceded by Harshavarman II | Emperor of Angkor; 944–968 | Succeeded by Jayavarman V |
