= East Baray =

Now-dry baray at Angkor, Cambodia

Coordinates: 13.44756°N 103.921909°E

The East Baray (Khmer: បារាយណ៍ខាងកើត, romanized: Baray Khang Kaoet), or Yashodharatataka, is a now-dry baray, or artificial body of water, at Angkor, Cambodia, oriented east–west and located just east of the walled city Angkor Thom. It was built around the year 900 CE during the reign of King Yasovarman. Fed by the Siem Reap River flowing down from the Kulen Hills, it is the second-largest baray in the Angkor region (after the West Baray) and one of the largest handcut water reservoirs on Earth, measuring roughly 7.2 kilometers by 1.7 km and holding over 36 million cubic meters of water. Stones bearing inscriptions that mark the construction of the baray have been found at all four of its corners. The labour and organization necessary for its construction were staggering: Its dikes contain roughly 8 million cubic meters of fill.

Scholars are divided on the purpose of this and other barays. By some theories, they held water for irrigation, but no inscription has been found mentioning such a function. Other theories say that barays served primarily a symbolic purpose in Khmer religious life, representing the seas of creation that surround Mount Meru, home of the Hindu gods.

The East Baray today contains no water; farmers till crops on its bed. But its outlines remain clearly visible in satellite photographs. In the middle of the baray is the East Mebon temple, located on elevated ground that was an island in the days when the baray contained water.
