= Marschall =

Marschall is a German surname. Notable people with the surname include:

- Adolf Marschall von Bieberstein (1842–1912), German politician and Secretary of State of the Foreign Office of the German Empire
- Friedrich August Marschall von Bieberstein (1768–1826), early explorer of the flora and archaeology of south Imperial Russia
- Georg Marschall von Ebnet (died 1505), the Prince-Bishop of Bamberg from 1503 to 1505
- Christoph von Marschall (born 1959), German journalist working in the United States for the daily Berlin newspaper Der Tagesspiegel
- Elisabeth Marschall (1886–1947), Head Nurse (Oberschwester) at the Ravensbrück concentration camp executed for war crimes
- Ferenc Marschall (1887–1970), Hungarian politician, who served as Minister of Agriculture for two months in 1938
- Ken Marschall (born 1950), American painter and illustrator notable for his paintings of famous ocean liners
- Matern von Marschall (born 1962), German politician
- Nicola Marschall (1829–1917), German-American artist who supported the Confederate cause during the American Civil War
- Olaf Marschall (born 1966), German retired footballer and a football sports manager
- Philipp Marschall (born 1988), German cross country skier who has competed since 2005
- Rick Marschall (born 1949), writer/editor and comic strip historian, described as "America's foremost authority on pop culture"
- Rudolf Marschall (1873–1967), Austrian sculptor and medalist, born in Vienna
- Wilhelm Marschall (1886–1976), German admiral during World War II
- Albrecht Marschall von Rapperswil, one of the Minnesingers featured in the Codex Manesse

== See also ==
- Marschall der DDR, the highest rank in the National People's Army of the former German Democratic Republic, never held and abolished in 1989
- Marschall v Land Nordrhein Westfalen (1997), a German and EU labour law case concerning positive action
- Hofmarschall
- Marchal
- Marsal (disambiguation)
- Marshal
- Marshall (disambiguation)
