= Preah Palilay =

- Prasat Preah Palilay
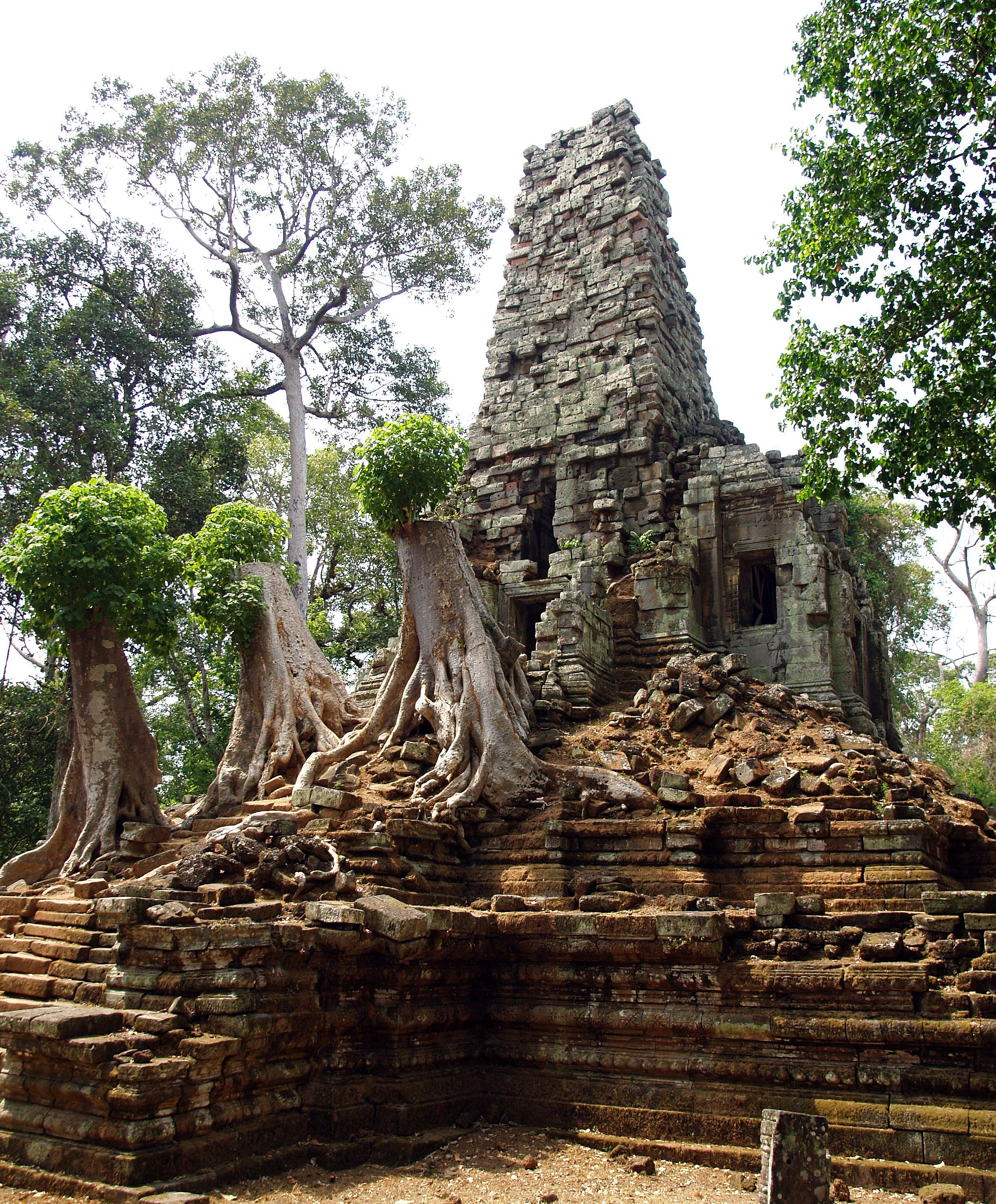
- Chimney-like tower of the central sanctuary

- Location in Cambodia

Religion
- Affiliation: Buddhism other_info =: Sect: [[{{{sect}}}]]
- Province: Siem Reap

Location
- Location: Angkor Thom
- Country: Cambodia
- Interactive map of Preah Palilay
- Coordinates: 13°26′56″N 103°51′18″E

Architecture
- Type: Khmer, (Post Bayon style)
- Creator: Perhaps Jayavarman VIII or later
- Completed: 13th or 14th century

Preah Palilay (Khmer: ប្រាសាទព្រះបាលិលេយ្យ, Prasat Preăh Palĭlai [praːsaːt prĕəh paːlilaj]) is a Buddhist temple at Angkor, Cambodia. It is located in Angkor Thom, 400 m north-west of Phimeanakas. This small Buddhist sanctuary in the wooded area north of the Royal palace in Angkor Thom has a number of attractive features and is well worth the short detour.

== History ==
The Buddhist elements and lacking of foundation stele or inscriptions make somewhat difficult dating this temple. It is generally ascribed to Jayavarman VIII reign, but it seems difficult to explain how the Buddhist imagery could have survived from the iconoclast fury of that epoch. Maybe it was built in different periods: the sanctuary in the first half of 12th century, while the gopura in the late 13th or early 14th century. Chinese art historian William Willetts (1918–1995) believed that it dated from the time of Suryavarman II (1113–1149). The temple was cleaned by Henri Marchal in 1918–19, while the gopura was restored by anastylosis by Maurice Glaize in 1937–38.

== Description ==
The temple has a cross-shaped terrace, 8.5 m by 30 m long, with seven-headed nāga balustrades in good conditions, on the east, guarded by two decapitated dvarapalas and a lion (of an original two). A 33 m-long causeway connects it to the single sandstone gopura. Before the laterite enclosure 50 m square there is a shrine with a 3 m tall statue of Buddha, sitting on a lotus, of a later period.

The gopura has three entrances, the east-facing pediment of the northern one shows "the offering of the animals in the forest of Parilyyaka", where the Buddha retreated after leaving Kosambi. It seems that the origin of Pralilay could have been the alteration of the name Parilyyaka. Other pediments show other scenes from the life of the Buddha including Sujata's offering of rice-milk to the Buddha-to-be, and the subjugation of the elephant Nalagiri.

The sandstone sanctuary stands on a three-tiered basement, 6 m high in overall. It has a 5 m square central chamber that opens to the four cardinal points with as many vestibules. Their classical ornamentations, unfortunately ruined, suggest that the sanctuary belongs to the first half of the 12th century and is older than the gopura. Even the characteristic "chimney-like" tower that stands above seems to be a later addition (Willetts identifying it as belonging to Jayavarman VII's period), maybe a frame for a covering.

Some parts of the pediments have been taken away for safe-keeping, others are lying on the ground. The visible parts show Indra on his mount, the elephant Airavata, and the assault of the demoniac army of Mara.

At the present time there is a little Buddhist monastery near the temple and the presence of the monks in its area is not uncommon.

== Gallery ==
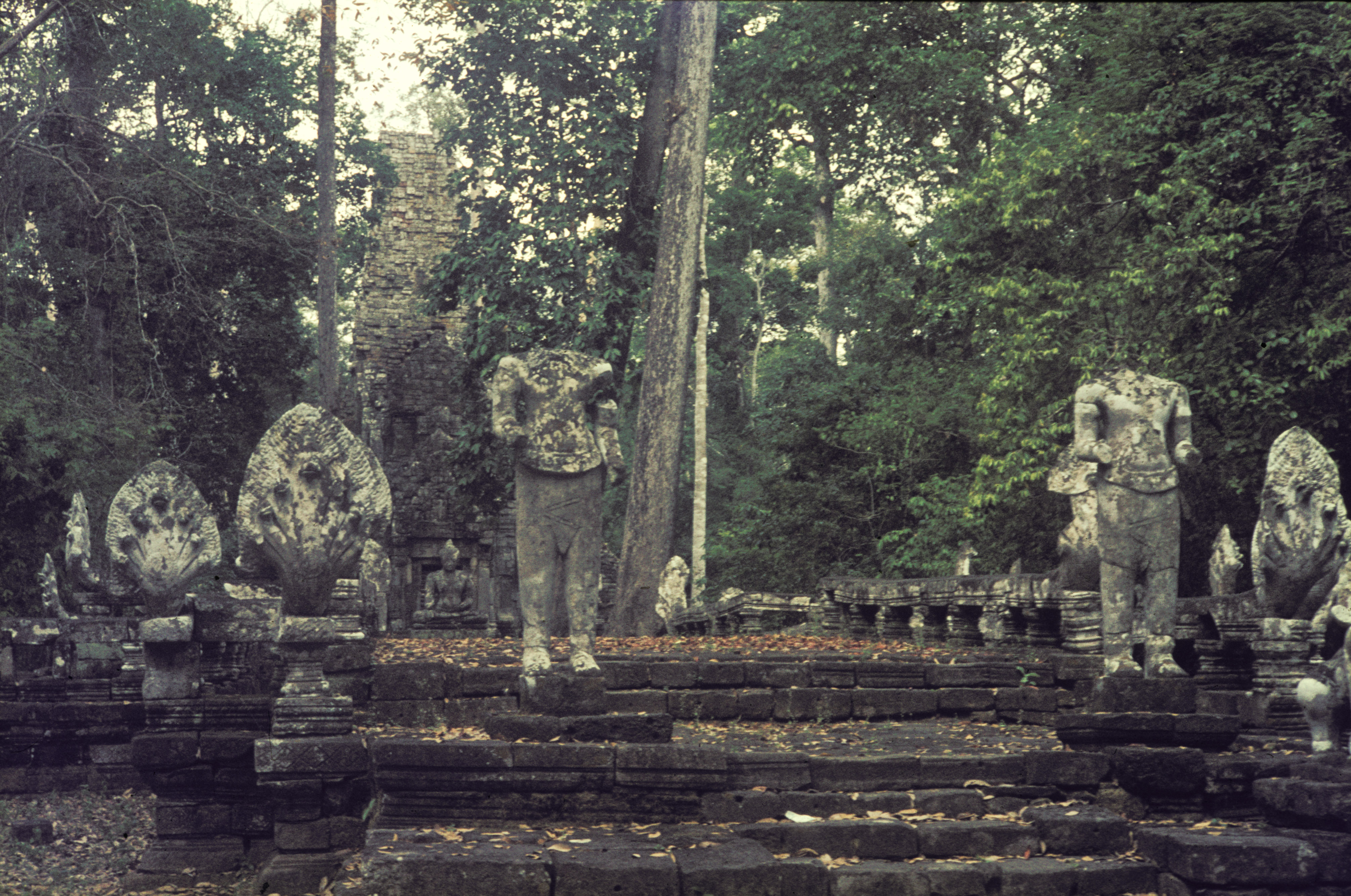
East entrance of the temple in 1960s

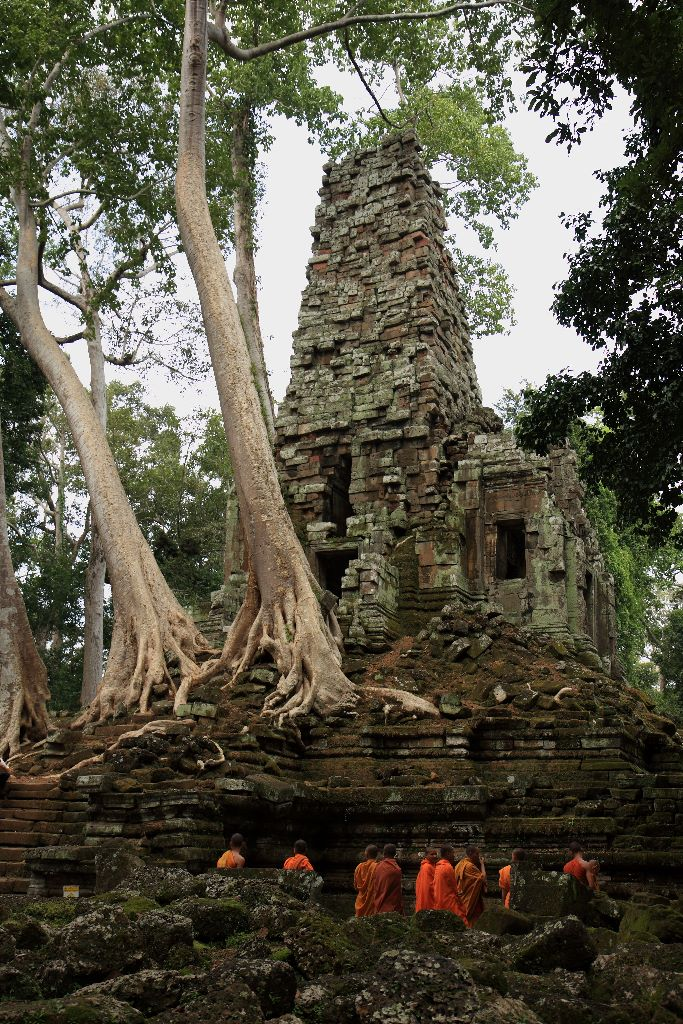
Monks from the nearby monastery in front of the temple

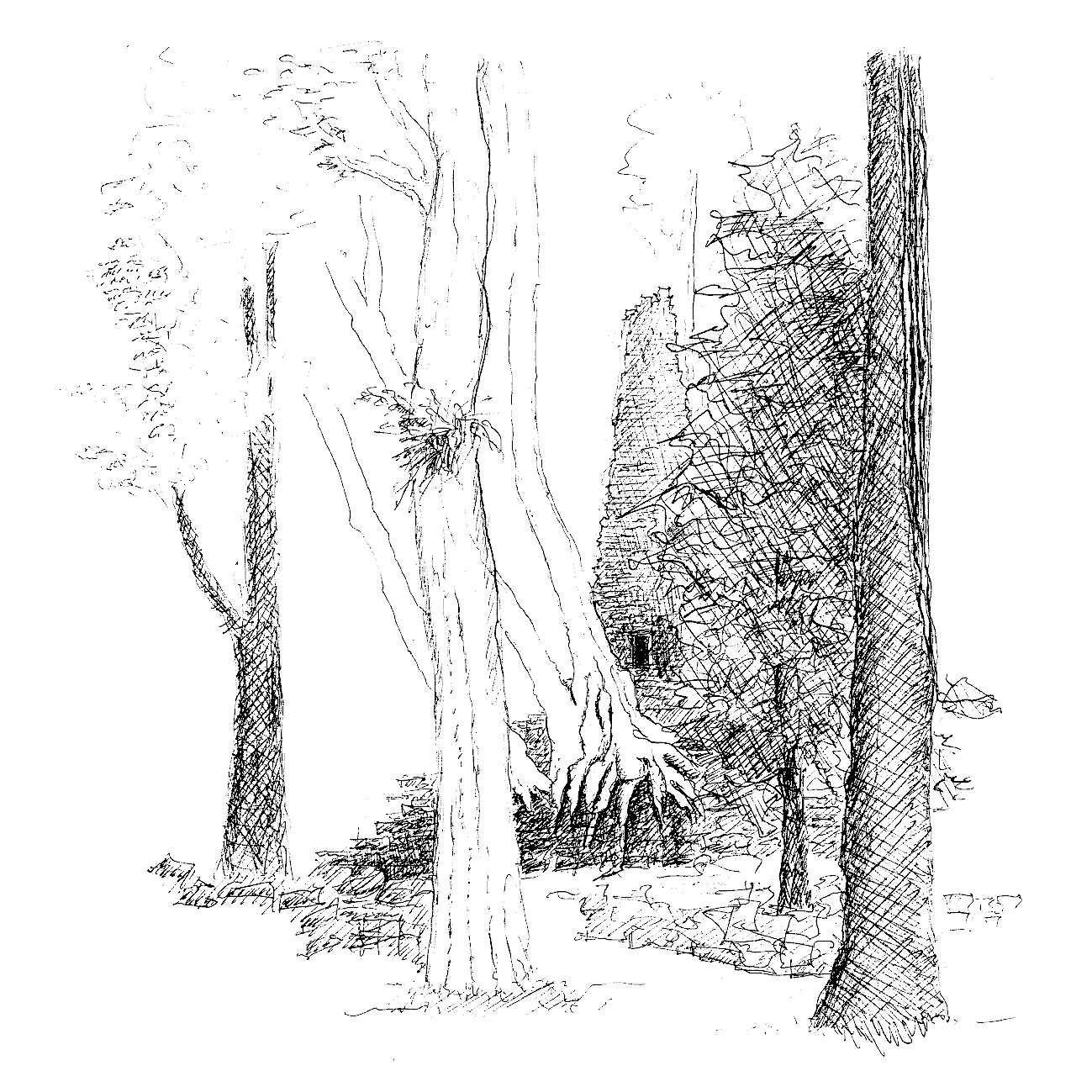
Picturesque trees in front of the chimney-like tower

== See also ==
- Prasat Suor Prat
- Preah Pithu
- Tep Pranam
- Terrace of the Elephants
- Terrace of the Leper King

== Bibliography ==
- Freeman, Michael; Jacques, Claude (2006). Ancient Angkor. River Books. ISBN 974-8225-27-5.
- Marchal, Henri (1922). "Le temple de Prah Palilay". BEFEO (in French). 22 (1): 101–134. doi:10.3406/befeo.1922.2913. ISSN 0336-1519.
- Glaize, Maurice (2003) [1993, First published 1944]. Tremmel, Nils (ed.). The Monuments of the Angkor Group (PDF) (based on the 4th ed.).
