= Marchal =

Marchal is a French surname. Notable people with the surname include:

- André Marchal (1894–1980), French organist and teacher
- Arlette Marchal (1902–1984), French film actress
- Élie Marchal (1839–1923), Belgian botanist and mycologist
- Henri Marchal (1876–1970), French archaeologist
- Georges Marchal (1920–1997), French actor
- Gilles Marchal (1944–2013), French songwriter and singer
- Jules Marchal (1924–2003), Belgian diplomat and historian
- Luc Marchal (born 1943), Belgian military officer
- Marcel Marchal (1913–1993), French footballer
- Maurice Marchal (another name for Morvan Marchal, below)
- Morvan Marchal (1900–1963), Breton-French architect and nationalist
- Olivier Marchal (born 1958), French film director
- Sylvain Marchal (born 1980), French footballer
- Thibault Marchal (born 1986), French footballer

== See also ==
- Marchal, Granada, municipality in Granada, Spain.
