= Marsal =

Marsal may refer to the following articles:

- Marshal of the Russian Federation, the top rank (OF-10) in the Russian Federation's armed forces
- Marshal of the Soviet Union, the top rank (OF-10) in the Soviet Union's armed forces
- Chief marshal of the branch, an OF9-rank in the Soviet Union's armed forces
- Marshal of the branch, an OF9-rank in the Soviet Union's armed forces
- Maršal (disambiguation), the top rank of Yugoslav armed forces and a film
- Generalfeldmaschall, the top rank (OF-10) in German-speaking armed forces
- Marsal, Moselle, a commune in France
- Marsal, Tarn, a commune in France
