= Maurice Glaize =

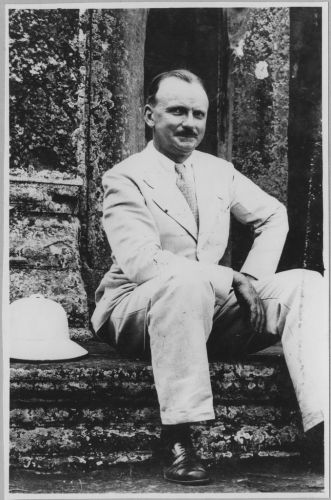
Maurice Glaize

Maurice Glaize (26 December 1886 – 17 July 1964) was a French architect and archeologist, Conservator of Angkor from 1937 to 1945.

== Early years: education, wedding, war and professional experiences ==
Born to a family of artists in Paris (his father was an architect and his grandfather was Auguste-Barthélemy Glaize), he attended at École nationale supérieure des Beaux-Arts, learning under the architect Henri Deglane. In 1913 he put in for the École française d'Extrême-Orient (EFEO), but ranked second behind Georges Demasur. On 3 January 1914 he married Louise Carlier, who gave him four sons and was a devoted mate. He served during World War I in a balloon unit, and then finally on 11 June 1919 he achieved the qualification of architect dplg.

He lived in Paris several years, working mostly as freelance architect, but never losing his interest in Indochina. Thanks to his cousin, François Glaize, he was recruited by the Crédit foncier et de l'Union immobilière d'Indochine and worked as architect and agency manager at Phnom Penh from 1928 to 1930 (participating into the building of the Royal Palace), then as architect-in-chief at Saigon from 1931 to 1934.

== Conservator of Angkor ==
His contract wasn't renewed at the end of 1934 due to world economic crisis so, while on leave in France, when he became acquainted with the tragic death of Georges Alexandre Trouvé he put in for open position. His candidacy was formally accepted and after a temporary contract with Crédit foncier de l'Ouest africain at Dakar, he embarked for Saigon at Marseille with his wife and two children on 2 October 1936. He was appointed permanent member of EFEO on 1 December 1936 and "Conservator of Angkor" in following year.

He initially accepted a relatively poor wage from government, considering his qualifications and the present state of his family, and encountered some difficulties dealing with colonial administration. Besides that it was only some years later, thanks to general governor Catroux, that restoration funds raised to a notable level.

== Field work ==
In spite of such economical restrictions, his work was surely impressive and involved many buildings, not only at Ankgor. Sometimes his intervention was limited and consisted in excavation and consolidation, as for East Mebon (1937-1939), Phnom Krom (1938) and Phnom Bok (1939). For other buildings he used partially anastylosis, as in Neak Pean (1938-1939), Preah Khan, Bayon (between 1939 and 1946) and the North Gate of Angkor Thom, but in particular cases he opted for deeper or larger interventions, as in Preah Palilay (1938-1938), Bakong (1936-1944), Banteay Samré (1936-1946) and West Mebon (1943-1944). The extent of his work led George Coedès to assert that Maurice Glaize's name will remain bound to the resurrection of the Khmer capital city of Angkor.

He also made several notable findings, like sculptures and foundation steles (e.g. the stele of Preah Khan), and some critical analysis of methodologies of restoration of Khmer monuments (see Glaize, 1941 and 1946). In 1944 he was the third conservator of Angkor (after Henri Parmentier and Henri Marchal) who published a guide of Angkor, entitled Les Monuments du groupe d'Angkor, which is still now a reference text for visitors and is available freely in English on The Angokor Guide.

== Last years ==
In 1946 the majority of French scholars left Indochina. After an extended leave, Maurice Glaize renounced to come back to Cambodia and settled in La Rochelle, where he participated in restoration works of the city. After having had health problems for several years, on 17 July 1964 he died of cerebral haemorrhage in La Rochelle during sleep.

== Maurice Glaize's inheritance ==
After Henri Marchal, who introduced anastylosis in Angkor, Maurice Glaize succeeded in adapting that method to available resources, value and structural conditions of each building. His work led to a better understanding of the role of architectural representations in Khmer civilization (Neak Pean, West Mebon). With Maurice Glaize restoration work and architectural research fed mutually, this became a primary principle in the following interventions of the EFEO in Cambodia.

== Quotations ==
Gradually the chaos becomes ordered, and one perceives the profusion of towers as being made from a combination of elements grouped at the centre in a sort of bunched sheaf.

It's no longer the building that matters, but only its symbolism.

– Maurice Glaize, speaking about Bayon, in A Guide to the Angkor Monuments

== Selected works (in French) ==
- 1940 - Essai sur la connaissance de Nâk Pân après anastylose on persee.fr, Le gopura de Práh Pàlilai on persee.fr, Le dégagement du Phnom Krom, précédé de quelques remarques sur les fondations de Yaçovarman on persee.fr, BEFEO 40/2, pp. 351–362, pp. 363–370, pp. 371–383
- 1941 - L'anastylose, méthode de reconstruction des monuments anciens, son application à l'art khmer, Cahiers de l'EFEO, 29, pp. 25–32
- 1944 - À Angkor. Fouilles et Trouvailles à Bakong, Indochine (Hanoi), 187, pp. 18–19
- 1944 - Les monuments du groupe d'Angkor, A. Portail (Paris), (2nd ed.1948, 3rd ed.1963, 4th ed.1993)

== Bibliography ==
- (in French) Louis Malleret (1967). "Nécrologie: Maurice Glaize (1886-1964)". BEFEO (in French). 53 (2): 311–330. ISSN 0336-1519.
- (in French) Maurice Glaize's biography on EFEO web site
