= Preah Pithu =

- Prasat Preah Pithu
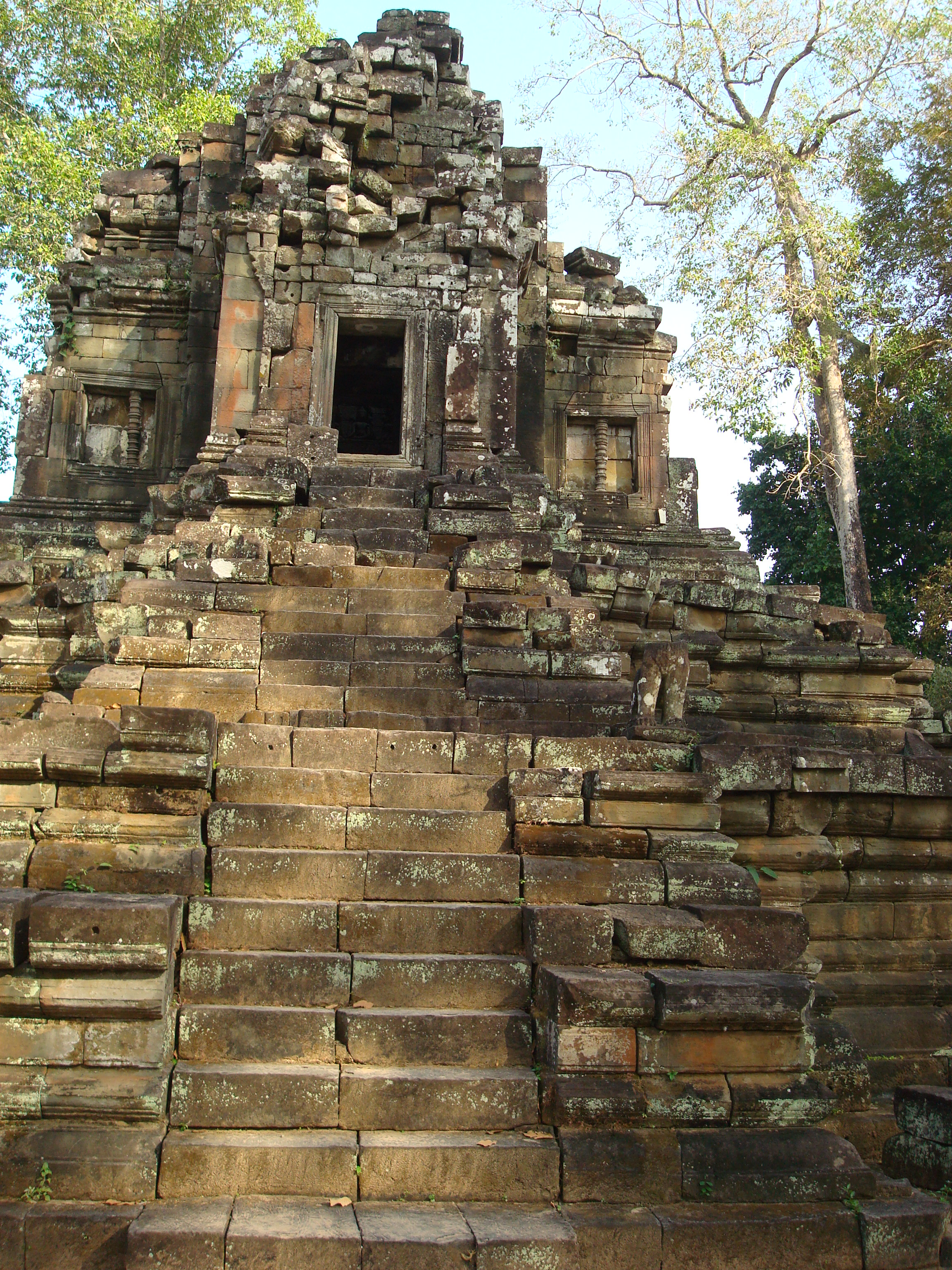
- Temple X of Preah Pithu

- Location in Cambodia

Religion
- Affiliation: Buddhism and Hinduism other_info =: Sect: [[{{{sect}}}]]
- Province: Siem Reap

Location
- Location: Angkor Thom
- Country: Cambodia
- Interactive map of Preah Pithu
- Coordinates: 13°26′56″N 103°51′41″E

Architecture
- Type: Khmer (Angkor Wat style modified to post-Bayon style)
- Creator: Suryavarman II, Jayavarman VIII
- Completed: 12th to 13th century
- Temple: 5

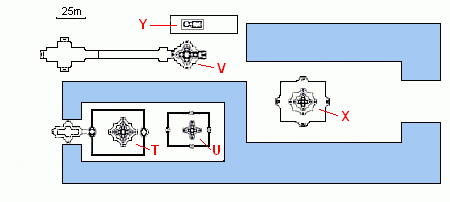
Plan of Preah Pithu temples

Preah Pithu (Khmer: ប្រាសាទព្រះពិធូរ, Prasat Preăh Pĭthu [praːsaːt prĕəh pi tʰuː]) is a group of five temples at Angkor, Cambodia. In fact they were in all probability not designed as a group. Despite their ruined state, the remains have good decorative carving and their semi-wooded setting is attractive and peaceful.

== The site ==
The temples are located in Angkor Thom, north-east of the Bayon, in front of Tep Pranam. The temples are near but they weren't built in the same period, except for two of them, so there is no apparent order. They're identified by letters: T, U, V, W and X. "X" is a Buddhist temple, it remained unfinished and is probably the latest. The others are Hindu. The five temples are in bad conditions, upper levels are ruined, but their carvings are interesting and the site is rather peaceful, wooded and scarcely crowded. A moat, often dry, surrounds some of the temples. They were cleaned first by Jean Commaille in 1908, then by Henri Marchal from 1918 to 1920.

=== Temples "T" and "U" ===
They were built together quite for sure, as they are on the same W-E axis and are surrounded by a single moat. They're oriented to the west, having a cruciform terrace on two levels with nāgas balustrades as entrance. The temple "T" has a sandstone enclosure, which measures 45 by 40 meters, and has two gopuras on the main W-E axis. The sanctuary, on a 3-levels ornated platform 6 meters high, has a chamber which sheltered a large linga on its pedestal. The fragments of the lintel of western door, on the ground, show a stylized depiction of the "Churning of the Sea of Milk", while the walls are decorated with devatas and floral motifs, Bayon style. The temple "U" is similar to "T", but smaller and simpler. Its enclosure is 35 by 28 meters. It has no gopura. The lintel of west door shows the Trimurti, with Shiva dancing on a kala-head between Vishnu and Brahma. The internal walls are sculpted with dvarapalas and the blind arches at the base of pillars are typical of Angkor Wat period. On the northern lintel there is another depiction of the "Churning of the Sea of Milk".

=== Temple "X" ===
Temple "X" stands on a large terrace, 4 meters high, about 100 meters east of temple "U". It is straight reachable from there if the moat is dry. It is similar in design to the former temples but is larger and incomplete in its decorations. "X" is a buddhist temple: on the walls of the sanctuary chamber there is a double row of sculpted Buddhas. Even the lintels show buddhist motifs. However the most interesting remains, depicting famous Siddharta's cutting of the hair, are not in place. Towards the east, the laterite terrace is surrounded by semas, delimiting the sacred area.

=== Temple "V" ===
Outside the residual moat, north of temple "U", there is temple "V". It is oriented to the East, where it opens with a double vestibule, and has no enclosure. On the West it has a causeway which ends with a 40 meter long cruciform terrace, leading into NE corner of the Royal Square. Its sanctuary chamber, standing on two-tier sculpted basement, is the largest of the group, having a square side of 3.80 m, and hosting a large 1.5 m linga. Its external decorations, in Angkor Wat style, are incomplete.

=== Temple "Y" ===
Temple "Y" has no basement or stairways and stands on an earthen platform, north of "V". It was dated between Angkor Wat and Bayon. Oriented to the East, it has a long mandapa as entrance, linked by a vestibule to a 3.5 m by 3.0 m sanctuary chamber, which hosted a linga 0.95 m tall. The larger chamber has mostly collapsed, but on its western side there are two remarkable half-frontons, which depict the defeat of the asura Bana by Krishna to the north and the three giant steps of Vamana to the south.

== Gallery ==
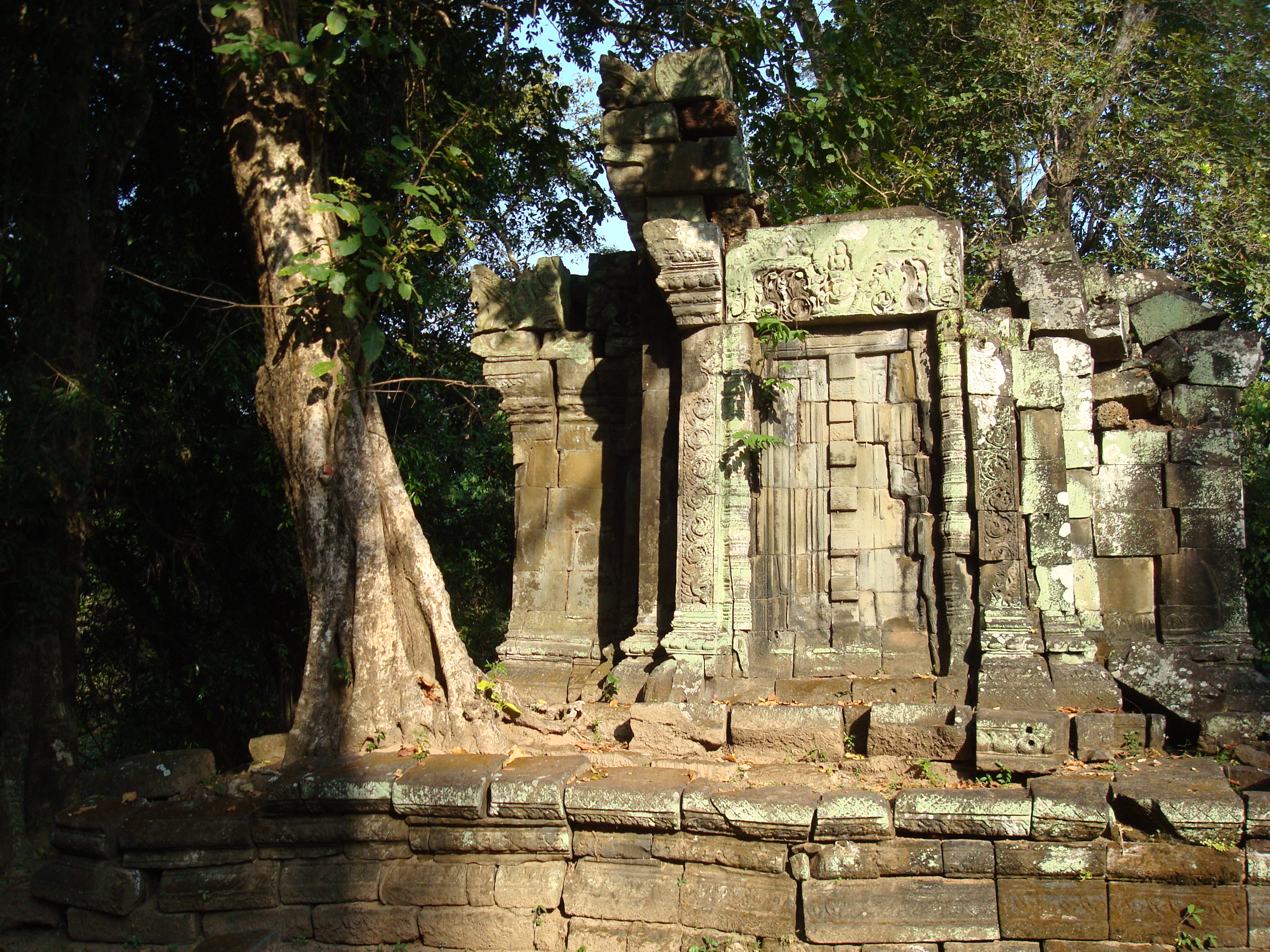
Western closure temple "Y"

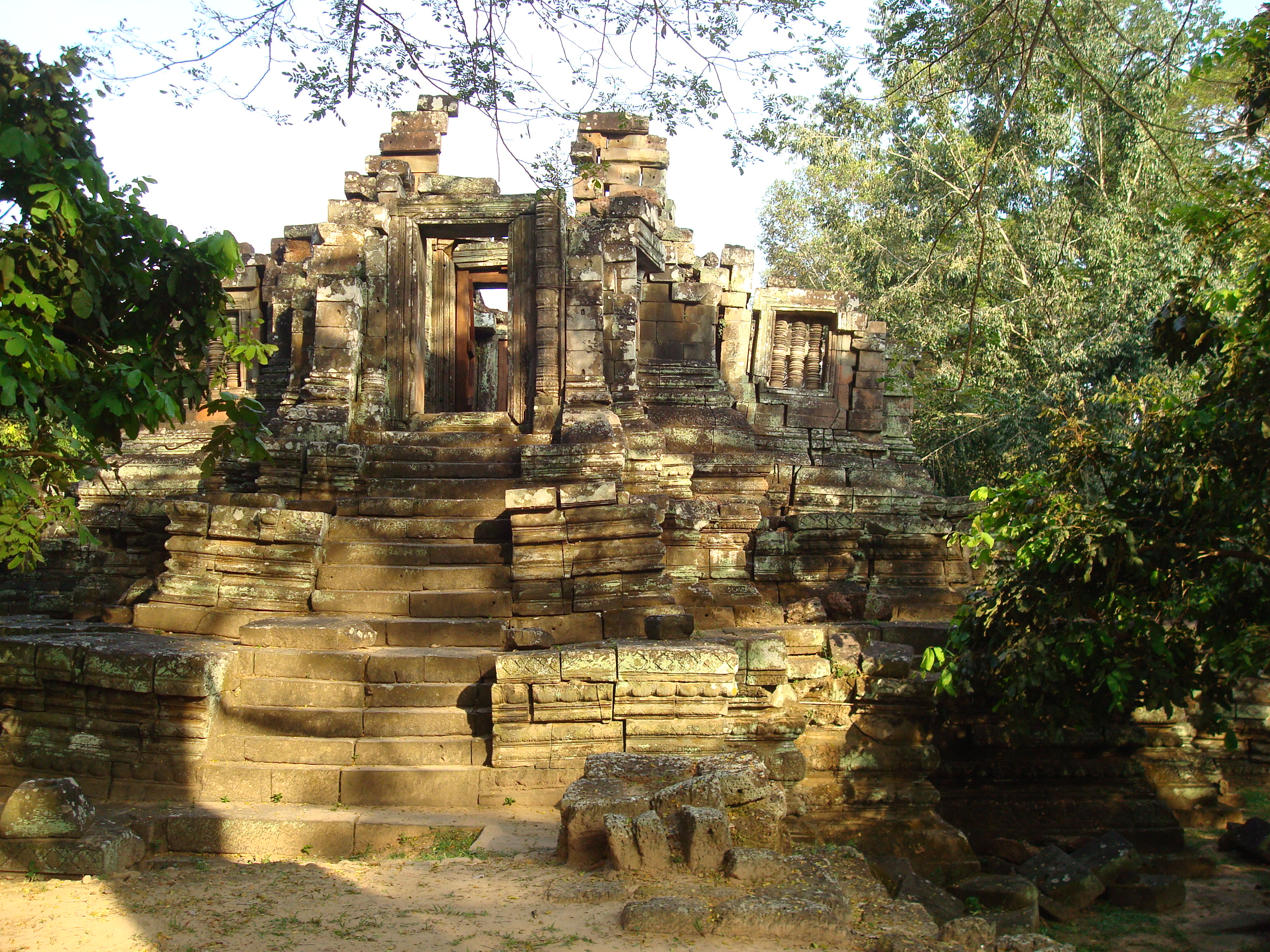
Temple "V"

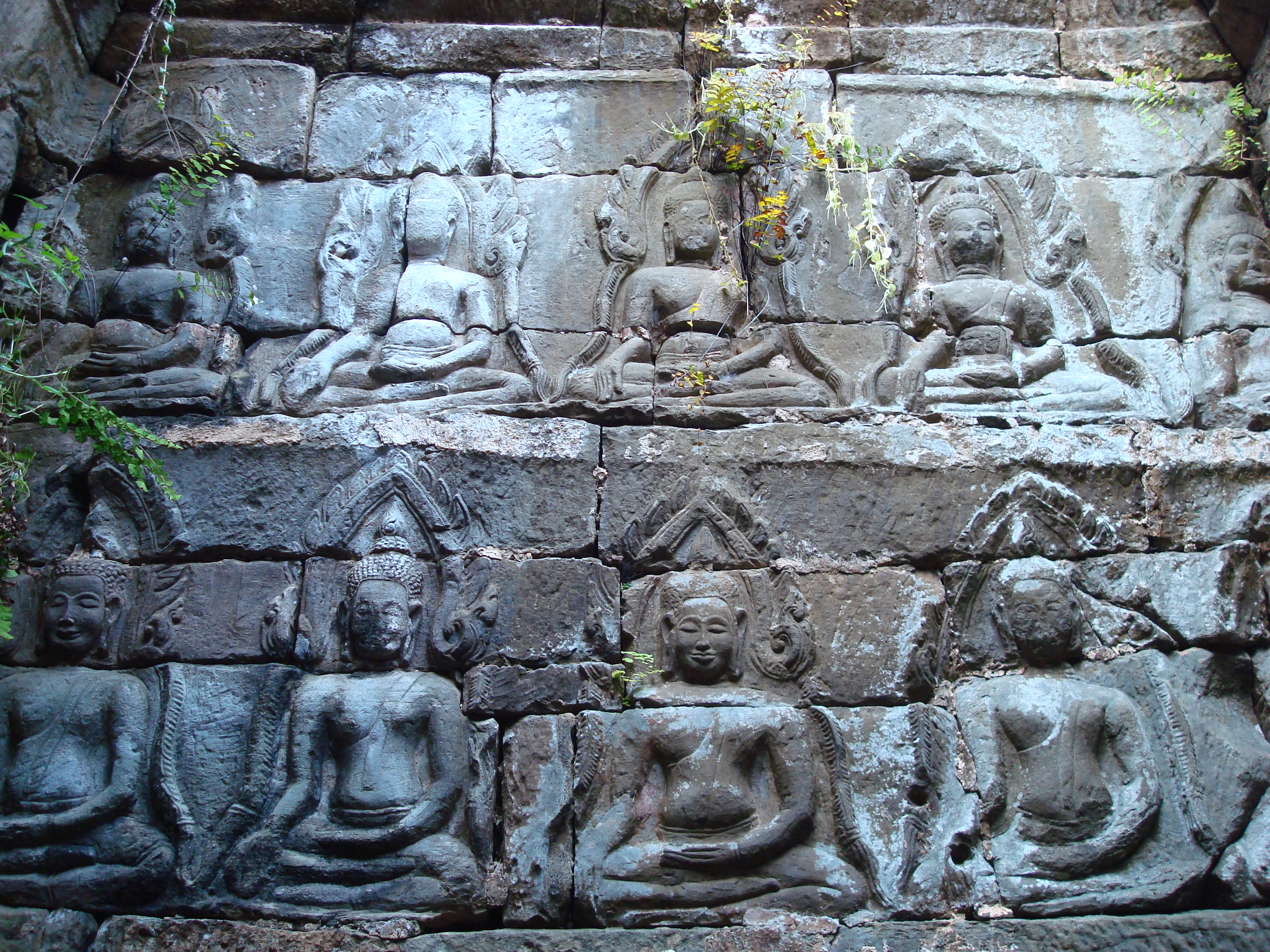
Double row of sculpted Buddhas in sanctuary chamber of temple "X"

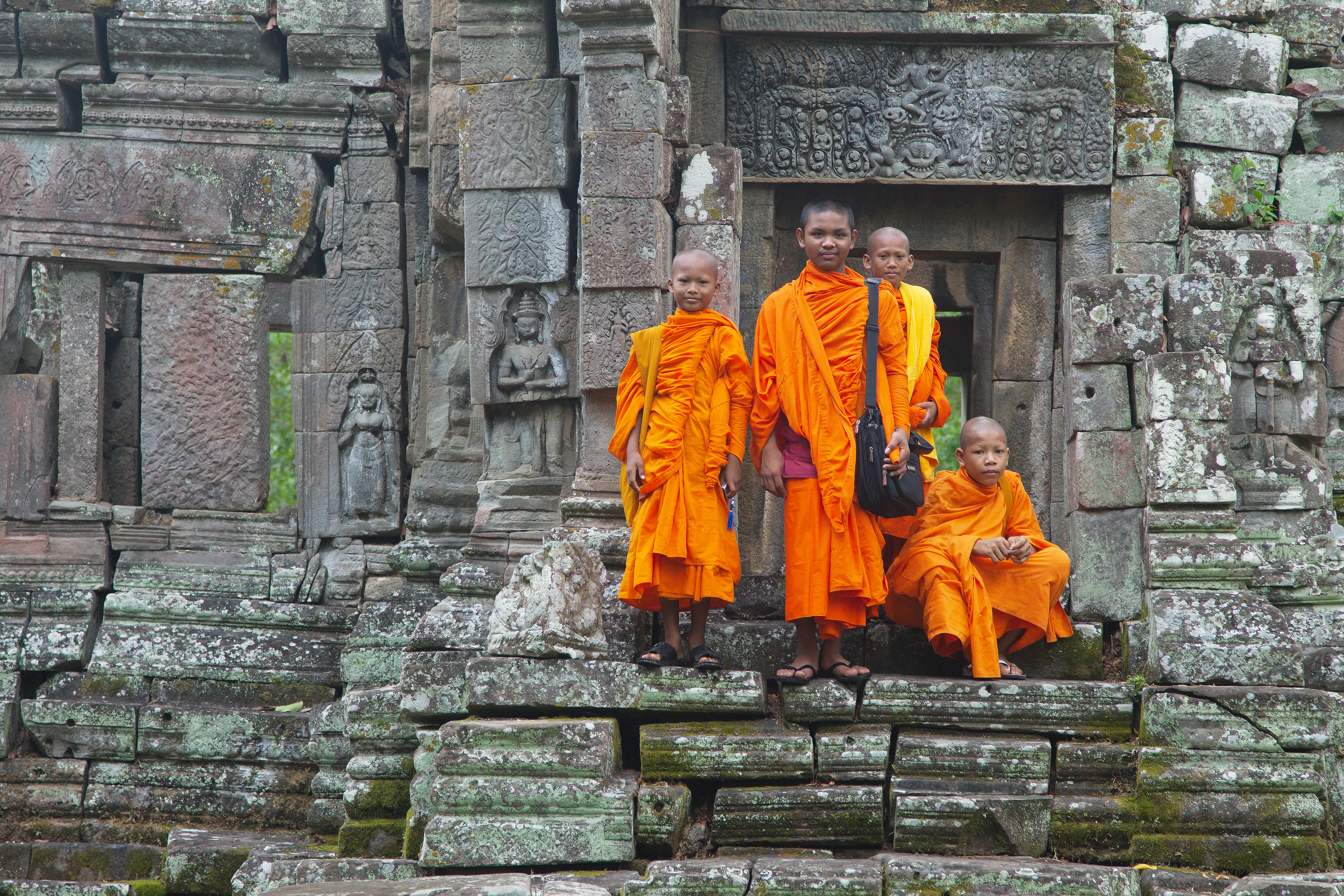
Adolescent monks at temple U

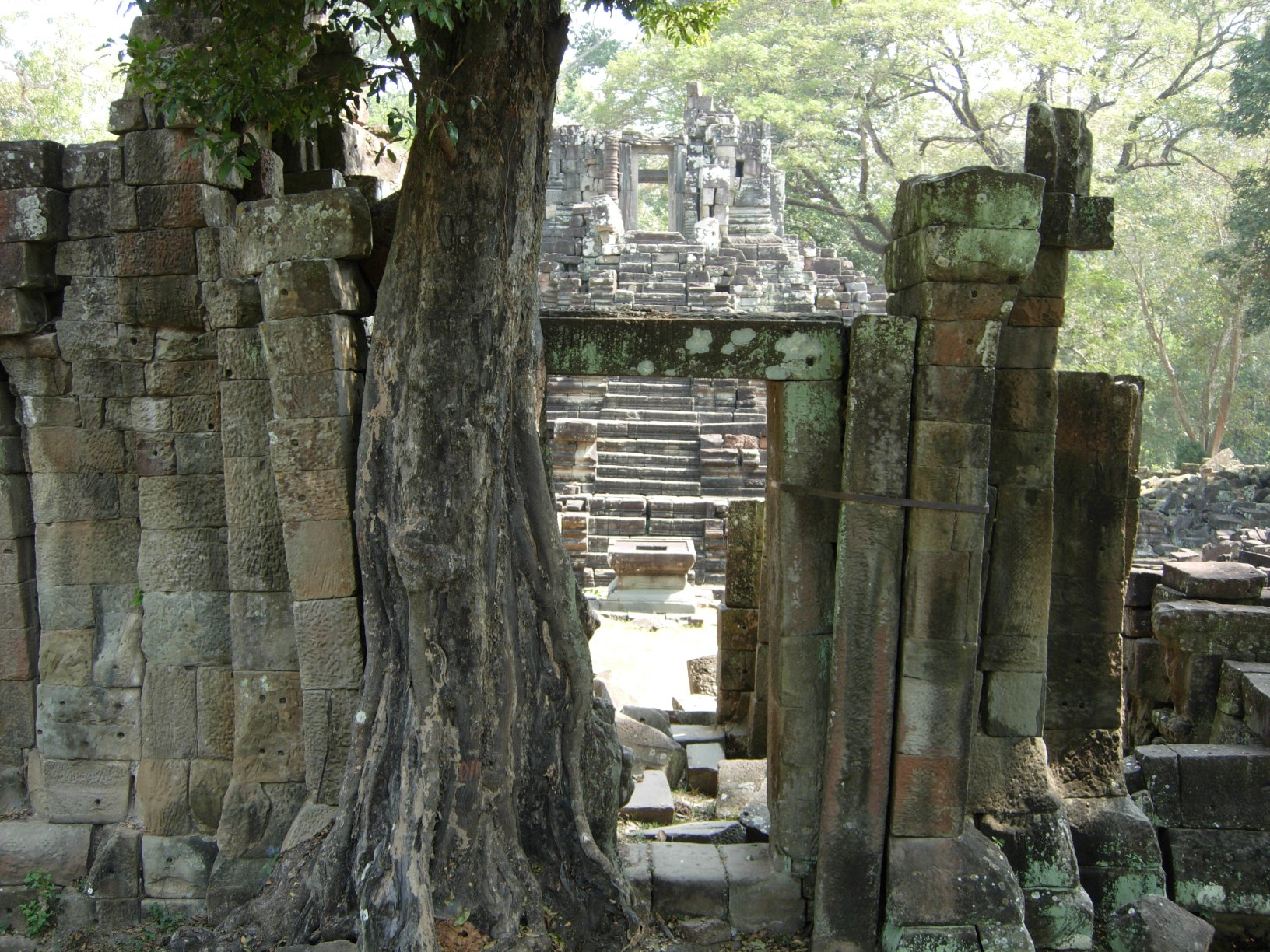
Glimpse of Temple T - Preah Pithu

== See also ==
- Architecture of Cambodia
