= Maršal =

Maršal may refer to:

- Maršal (rank), the top military rank of Yugoslavia
- Maršal (film), a 1999 Croatian comedy otherwise known as Marshal Tito's Spirit
- Maršal (surname)
