= Thibault Marchal =

French footballer (born 1986)

Personal information
- Date of birth: 22 May 1986 (age 40)
- Place of birth: Montmorency, France
- Height: 1.70 m (5 ft 7 in)
- Position: Striker

Team information
- Current team: Clermont B
- Number: 21

Youth career
- Clermont Foot

Senior career*
Years	Team	Apps	(Gls)
2005–2007	Clermont Foot	14	(0)
2008	AS Yzeure		
2008–2009	Stade Bordelais	15	(2)
2009–2010	Carquefou	1	(0)
2010–2011	Manly United	0	(0)
2011–	Clermont B		
- * Club domestic league appearances and goals

Thibault Marchal (born 22 May 1986 in Montmorency, Val-d'Oise) is a French professional football player, who currently plays for Clermont Foot.

== Career ==
He played on the professional level in Ligue 2 for Clermont Foot.
