= Henri Marchal =

French archaeologist and architect

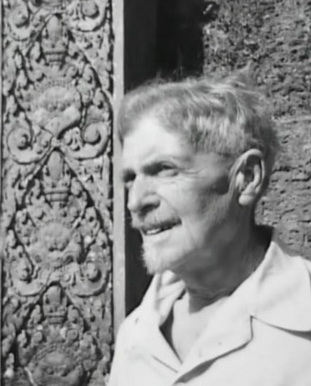
Henri Marchal

Henri Marchal (June 24, 1876 – April 10, 1970) was a French architect and civil servant. He devoted a great part of his life to research on the art and archeology of Cambodia and the conservation and restoration of Khmer monuments at the archeological site of Angkor, in Cambodia.

Marchal was born in Paris. After his baccalauréat in 1895, he was admitted to the École des beaux-arts, section of Architecture, where he attended the workshop led by Gaston Redon.

He was appointed Inspector of civilian buildings of Cambodia in 1905. In 1910 he gained the Khmer language license and was appointed assistant curator of the Ecole française d'Extrême-Orient (EFEO) Museum in Phnom Penh. In 1912 he was dispatched to Saigon, as Inspector of civilian buildings of Cochinchina.

Following the death of Jean Commaille (murdered by bandits while carrying the pay of workers), in 1916 he was dispatched to Angkor to manage Conservation d'Angkor by EFEO. He resumed the cleaning works on Angkor Wat and the excavation of main monuments in central Angkor Thom: Baphuon, the Bayon, Phimeanakas, Preah Pithu, the Royal Palace ecc.).

In 1919 Henri Marchal was appointed permanent member of EFEO and "Curator of Angkor".

Then he began also excavation and cleaning of other monuments outside Angkor Thom: Ta Prohm (in 1920), Preah Khan, Neak Pean, Phnom Bakheng (1922–29), Prasat Kravan (with Henri Parmentier and Victor Goloubew) and Banteay Srei among others.

In 1930 he went to Java to learn the principles of anastylosis from the archeological service of the Dutch East Indies, aware of the limits of the consolidation methods used previously in Angkor. Upon his return, he decided to apply the method of anastylosis for the first time in Angkor on the temple of Banteay Srei. The restoration was unanimously applauded as success.

In 1933 he left the Conservation d'Angkor office to replace Henri Parmentier as Chief of the archaeological service of EFEO, but he reassumed the charge of Curator of Angkor from 1935 to 1937 (because of the tragic suicide of Georges Trouvé) and again from 1947 (replacing Maurice Glaize) to 1953. At that time he was more than seventy-five years old and in an interview on The New York Times said «the work is getting too hard for me»!!!

In the meantime in 1938, on the way back to France, he visited India and Ceylon, which he described in Souvenirs d'un Conservateur, and before returning to Angkor he led an archeological mission at Arikamedu (called Virampatnam by the French), in Puducherry.

From 1948 to 1953 he directed restoration works on the buildings located along the west roadway of Angkor Wat, the Baphuon (1948), Banteay Kdei, Preah Khan and Thommanon (1950). From 1954 to 1957 he was appointed technical advisor of historical monuments and Chief of Department of Public Works of the newly formed Kingdom of Laos.

His love for Angkor and Khmer civilization is testified by his settling in Siem Reap after his retirement, in 1957, until his death in 1970. He died there, aged 93.

== Selected works ==
- Marchal, Henri (1918). "Monuments secondaires et terrasses bouddhiques d'Ańkor Thom" (PDF). BEFEO (in French). 18/8. ISSN 0336-1519.
- Marchal, Henri (1922). "Le temple de Prah Palilay" (PDF). BEFEO (in French). 22: 101–134. doi:10.3406/befeo.1922.2913. ISSN 0336-1519. Archived from the original (PDF) on 2014-01-08.
- 1924–26 – "Les portes monumentales du groupe d'Angkor", AAK 2/1, p. 1–26, pl., ph.
- 1924–26 – "Notes sur le Palais Royal d'Angkor Thom", AAK 2/3, p. 303–328.
- 1925 – "Pavillons d'entrée du Palais Royal d'Angkor Thom", in Études asiatiques (2), Paris, EFEO/G. van Oest (PEFEO 20), p. 57–78, pl. 32-41.
- Marchal, Henri (1928). Guide archéologique aux temples d'Angkor : Angkor Vat, Angkor Thom, et les monuments du petit et du grand circuit (in French). Paris: G. van Oest. OCLC 224296699.
- 1937 – "Kutîçvara » et « Notes sur les Terrasses des Éléphants, du Roi lépreux et le Palais Royal d'Angkor Thom", BEFEO 37/2, p. 333–360.
- 1939 – La collection khmère, (Musée Louis Finot), Hanoi, EFEO, 170 p., 13 pl.
- 1948 – L'architecture comparée dans l'Inde et dans l'Extrême-Orient, Paris, G. van Oest, 262 p.
- Marchal, Henri (1951). Le décor et la sculpture khmers (in French). Paris: G. van Oest. OCLC 3054586.
- 1951 – Le décor et la sculpture khmers, Paris, G. van Oest, 135 p.
- 1957 – Le Temple de Vat Phou, province de Champassak, Saigon, edited by département des Cultes du Gouvernement royal du Laos, 37 p.

== Bibliography ==
- (in French) Henri Marchal's biography on EFEO web site
- (in French) Académie des sciences d'outre-mer (1985). Hommes et destins, dictionnaire biographique d'Outre-Mer (in French). Vol. VI. Académie des sciences d'outre-mer. pp. 280–282. ISBN 2-900098-08-4.
