= Ta Som =

Buddhist temple in Siem Reap, Cambodia

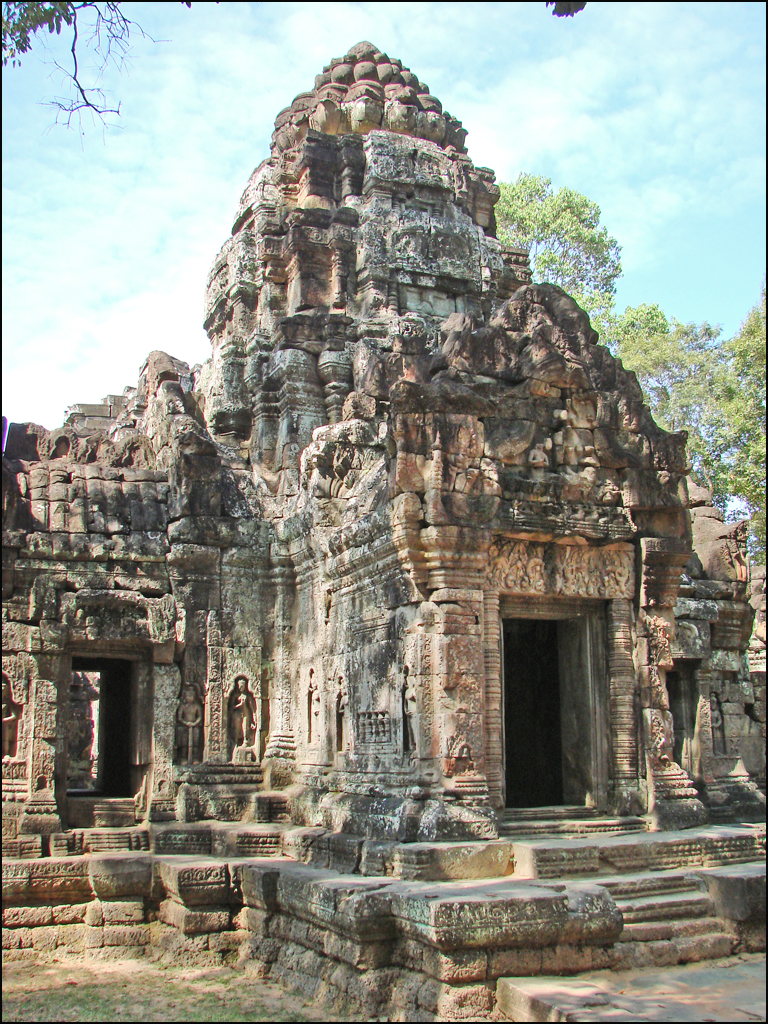
- Inner gopura of Ta Som temple

- Location in Cambodia

Religion
- Affiliation: Buddhism other_info =: Sect: [[{{{sect}}}]]
- Province: Siem Reap
- Deity: Buddhist (dedicated to Dharanindravarman II)

Location
- Location: Angkor Thom
- Country: Cambodia
- Interactive map of Ta Som
- Coordinates: 13°27′52″N 103°54′46″E

Architecture
- Type: Bayon
- Creator: Jayavarman VII
- Completed: end of 12th Century

Ta Som (Khmer: ប្រាសាទតាសោម) is a Buddhist temple at Angkor, Cambodia, built at the end of the 12th century for King Jayavarman VII. It is located north east of Angkor Thom and just east of Neak Pean. The King dedicated the temple to his father Dharanindravarman II (Paramanishkalapada) who was King of the Khmer Empire from 1150 to 1160. The temple consists of a single shrine located on one level and surrounded by enclosure laterite walls. Like the nearby Preah Khan and Ta Prohm the temple was left largely unrestored, with numerous trees and other vegetation growing among the ruins. In 1998, the World Monuments Fund (WMF) added the temple to their restoration program and began work to stabilise the structure to make it safer for visitors.

== Structure ==
Designed to be entered from the east, Ta Som is surrounded by a moat and enclosed by three laterite walls which are broken by two sets of gopura (entrance ways). The gopuras are cross-shaped and contain a small room on each side along with windows containing balusters. The main structure of the gopura are carved with four faces in the Bayon style. The eastern outer gopura has been overgrown by a sacred fig (Ficus religiosa) which has grown down through the blocks that make up the gopura and into the ground. The inner section of the temple consists of a central cruciform sanctuary with porches at each arm surrounded by four corner pavilions. Two small libraries sit on either side of the eastern entrance path.

== Restoration ==
According to the APSARA Authority who manage the temples in the Angkor Park, little restoration work had been done at Ta Som until the 1950s. At this time some propping of structures that were near collapse was carried out. After the WMF added Ta Som to their project, the WMF team began to document and interpret the site and carry out emergency stabilization of fragile structures and improvement to visitor flow around the monument. In 2007, WMF and the APSARA Authority conducted clearing and documentation works that allowed the temple to be accessed from all four sides. Many sandstone blocks were repaired and this allowed the reconstruction of the North Central Fronton of the North Gopura.

== Gallery ==
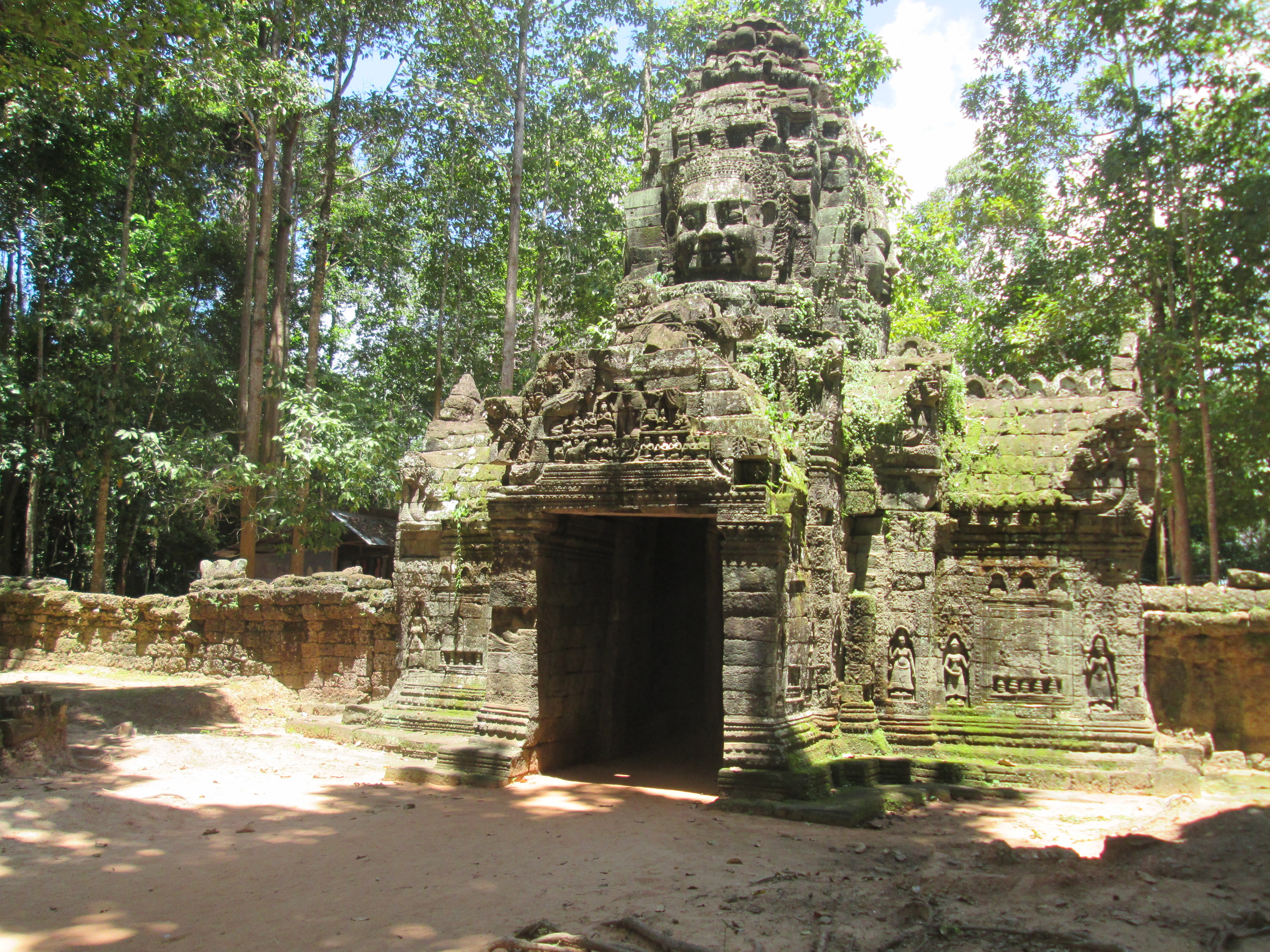
Ta Som Temple

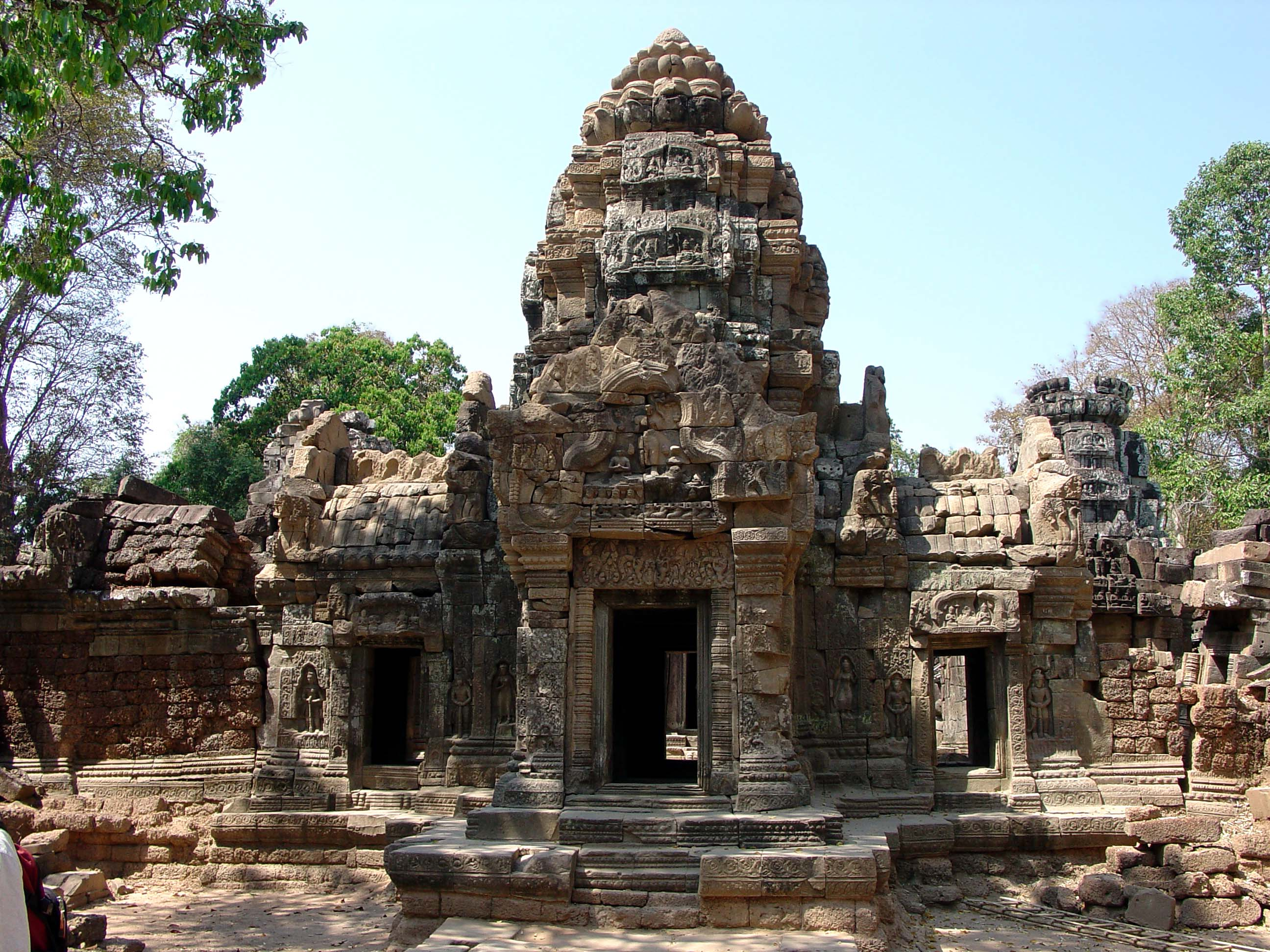
East Tower

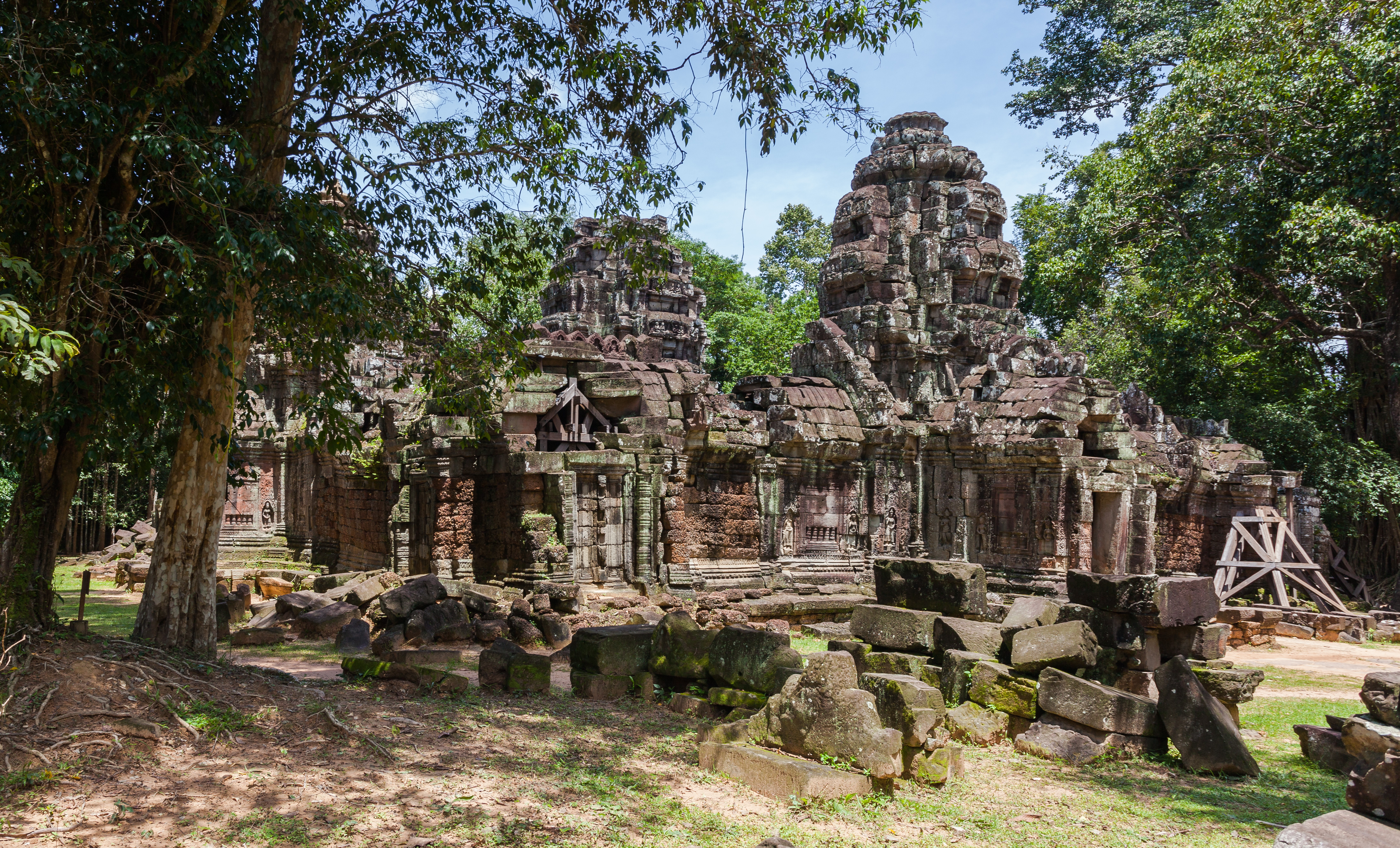
Ruins of the temple

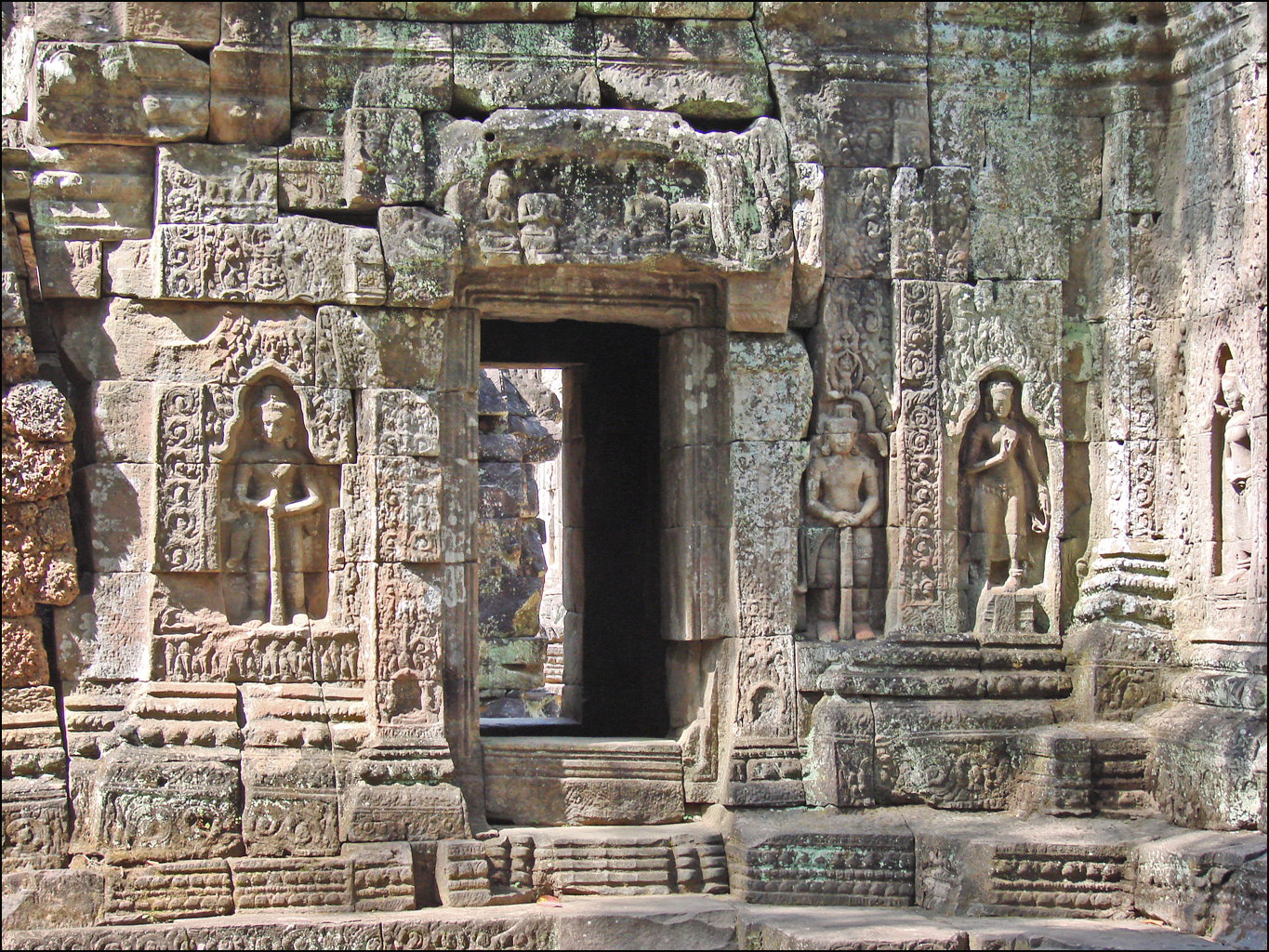
Gate of the gallery surrounded by two guards

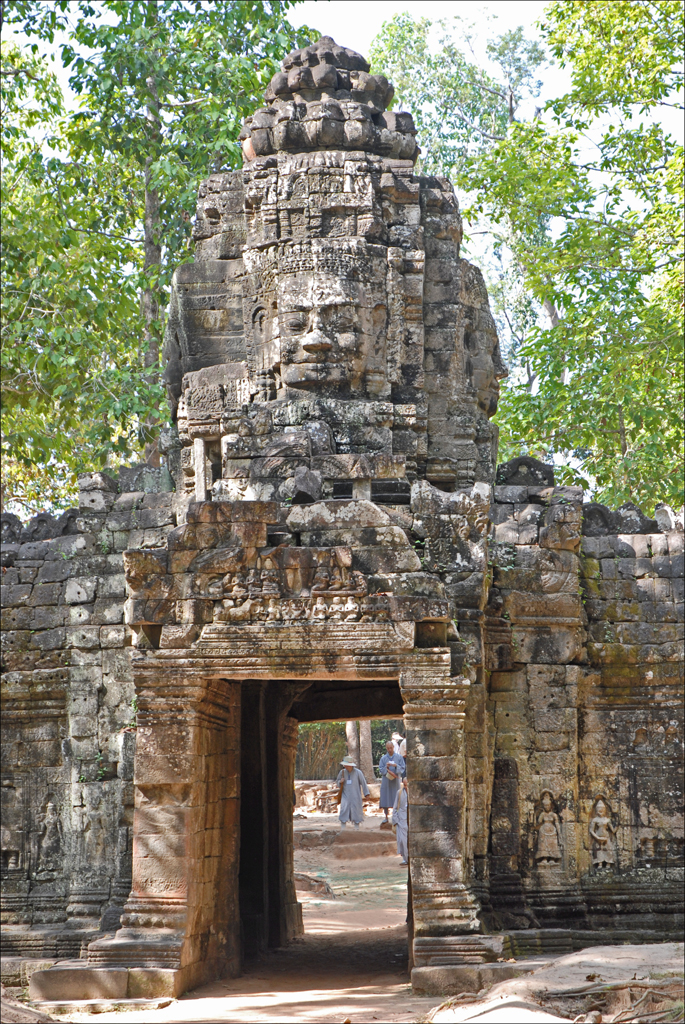
Eastern gopuram

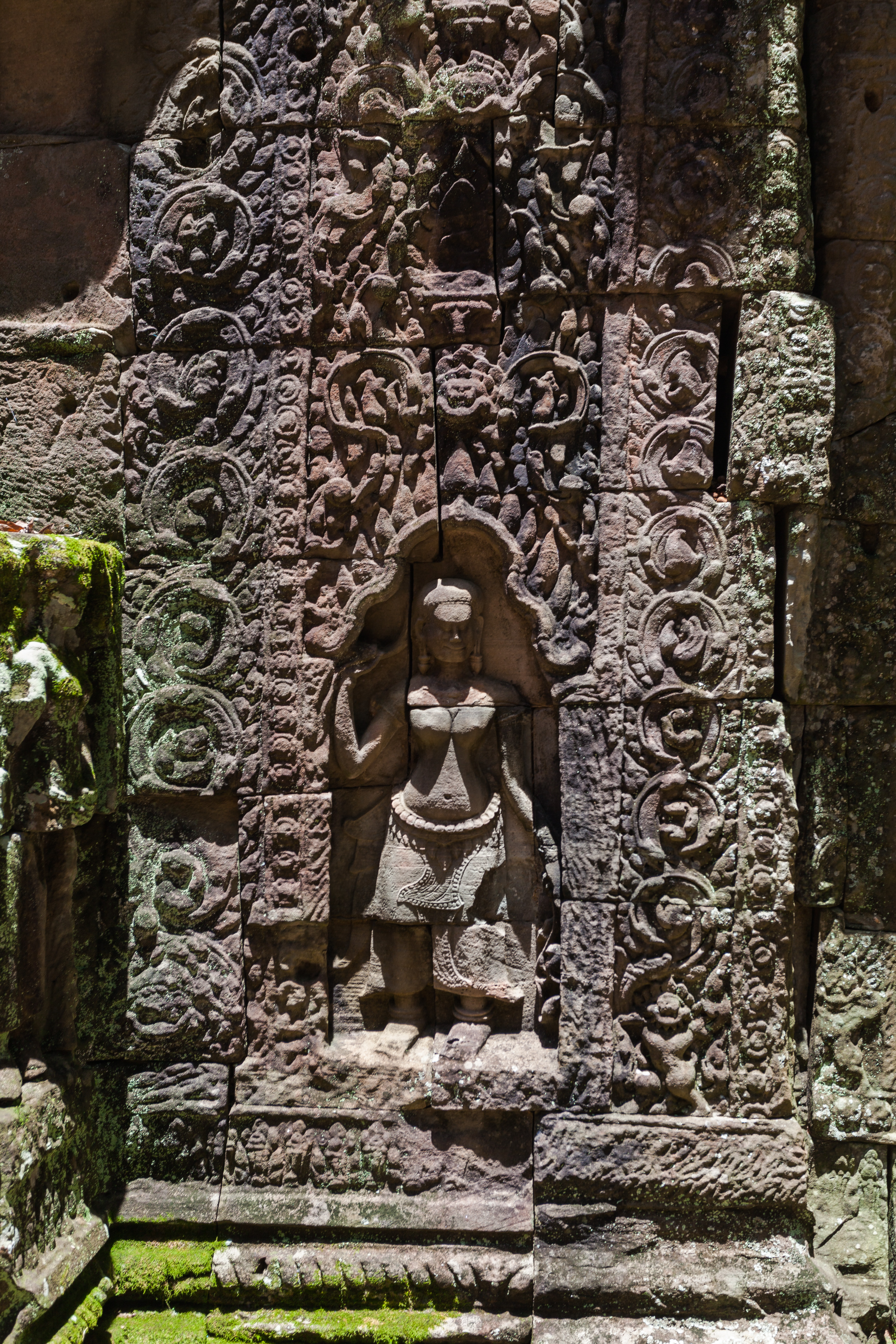
Apsara relief

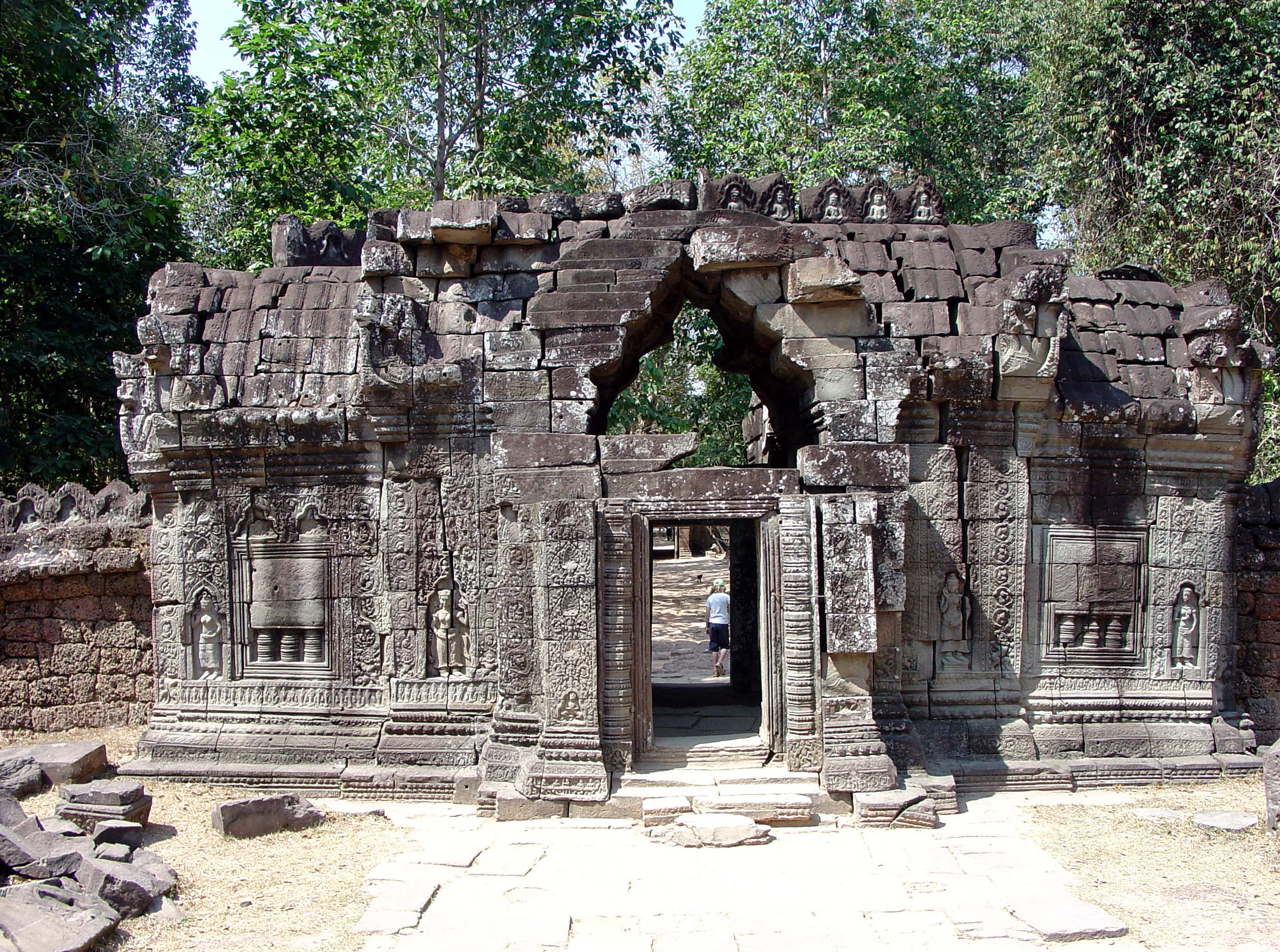
West gopura

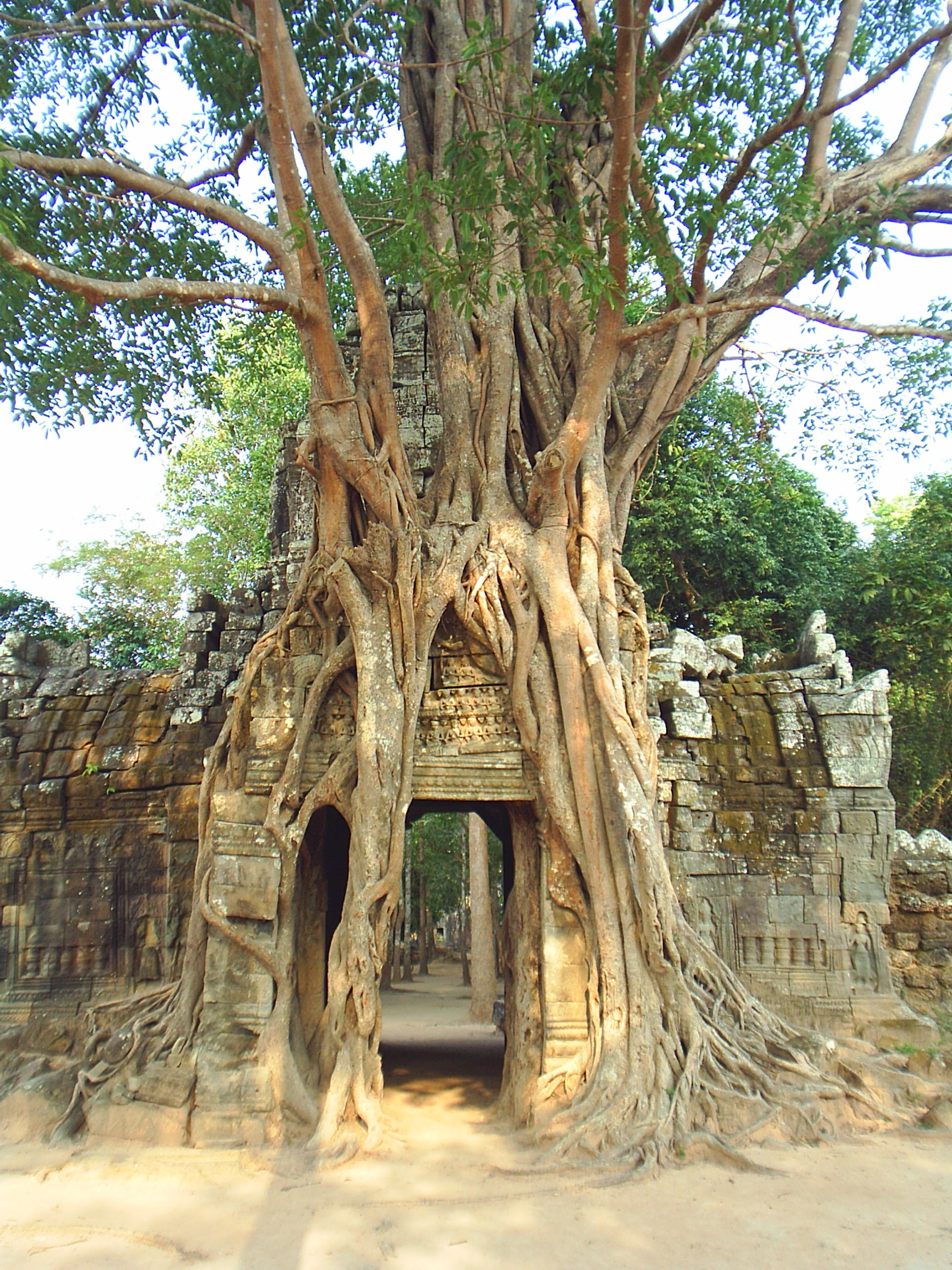
Third eastern gopura, with strangler fig

== Bibliography ==
- Albanese, Marilia (2006). The Treasures of Angkor (Paperback). Vercelli: White Star Publishers. ISBN 88-544-0117-X.
- Freeman, Michael; Jacques, Claude (2003). Ancient Angkor (Paperback). Bangkok: River Books. ISBN 974-8225-27-5.
- Jessup, Helen Ibbitson; Brukoff, Barry (2011). Temples of Cambodia - The Heart of Angkor (Hardback). Bangkok: River Books. ISBN 978-616-7339-10-8.
