= Ukondayu Kazufusa =

17th-century Japanese traveler, merchant and pilgrim

Morimoto Ukondayu Kazufusa (森本右近太夫一房) (d. May 3, 1674, at Kyōto) was a 17th-century Japanese traveler, merchant and pilgrim, who made a journey to Cambodia, and in January 1632 visited the temple of Angkor Wat at Angkor.

Morimoto Kazufusa was the second son of Morimoto Kazuhisa, a senior vassal of Kato Kiyomasa. Before traveling to Cambodia, Morimoto Kazufusa resigned from the Kato clan and served Matsura Clan of Hirado in Nagasaki.

In Angkor, there were altogether 14 inscriptions left by Japanese pilgrims between 1612 and 1632 CE. Among these inscriptions, the best-known inscription was Kazufusa's, telling that he celebrated the Khmer New Year in Angkor in 1632. Kazuhisa prayed for the worldly benefits of his father and for the salvation of his deceased mother. At that time, the temple was thought by the Japanese visitors as the famed Jetavana garden of the Buddha, located in the kingdom of Magadha. Those merchant-pilgrims belonged to the Japanese cities of Higo (肥後), Hizen (肥前国), Hirado (平戸) and Nagasaki (長崎), but some came also from Sakai (堺) and Ōsaka (大阪).

It is believed that Kazufusa was able to return to Japan aboard a red seal ship. His subsequent whereabouts are unknown, as travel between Japan and Southeast Asia was prohibited as part of the Tokugawa's isolation policy that began shortly thereafter. After returning to Japan, Kazufusa resigned from the Matsuura clan and is known to have moved to Yamazaki, Kyoto, the birthplace of his father.

He died in Kyoto in 1674 and is buried at Joganji Temple in Kyoto, along with his father, who died in 1651.
