= Angkor =

Capital city of the Khmer Empire

- អង្គរ (Khmer)
- Yasodharapura
- Location in Cambodia
- 13°24′45″N 103°52′0″E
- Type: Archaeological site
- Periods: Post-classical
- Location: Siem Reap, Cambodia
- Region: Southeast Asia

History
- Built: late 9th century AD
- Built by: Suryavarman II
- Abandoned: 1431 AD

Site notes
- Architectural styles: Bakheng, Pre Rup, Banteay Srei, Khleang, Baphuon, Angkor Wat, Bayon and post-Bayon
- Condition: Restored and ruined
- Management: APSARA authority
- Public access: Ticket required for foreigners

Angkor
UNESCO World Heritage Site
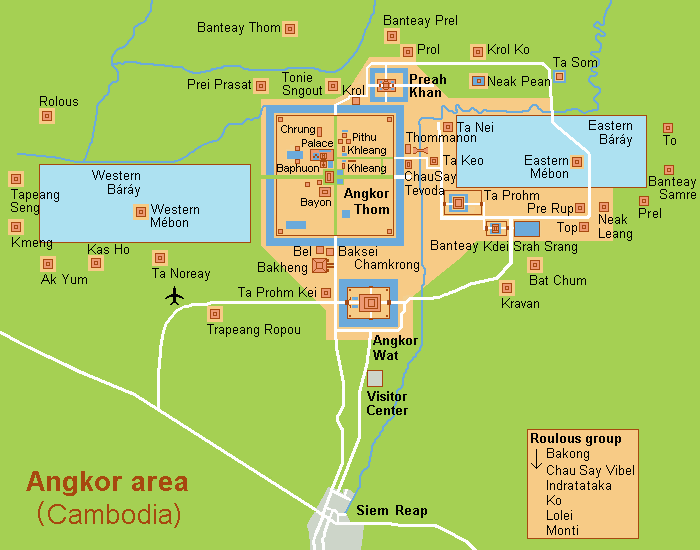
- Interactive map of Angkor
- Location: Siem Reap Province, Cambodia
- Includes: Angkor, Roluos, and Banteay Srei
- Criteria: Cultural: i, ii, iii, iv
- Reference: 668
- Inscription: 1992 (16th Session)
- Endangered: 1992–2004
- Area: 40,100 ha (99,000 acres)
- 1 = Angkor, 2 = Banteay Srei, 3 = Roluos

Angkor (Khmer: អង្គរ [ʔɑŋkɔː], lit. 'capital city'), also known as Yasodharapura (Khmer: យសោធរបុរៈ; Sanskrit: यशोधरपुर), was the capital city of the Khmer Empire, located in present-day Cambodia. The empire flourished from approximately the 9th to the 15th centuries. The site of Angkor has a variety of religious temples, libraries, moats, and other buildings. These other buildings could have been used by officials to the grand palace housing the Khmer king. Those constructed outside the main complex were not made of stone. One of the more visited places in Angkor is Angkor Wat, a temple complex that is one of Cambodia's tourist attractions.

The name Angkor is derived from nokor (នគរ), a Khmer word meaning "kingdom" which in turn derived from Sanskrit nagara (नगर), meaning "city". The Angkorian period began in AD 802, when the Khmer Hindu monarch Jayavarman II declared himself a "universal monarch" and "god-king", and lasted until the late 14th century, first falling under Ayutthayan suzerainty in 1351. A Khmer rebellion against Siamese authority resulted in the 1431 sacking of Angkor by Ayutthaya, causing its population to migrate south to Longvek. The alternate name, Yasodharapura, was derived from the name of the foster mother of Lord Krishna in Hinduism this temple was completed around 921. Hinduism was the dominant religion in the ancient Khmer Empire, and many temples constructed by Khmer kings were dedicated to Hindu deities, including Angkor Wat.

The ruins of Angkor are located amid forests and farmland north of the Great Lake (Tonlé Sap) and south of the Kulen Hills, near modern-day Siem Reap city (13°24′N, 103°51′E), in Siem Reap Province. The temples in the Angkor area sum to over one thousand, including Angkor Wat, is a large religious monument. Many of the temples at Angkor held a variety of religious beliefs, including Shaivite, Buddhist, and Vaishnavite, and many others. Together, they comprise the most significant site of Khmer architecture. Visitors approach two million annually. Angkor was declared a UNESCO World Heritage Site in 1992. This increases their ability to conserve the site for future generations. They are running into problems in trying to preserve the site.

In 2007, an international team of researchers using satellite photographs and other modern techniques concluded that Angkor had been the largest pre-industrial city in the world by surface area, with an elaborate infrastructure system connecting an urban sprawl of at least 1,000 square kilometres (390 sq mi). Archaeologists created an archaeological map that revealed the true size and uncovered a sophisticated water management system. Angkor was considered to be a "hydraulic city" because it had a complicated water management network, which was used for systematically stabilizing, storing, and dispersing water throughout the area. This network is believed to have been used for irrigation in order to offset the unpredictable monsoon season and to also support the increasing population. Although the size of its population remains a topic of research and debate, newly identified agricultural systems in the Angkor area may have supported between 750,000 and 1,000,000 people.

== Archaeological overview ==
Bronze Age to Iron Age in Angkor

The Angkor site transitioned from the Late Bronze Age to the Early Iron Age. Archaeologists dated this shift to 420 BC, using radiocarbon dating of bivalve shells found in graves with the dead. Finding these bivalve shells shows that from the 14th century and possibly earlier. You can see that the people who still lived in Angkor at this time. Which set up the coastal tracts from Southeast Asia, which were involved in the exchange of goods. The earliest Iron Age artefacts they found at this site were iron and bronze spearheads, tool kits with iron-bladed knives, hoes for tilling land, and bangles (bracelets). The Preah Khan is the only temple complex that had remains of iron development at this site, where they found iron slag in proximity to this temple complex.

=== Construction of the buildings in Angkor ===
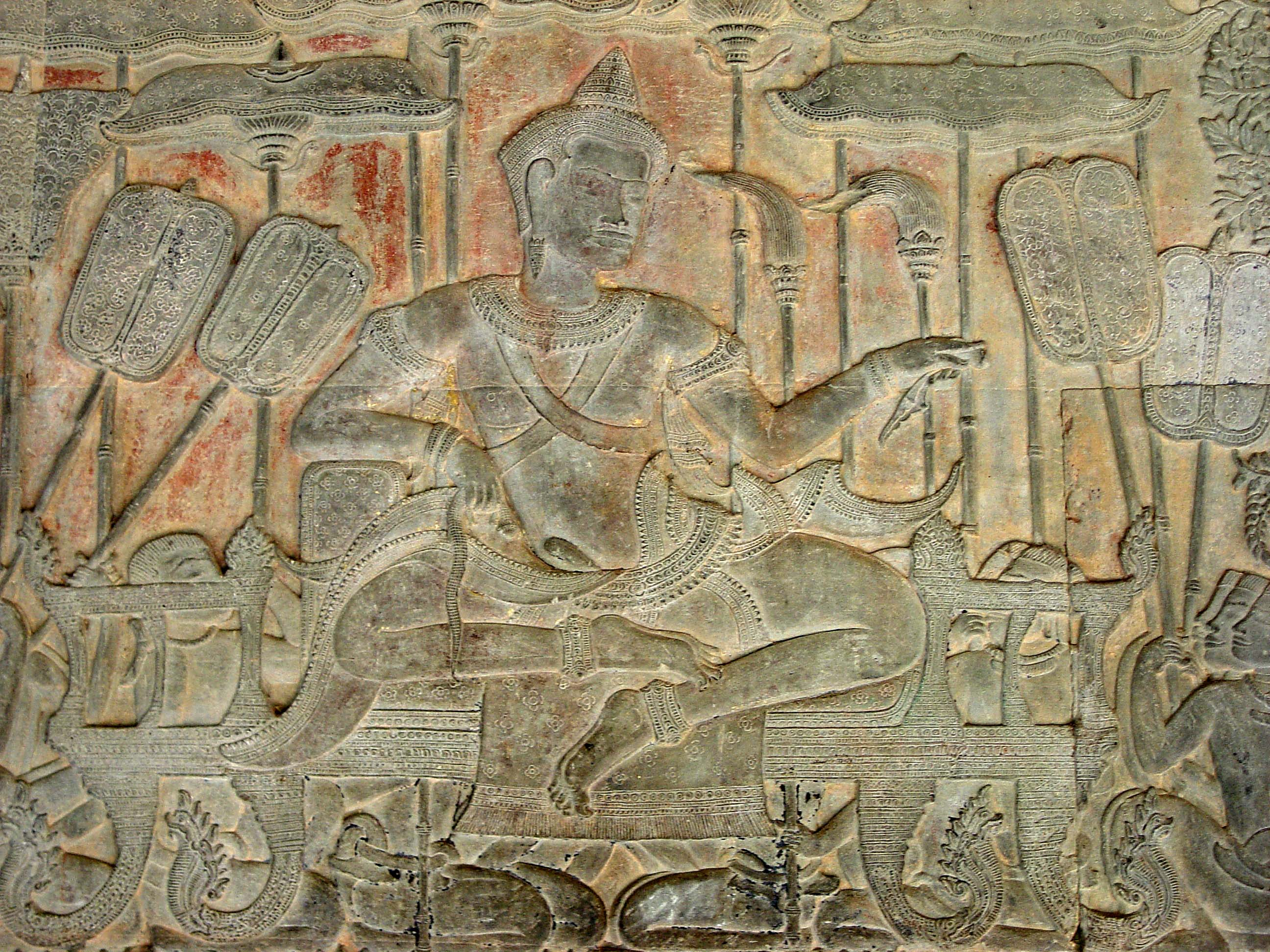
Suryavarman II

The Angkor site and landscape were constructed mainly with Hinduism and Buddhism practitioners in mind. Some of the stone used in the construction of the Angkor came from a quarry that they located using lidar. The quarry that they found was located near Kulen Mountain and was used in the construction of some of the buildings in Angkor. Some of the buildings in Angkor were constructed of wood and tiles. Many of the buildings were built using grey and brown sandstone. This sandstone has magnetic ability which makes it possible to split the construction of these buildings into separate stages of development.

The single largest temple of the Angkorian region, Angkor Wat, was built between 1113 and 1150 by King Suryavarman II. Suryavarman ascended to the throne after prevailing in a battle with a rival prince. An inscription says that, in the course of combat, Suryavarman leapt onto his rival's war elephant and killed him.

After consolidating his political position through military campaigns, diplomacy, and a firm domestic administration, Suryavarman launched into the construction of Angkor Wat as his personal temple mausoleum. With walls nearly half a mile long on each side, Angkor Wat grandly portrays the Hindu cosmology, with the central towers representing Mount Meru, home of the gods; the outer walls, the mountains enclosing the world; and the moat, the oceans beyond.

The traditional theme of identifying the Khmer devaraja with the gods, and his residence with that of the celestials, is very much in evidence. The measurements of the temple and its parts in relation to one another have cosmological significance. Suryavarman had the walls of the temple decorated with bas reliefs depicting not only scenes from mythology, but also from the life of his own imperial court. In one of the scenes, the king is portrayed as larger than his subjects, sitting cross-legged on an elevated throne and holding court, while a bevy of attendants make him comfortable with the aid of parasols and fans.

==== Roads and Canals ====
Angkor consists of roads and canals that intertwine through the civilization, creating a grid-like outline that contour the buildings. These aspects of Angkor are said to be important for the past, being used for things such as transportation or trade. Each block contains homes or reservoirs that were essential for every day life. However, with the population so large at the time, large-scale hydraulic systems were difficult to create, making it hard to do projects essential for community life. Archaeologists suggest that nearby sites were not connected to Angkor via main roads, yet many were connected with rivers. Various roads were mostly elevated above the land with ditches alongside the roads. These trenches would fill up during heavy rain, which could have possibly been used for water transport between communities. The natural canals supported Angkor in natural ways, including the use of an irrigation system. These canals were intertwined among the architecture and allowed flooding in crop fields, creating an environmentally friendly way of watering thousands of crops at a time.

The roads were constructed using many layers of dirt and soil that were compacted together. In the past, they had methods of regenerating and improving these roads. These roads and canals are also hypothesized to have helped with contact among other empires. The roads share main principles that point to communication. These principles include engineered routes and the development of roads over time, meaning they became more complexly constructed as time progressed. Finally, these roads are made to expand as the economy grows, making archaeologists believe that communication was their main use.

LiDAR

At the Angkor site, archaeologists have used LiDAR (Light Detection and Ranging) to uncover structures such as building rods, monuments, and other features. This was beneficial for archaeologists to use because of Angkor's location. Some of the site, is in dense forest, which would be difficult for archaeologists to navigate. They used LiDAR to show that the cities after the decline of Angkor were sparsely populated.

== Historical overview ==
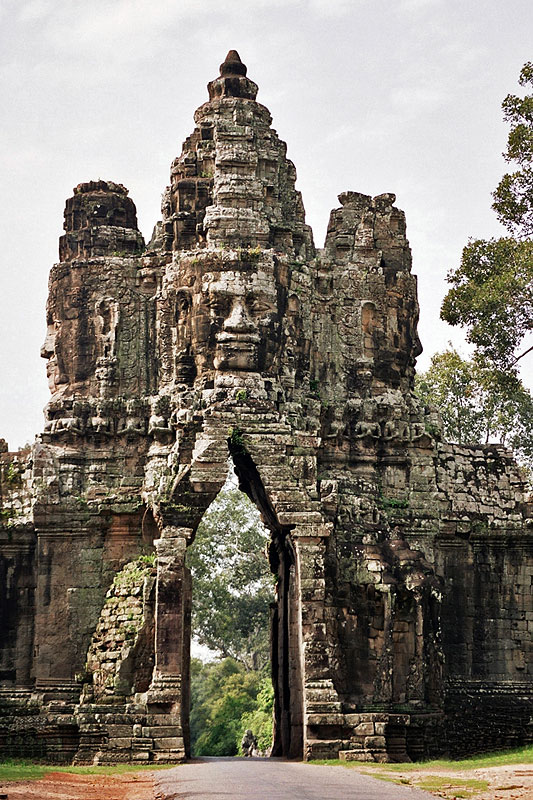
South gate into Angkor Thom

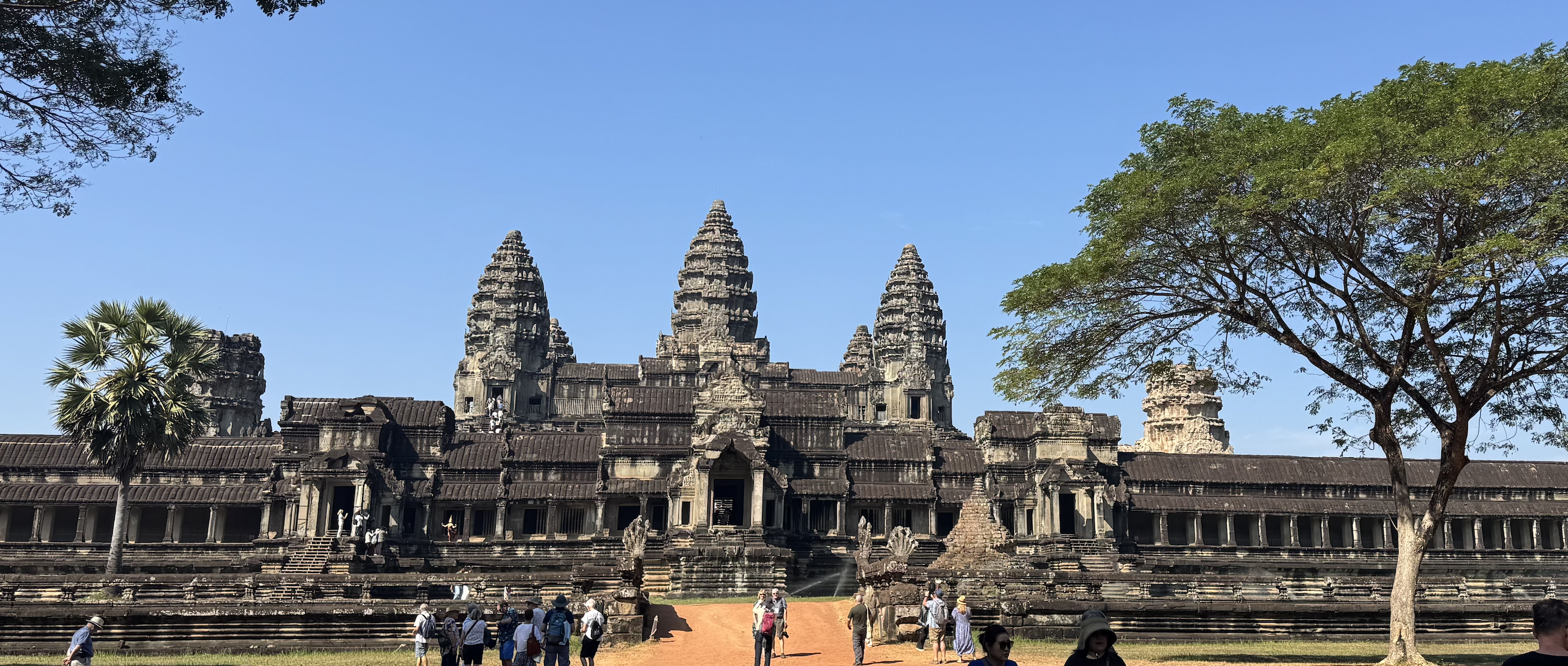
The east gate or "exit" of Angkor Wat

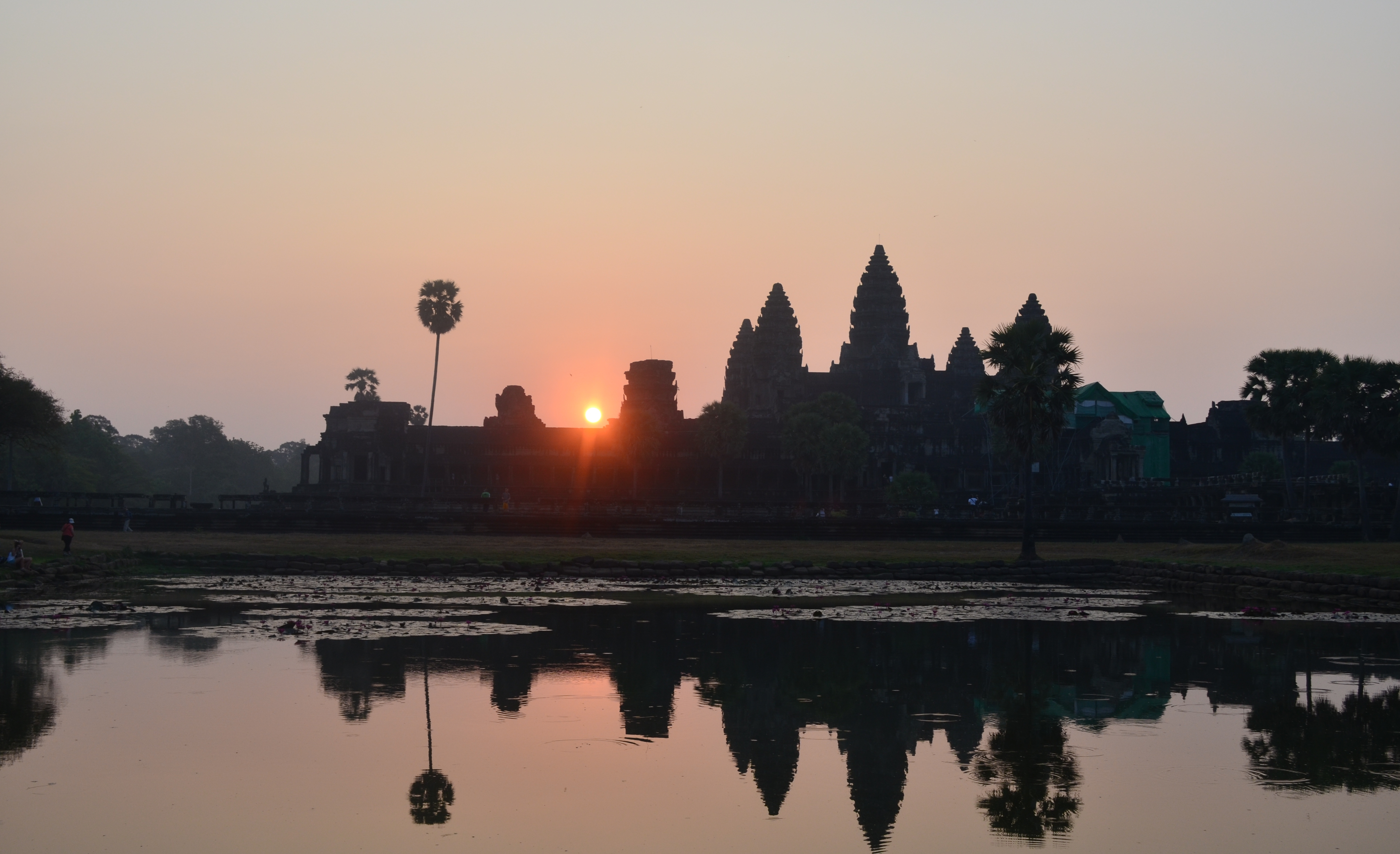
Angkor Wat at sunrise

=== Seat of the Khmer Empire ===
Angkor underwent many empire leaders and experienced a shifting royalties for many years, which had potential to create chaos. The Angkorian period begun shortly after 800 AD, when the Khmer King Jayavarman II announced the independence of Kambujadesa (Cambodia) from Java. According to Sdok Kok Thom inscription, circa 781 Indrapura was the first capital of Jayavarman II, located in Banteay Prei Nokor, near today's Kompong Cham. After he eventually returned to his home, the former kingdom of Chenla, he quickly built up his influence, conquered a series of competing kings, and in 790 became king of Kambuja. He then moved northwest to Mahendraparvata, in present-day Kulen mountains, inland north from the great lake of Tonle Sap.

He also established the city of Hariharalaya (now known as Roluos) at the northern end of Tonlé Sap. Through a program of military campaigns, alliances, marriages and land grants, he achieved a unification of the country bordered by China to the north, Champa (now Central Vietnam) to the east, the ocean to the south and a place identified by a stone inscription as "the land of cardamoms and mangoes" to the west. In 802 AD, Jayavarman articulated his new status by declaring himself "universal monarch" (chakravartin) and, in a move that was to be imitated by his successors and that linked him to the cult of Siva, taking on the epithet of "god-king" (devaraja). Before Jayavarman, Cambodia had consisted of a number of politically independent principalities collectively known to the Chinese by the names Funan and Chenla.

In 889 AD, Yasovarman ascended to the throne. A great king and an accomplished builder, he was celebrated by one inscription as "a lion-man; he tore the enemy with the claws of his grandeur; his teeth were his policies; his eyes were the Veda." Near the old capital of Hariharalaya, Yasovarman constructed a new city, Yasodharapura, centered on the hill and temple of Phnom Bakheng. In the tradition of his predecessors, he also constructed a massive reservoir called baray.

The significance of such reservoirs has been debated by modern scholars, some believing the use was the irrigation of rice fields, others have regarded them as religiously charged symbols of the great mythological oceans surrounding Mount Meru, the abode of the gods. The mountain, in turn, was represented by an elevated temple, in which the "god-king" was represented by a lingam. In accordance with this cosmic symbolism, Yasovarman built his central temple on a low hill known as Phnom Bakheng, surrounding it with a moat fed from the baray. He also built numerous other Hindu temples and ashrams, or retreats for ascetics.

Over the next 300 years, between 900 and 1200 AD, the Khmer Empire produced architectural masterpieces known as Angkor. Most are concentrated in an area approximately 15 miles (24 km) east to west and 5 miles (8.0 km) north to south. The Angkor Archaeological Park, which administers the area, includes sites as far away as Kbal Spean, about 30 miles (48 km) to the north. Around 72 major temples or other buildings are found within this area, and the remains of several hundred additional minor temple sites are scattered throughout the landscape beyond.

Because of the low-density and dispersed nature of the medieval Khmer settlement pattern, Angkor lacks a formal boundary, and its extent is therefore difficult to determine. However, a specific area of at least 1,000 km^{2} (390 sq mi) beyond the major temples is defined by a complex system of infrastructure, including roads and canals that indicate a high degree of connectivity and functional integration with the urban core. In terms of spatial extent (although not in terms of population), this makes it the largest urban agglomeration in recorded history prior to the Industrial Revolution, easily surpassing the nearest claim by the Maya city of Tikal. At its peak, the city occupied an area greater than modern Paris, and its buildings use far more stone than all of the Egyptian structures combined.

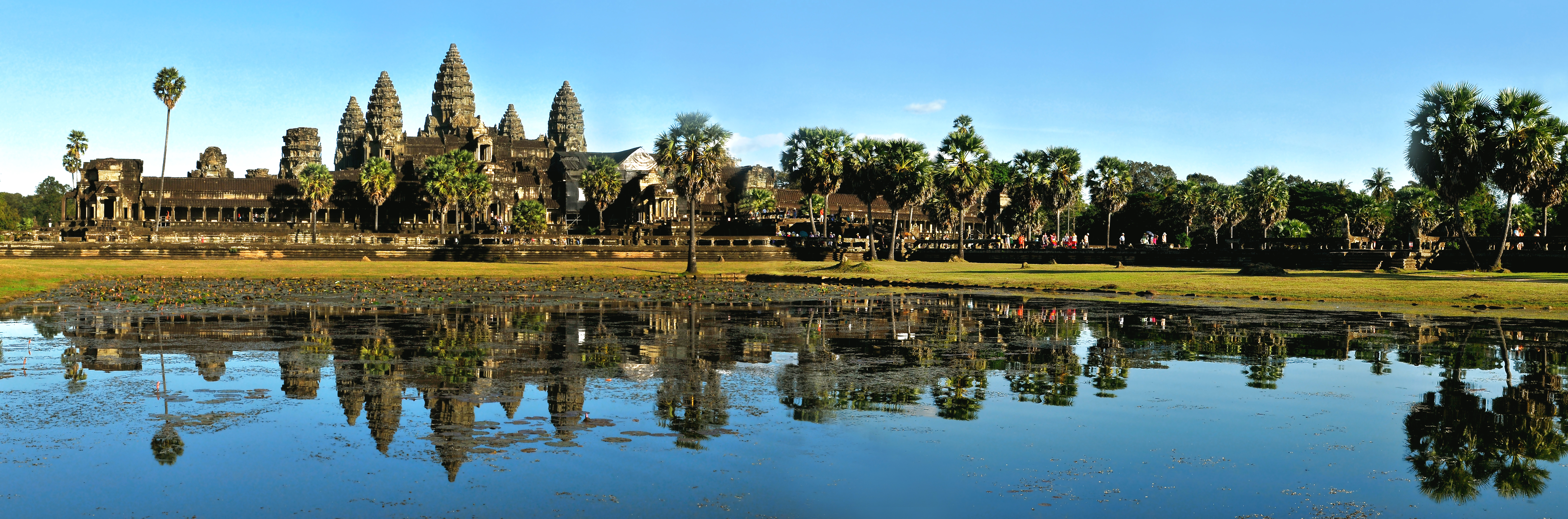
The main temple reflected in the northern reflection pond. Angkor Wat, Siem Reap, Cambodia.

=== Jayavarman VII ===
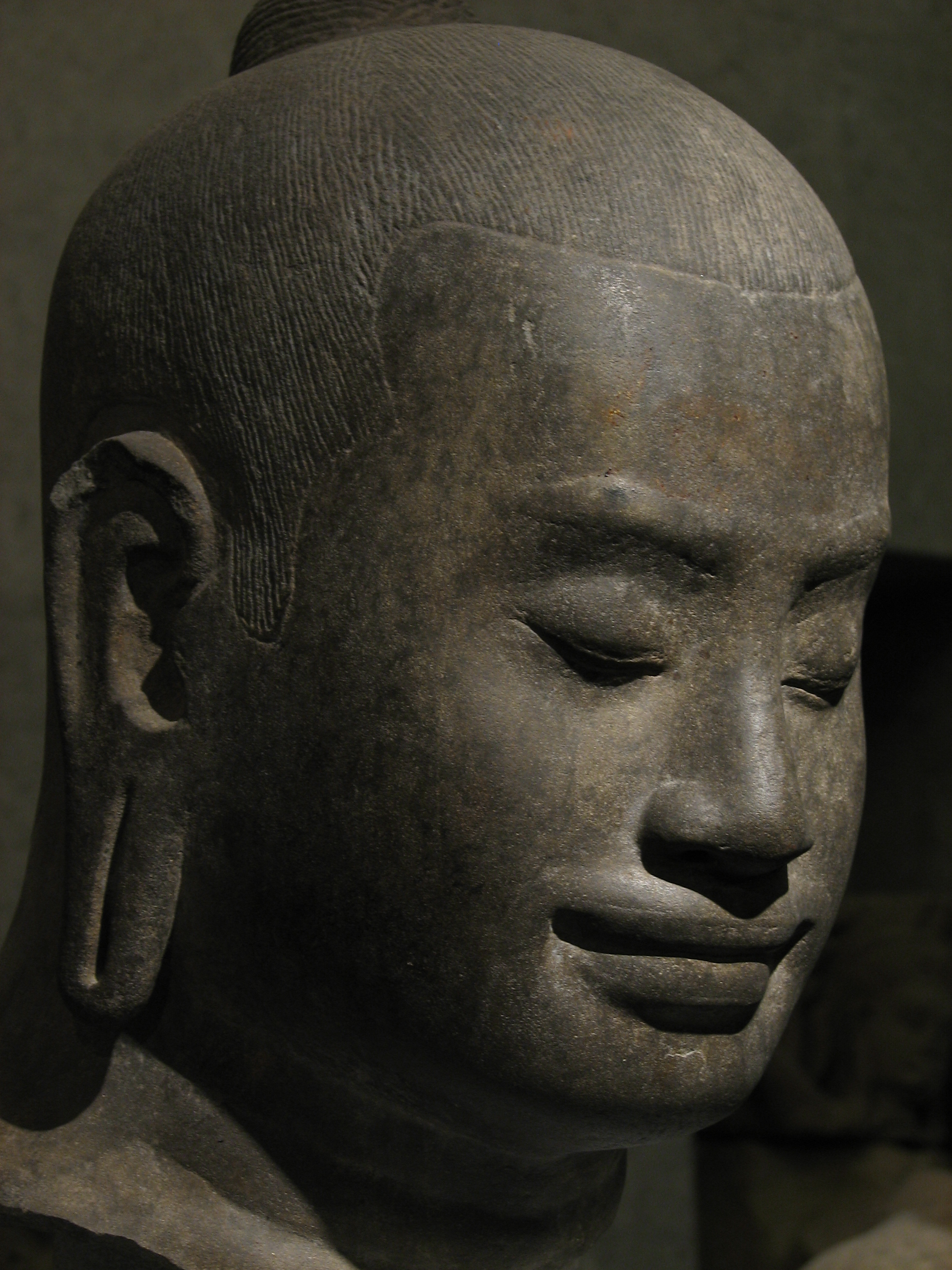
A bust of Jayavarman VII on display at Musee Guimet, Paris

Following the death of Suryavarman around 1150 AD, the kingdom fell into a period of internal strife. Its neighbors to the east, the Cham of what is present-day southern Vietnam, took advantage of the situation in 1177 to launch a water-borne invasion up the Mekong River and across Tonlé Sap. The Cham forces were successful in sacking the Khmer capital of Yasodharapura and killed the reigning king. However, a Khmer prince who was to become King Jayavarman VII rallied his people and defeated the Cham in battles on the lake and on the land. In 1181, Jayavarman assumed the throne. He was to be the greatest of the Angkorian kings.

Over the ruins of Yasodharapura, Jayavarman constructed the walled city of Angkor Thom, as well as its geographic and spiritual center, the temple known as the Bayon. Bas-reliefs at the Bayon depict not only the king's battles with the Cham, but also scenes from the life of Khmer villagers and courtiers. Jayavarman oversaw the period of Angkor's most prolific construction, which included building the well-known temples of Ta Prohm and Preah Khan, dedicating them to his parents.

This massive program of construction coincided with a transition in the state religion from Hinduism to Mahayana Buddhism, since Jayavarman himself had adopted the latter as his personal faith. During Jayavarman's reign, Hindu temples were altered to display images of the Buddha, and Angkor Wat briefly became a Buddhist shrine. Following his death, the revival of Hinduism as the state religion included a large-scale campaign of desecrating Buddhist images, and continued until Theravada Buddhism became established as the land's dominant religion from the 14th century.

=== Zhou Daguan ===
The year 1296 marked the arrival at Angkor of the Chinese diplomat Zhou Daguan representing the Yuan dynasty. Zhou's one-year sojourn in the Khmer capital during the reign of King Indravarman III is historically significant, because he penned a still-surviving account, The Customs of Cambodia, of approximately forty pages detailing his observations of Khmer society. Some of the topics he addressed in the account were religion, justice, kingship, societal norms, agriculture, slavery, birds, vegetables, bathing, clothing, tools, draft animals, and commerce.

In one passage, he described a royal procession consisting of soldiers, numerous servant women and concubines, ministers and princes, and finally, "the sovereign, standing on an elephant, holding his sacred sword in his hand." Together with the inscriptions that have been found on Angkorian stelae, temples and other monuments, and with the bas-reliefs at the Bayon and Angkor Wat, Zhou's journal is an important source of information about everyday life at Angkor.

Bas-reliefs of Angkor

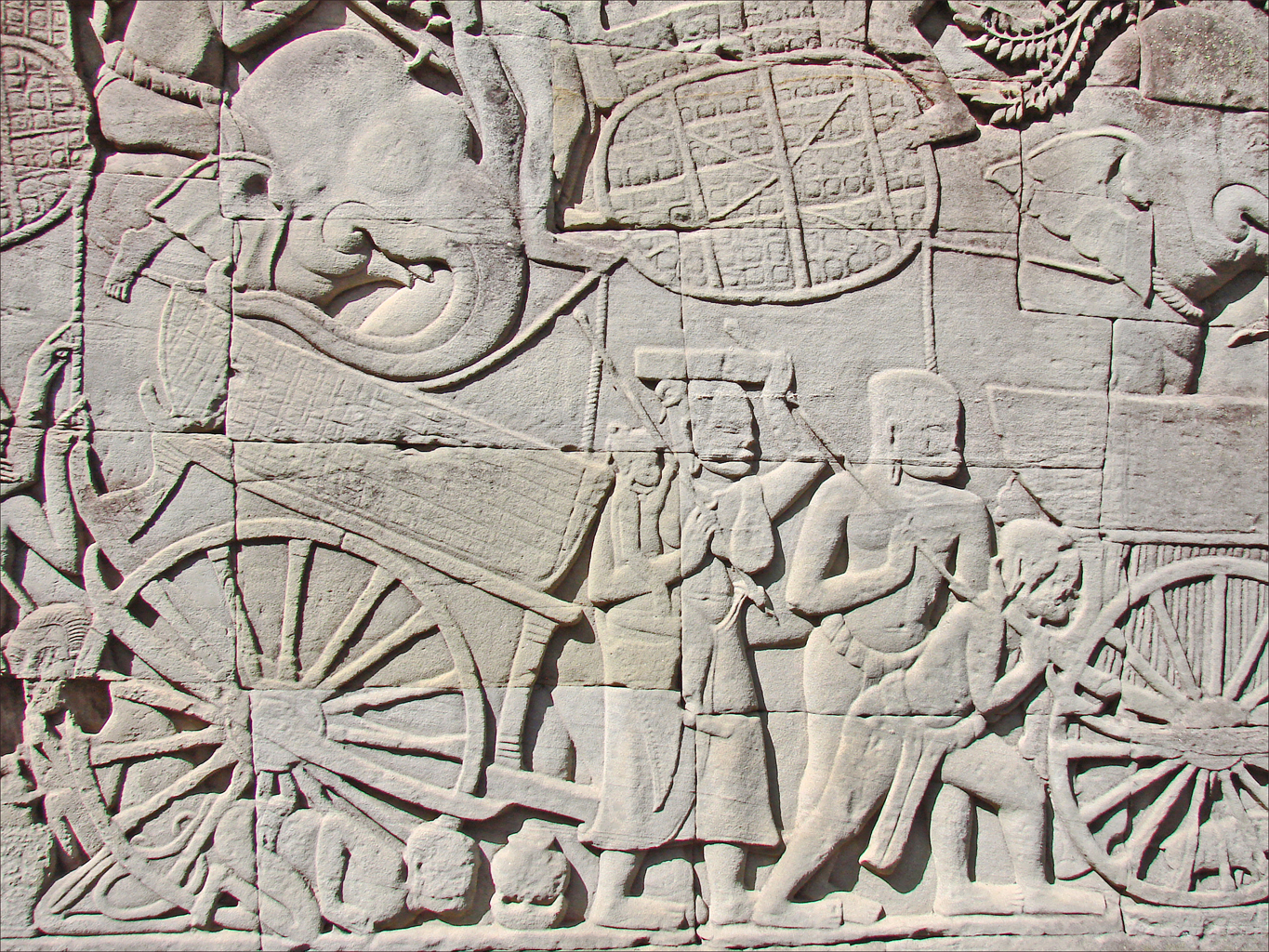

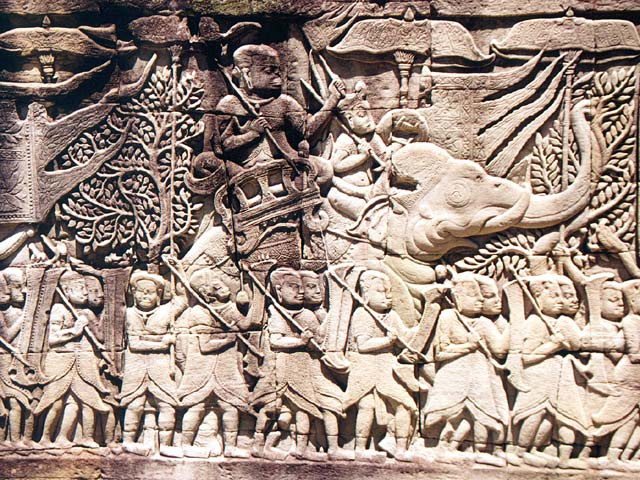

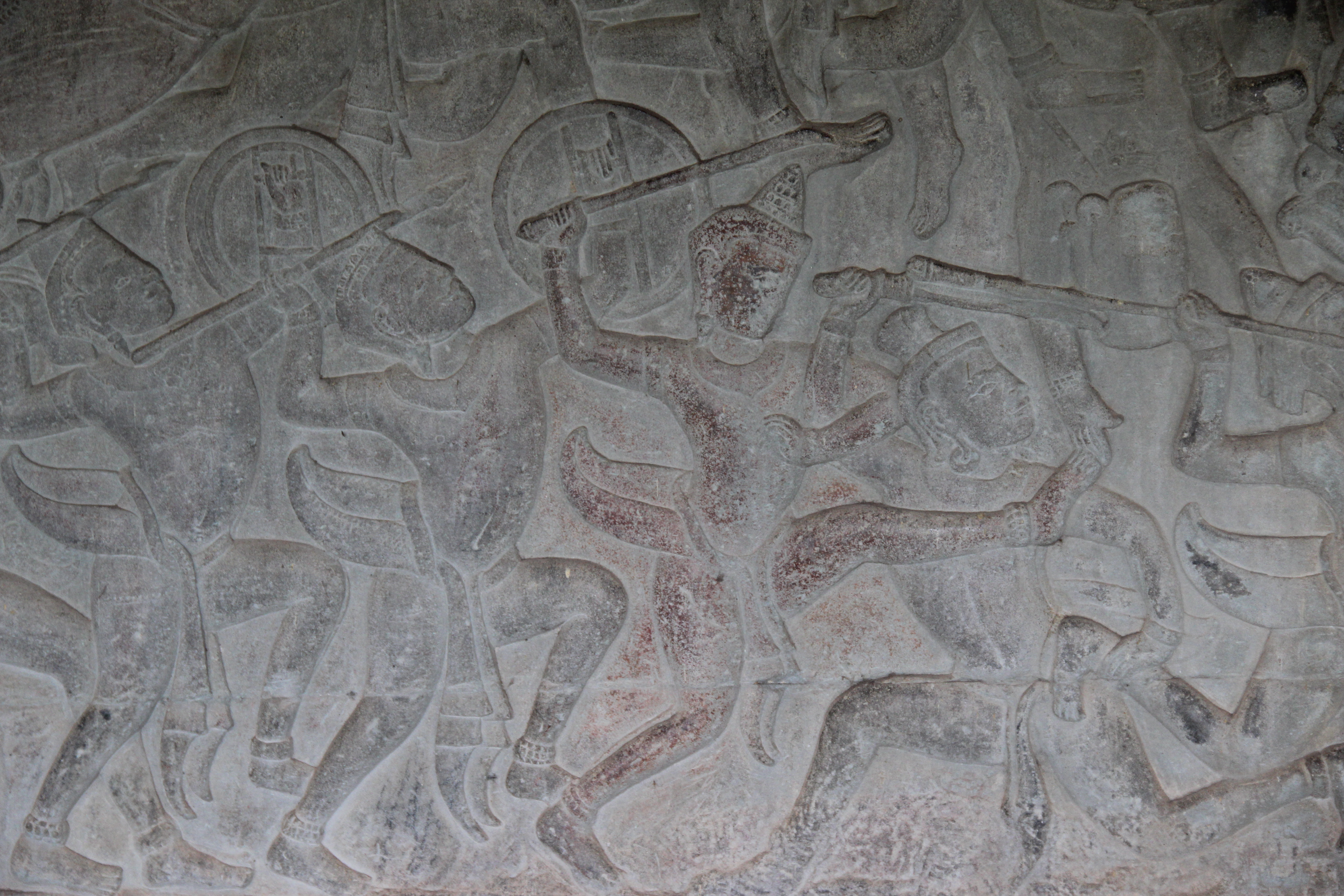

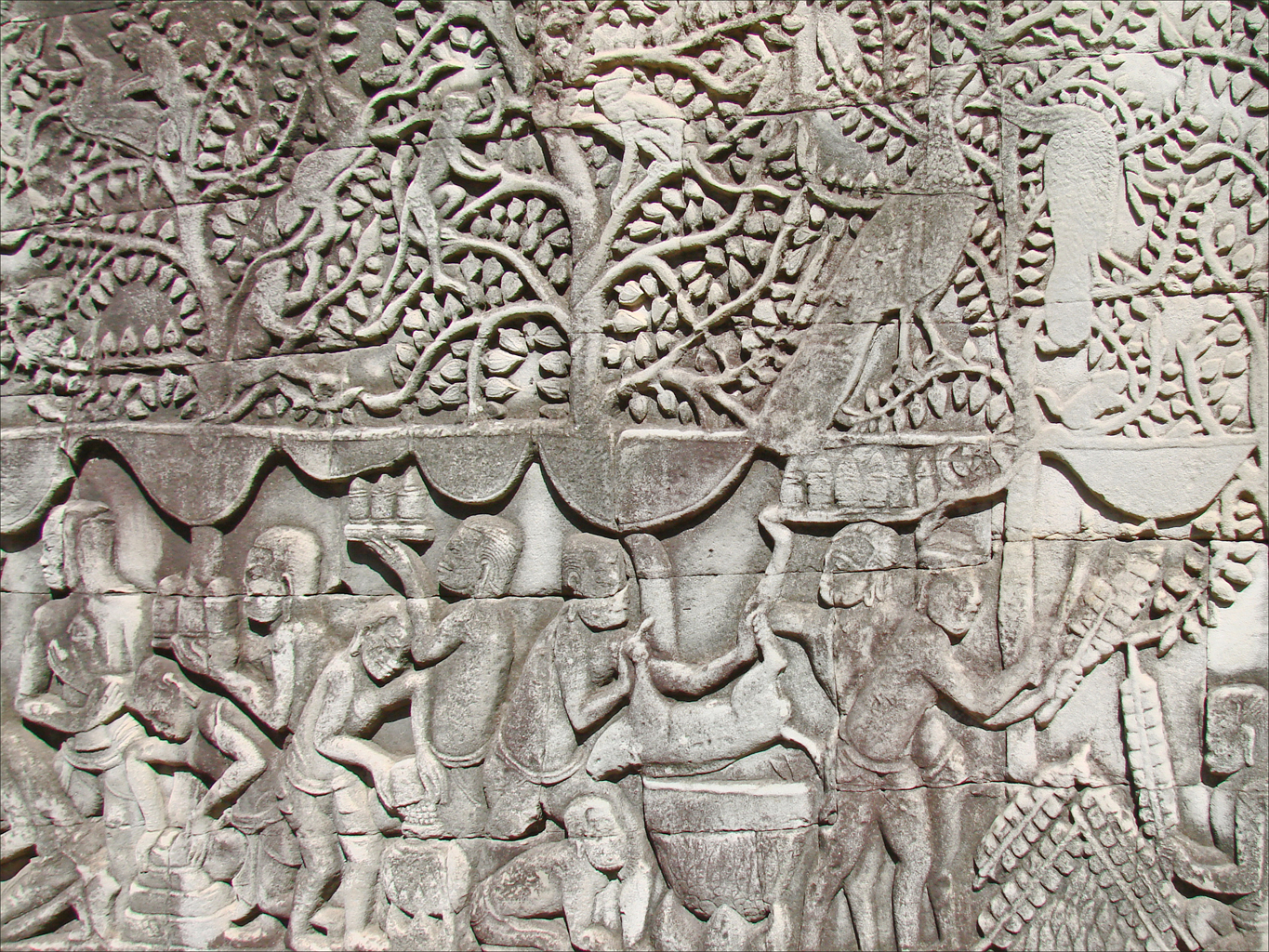

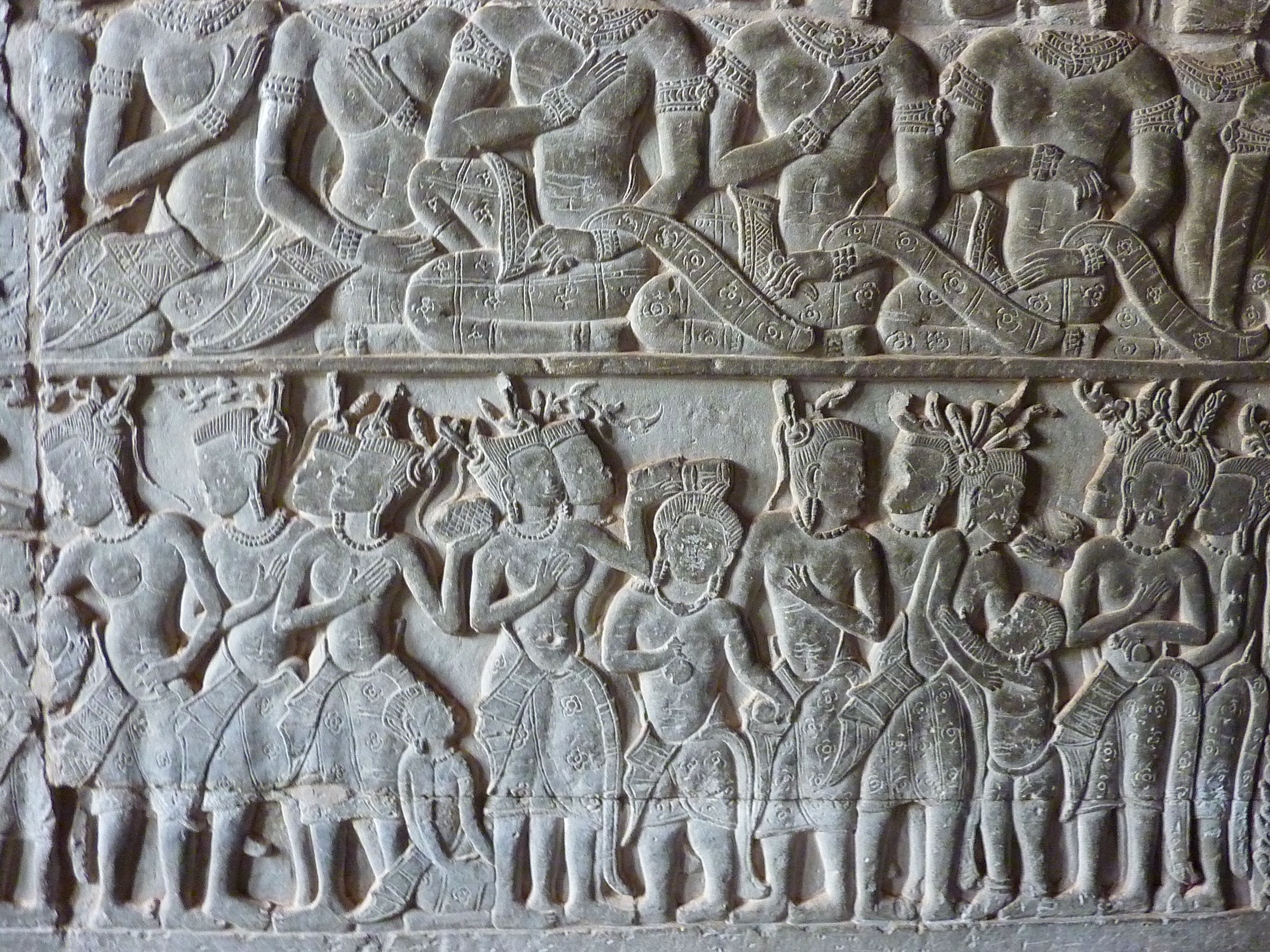

=== End of the Angkorian period ===
The end of the Angkorian period is generally set as around 1431, which some archaeologists used paleobotanical and stratigraphic data from core samples that were radiometrically carbon dated. They used this information to determine that the moat of Angkor Tom was not being used around this time, which means the site was in a decline. Over the year Angkor was sacked and looted by the Suphannaphum-Mon dynasty of Ayutthaya invaders, though the civilization had already been in decline in the 13th and 14th centuries. While the main cause of the decline is unknown, archaeologists believe it could have been due to environmental changes and constraint ability within the community of Angkor. During the course of the 15th century, nearly all of Angkor was abandoned, except for Angkor Wat, which remained a Buddhist shrine. Several theories have been advanced to account for the decline and abandonment of Angkor:

==== War with the Ayutthaya Kingdom ====
A map of the Khmer Empire (in red) in 900 AD

It is widely believed that the abandonment of the Khmer capital occurred as a result of Ayutthaya invasions. Ongoing civil wars with the Lavo-Khmer and Suphannaphum-Mon dynasty of Ayutthaya were already sapping the strength of Angkor at the time of Zhou Daguan toward the end of the 13th century. In his memoirs, Zhou reported that the country had been completely devastated by such a war, in which the entire population had been obligated to participate.

After the decline of Angkor in 1431, many statues were taken to the Ayutthaya capital of Ayutthaya in the west. Others departed for the new center of Khmer society at Longvek, southeast of Angkor in Kampong Tralach district. The official capital later moved, first in 1618 to Oudong around 45 kilometres (28 mi) from Phnom Penh in Ponhea Leu District, and eventually in 1865 to the present site of Phnom Penh.

==== Erosion of the state religion ====
Some scholars have connected the decline of Angkor with the conversion of the Khmer Empire to Theravada Buddhism following the reign of Jayavarman VII, arguing that this religious transition eroded the Hindu concept of kingship that underpinned the Angkorian civilization. According to Angkor scholar George Coedès, Theravada Buddhism's denial of the ultimate reality of the individual served to sap the vitality of the royal personality cult which had provided the inspiration for the grand monuments of Angkor. The vast expanse of temples required an equally large body of workers to maintain them; at Ta Prohm, a stone carving states that 12,640 people serviced that single temple complex. Not only could the spread of Buddhism have eroded this workforce, but it could have also affected the estimated 300,000 agricultural workers required to feed them all.

==== Neglect of public works ====
According to Coedès, the weakening of Angkor's royal government by ongoing war and the erosion of the cult of the devaraja undermined the government's ability to carry out important public works, such as the construction and maintenance of the waterways essential for irrigation of the rice fields upon which Angkor's large population depended for its sustenance. As a result, Angkorian civilization suffered from a reduced economic base, and the population was forced to scatter.

==== Natural disaster ====
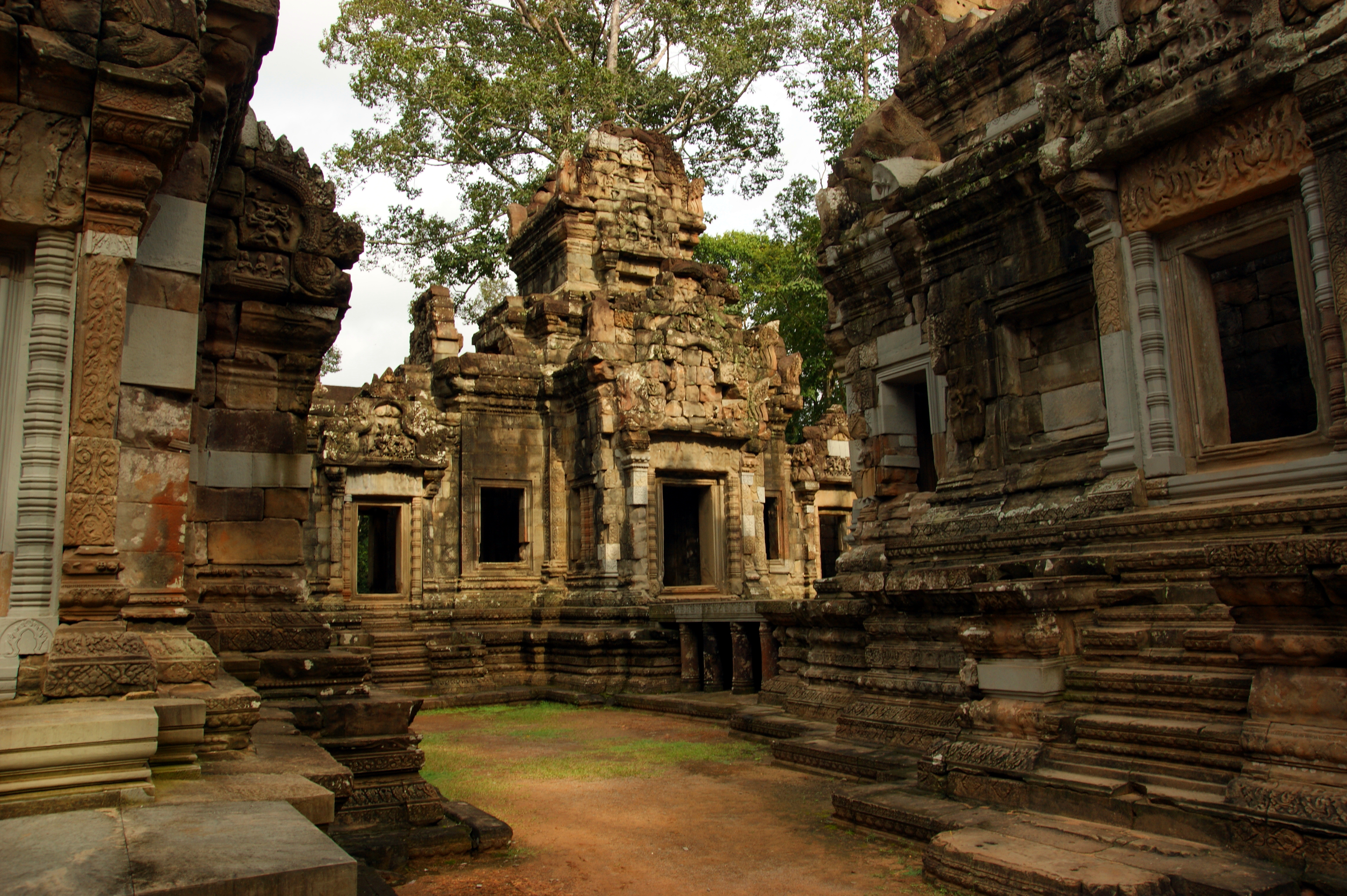
Chau Say Tevoda

Scholars who attempt to account for the rapid decline of Angkor have hypothesized natural disasters such as disease (Bubonic Plague), earthquakes, inundations, or drastic climate changes as the relevant agents of destruction. A study of tree rings in Vietnam produced a record of early monsoons that passed through this area. From this study, we can tell that during the 14th–15th centuries monsoons were weakened and eventually followed by extreme flooding. Their inability to adapt their flooding infrastructure may have led to its eventual decline.

Recent research by Australian archaeologists suggests that the decline may have been due to a shortage of water caused by the transition from the Medieval Warm Period to the Little Ice Age. LDEO dendrochronological research has established tree-ring chronologies indicating severe periods of drought across mainland Southeast Asia in the early 15th century, raising the possibility that Angkor's canals and reservoirs ran dry and ended expansion of available farmland.

=== Restoration, preservation, and threats ===
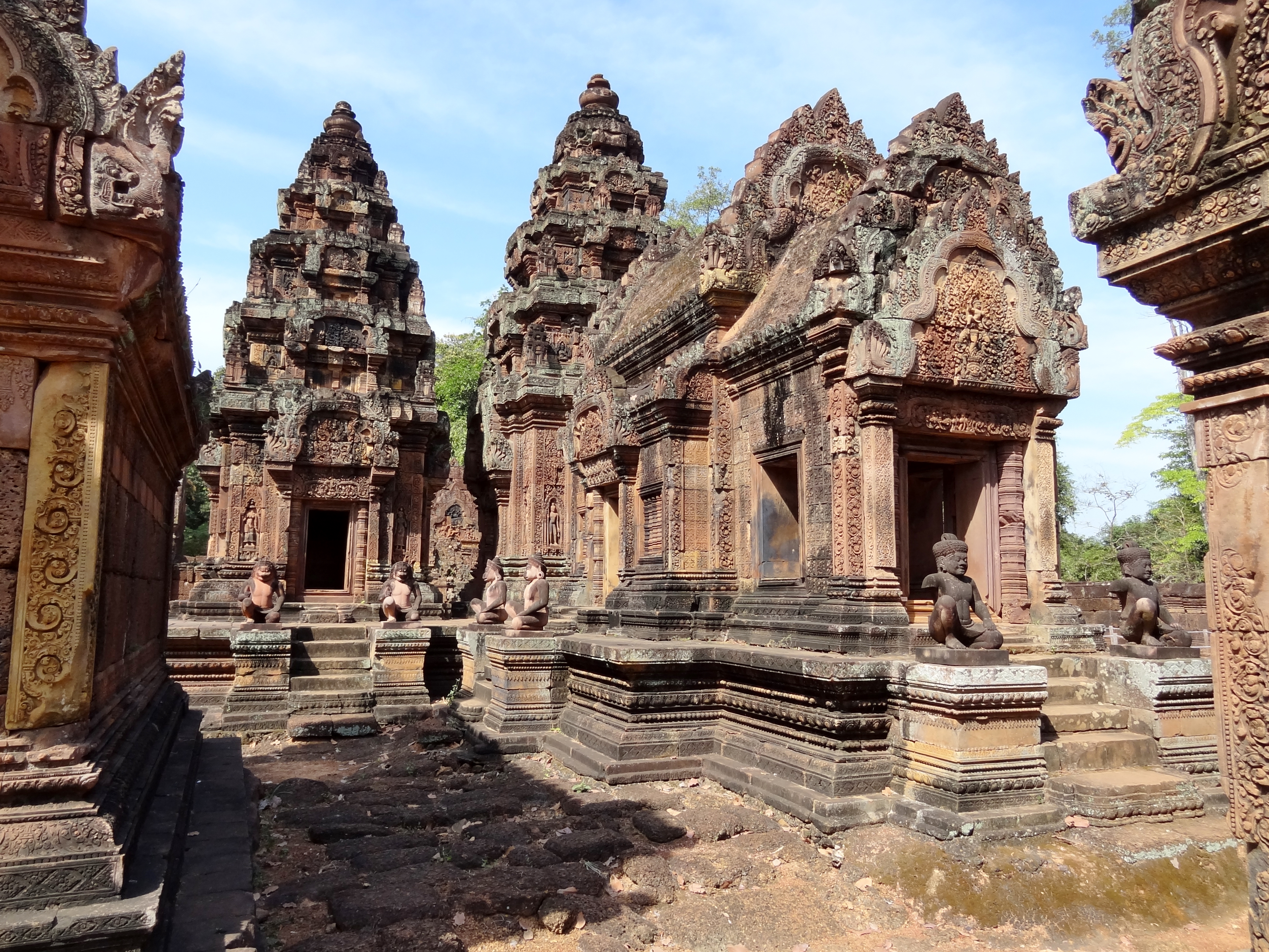
Banteay Srei

A 16th century Portuguese friar, António da Madalena, was the first recorded European visitor to visit Angkor Wat in 1586. By the 17th century, Angkor Wat was not completely abandoned. Fourteen inscriptions from the 17th century testify to Japanese settlements alongside those of the remaining Khmer. The best-known inscription tells of Ukondafu Kazufusa, who celebrated the Khmer New Year there in 1632.

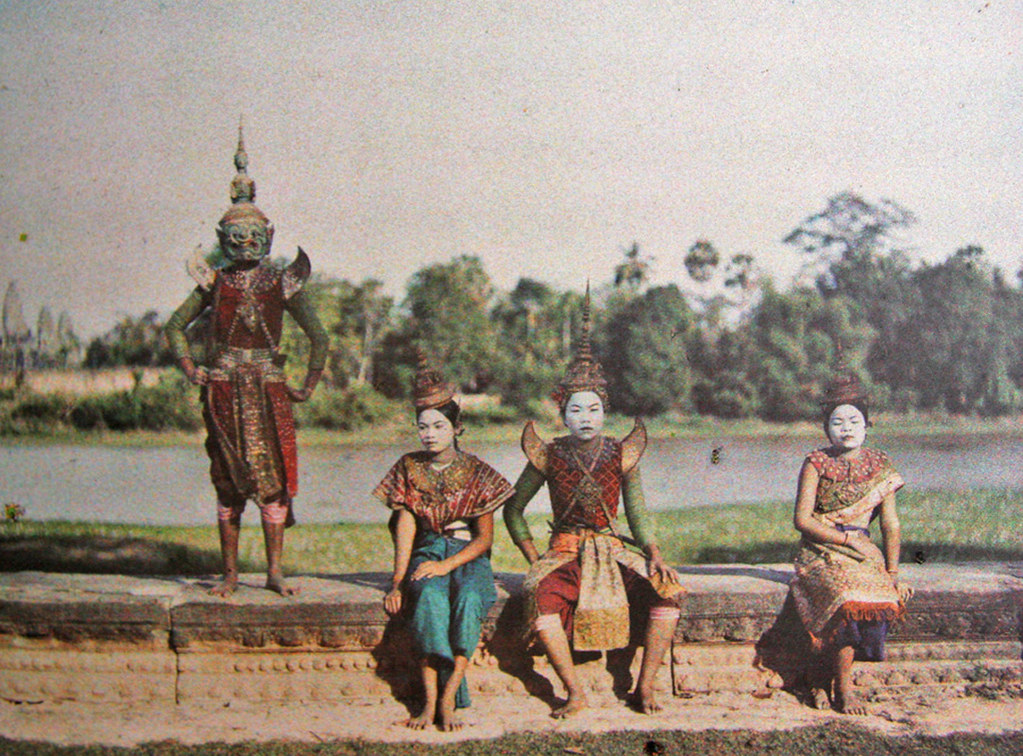
Apsara dancers by Angkor Wat in the early 20th century.

While Angkor was known to the local Khmer and was shown to European visitors Henri Mouhot in 1860 and Anna Leonowens in 1865. European archeologists such as Louis Delaporte and ethnologists such as Adolf Bastian visited the site and popularized it. This eventually led to a long restoration process by French archaeologists.

From 1907 to 1970, work was under the direction of the École française d'Extrême-Orient, which cleared away the forest, repaired foundations, and installed drains to protect the buildings from water damage. In addition, scholars associated with the school including George Coedès, Maurice Glaize, Paul Mus, Philippe Stern and others initiated a program of historical scholarship and interpretation that is fundamental to the current understanding of Angkor.

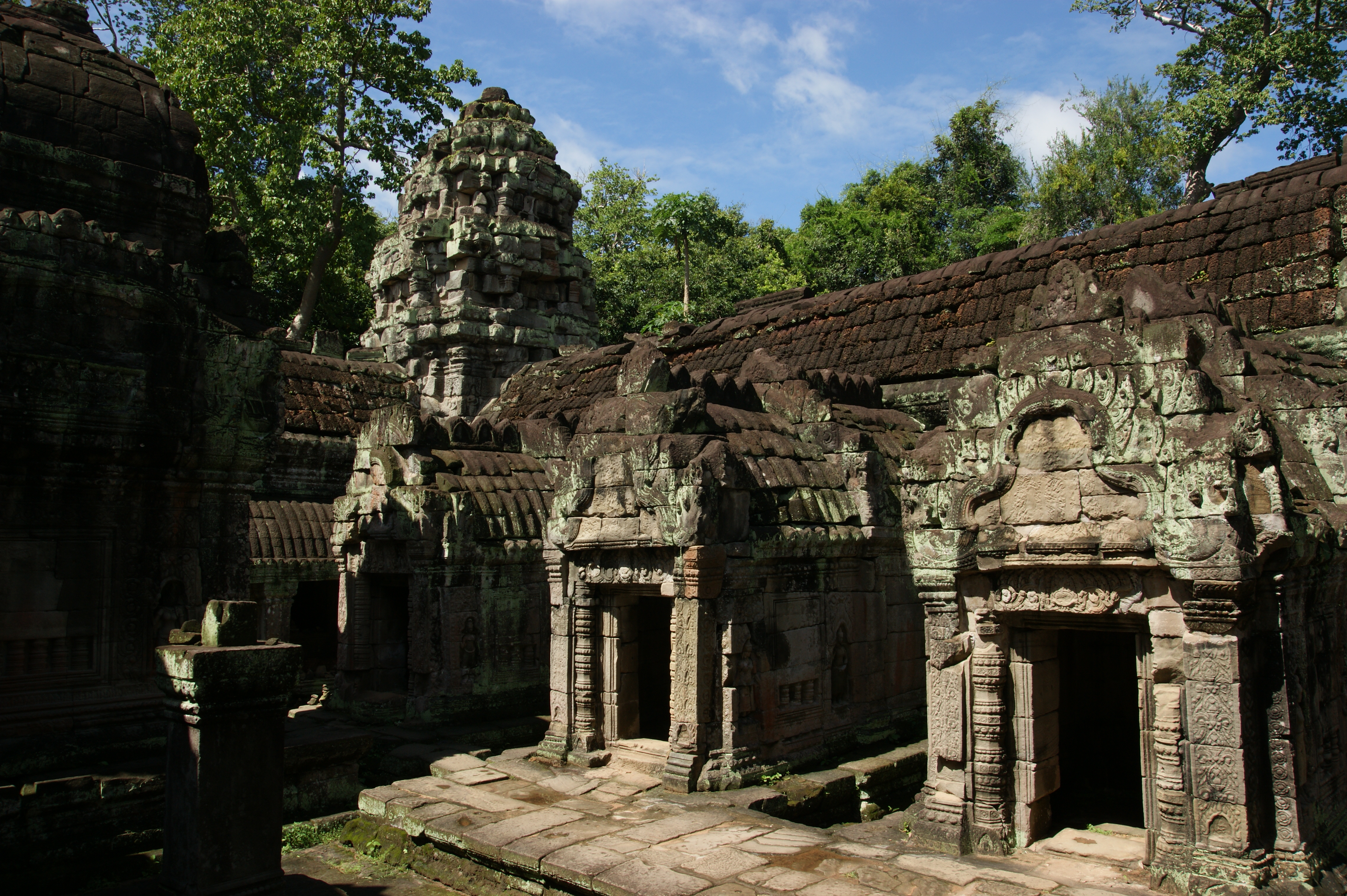
Preah Khan

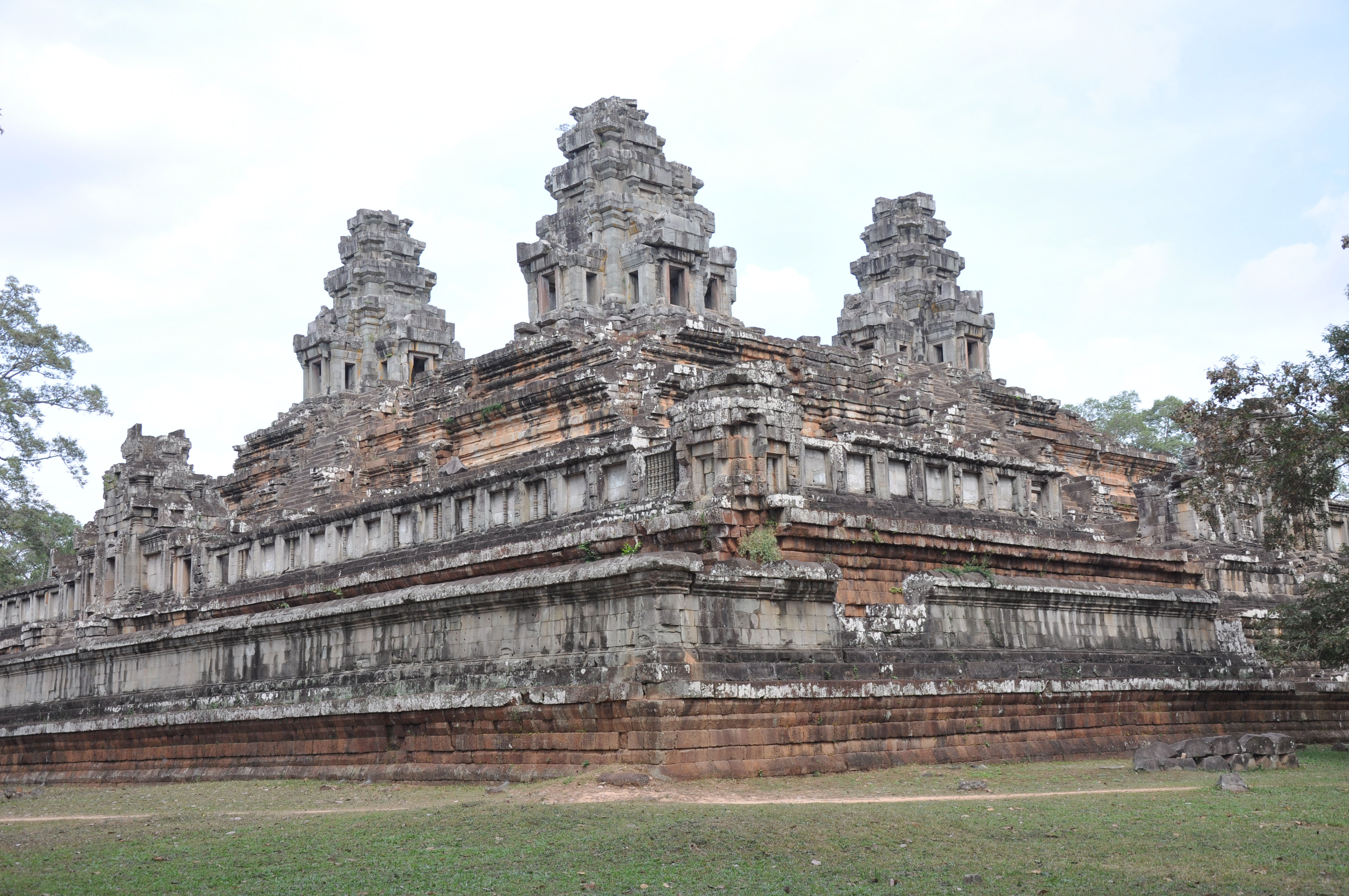
Ta Keo

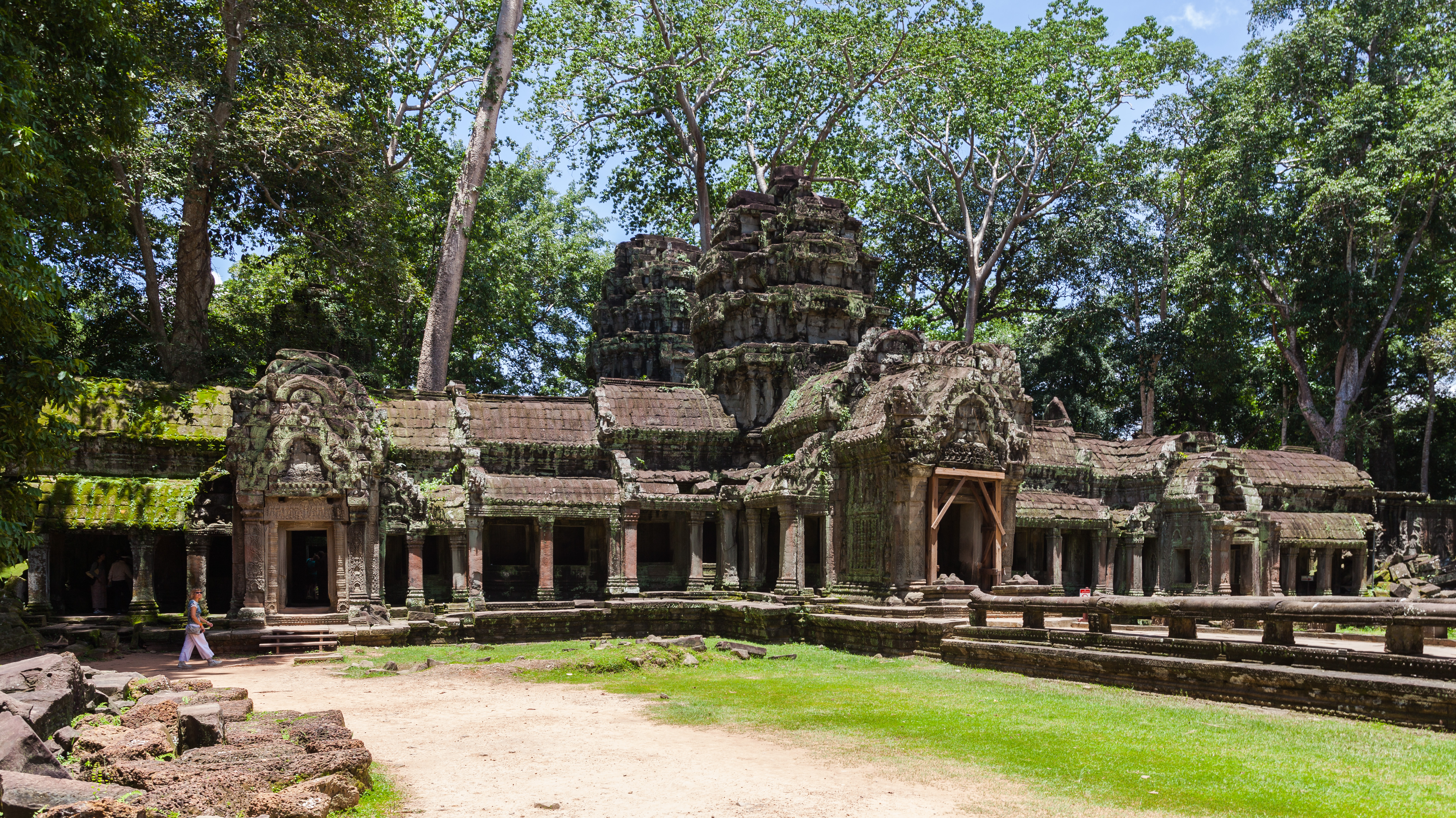
Ta Phrom

Work resumed after the end of the Cambodian Civil War and, since 1993, has been jointly co-ordinated by India, Germany, Japan and UNESCO through the International Co-ordinating Committee on the Safeguarding and Development of the Historic Site of Angkor (ICC), while Cambodian work is carried out by the Authority for the Protection and Management of Angkor and the Region of Siem Reap (APSARA) created in 1995. Some temples have been carefully taken apart stone by stone and reassembled on concrete foundations, in accordance with the method of anastylosis.

The World Monuments Fund has aided Preah Khan, the Churning of the Sea of Milk (a 49-meter-long bas-relief frieze in Angkor Wat), Ta Som, and Phnom Bakheng. International tourism to Angkor has increased significantly in recent years, with visitor numbers reaching around 2 million a year by 2014. This poses additional conservation problems but has also provided financial assistance to the restoration effort.

==== Water-table dropping ====
With the increased growth in tourism at Angkor, new hotels and restaurants are being built to accommodate such growth. Each new construction project drills underground to reach the water table, which has a limited storage capacity. This demand on the water table could undermine the stability of the sandy soils under the monuments at Angkor, leading to cracks, fissures and collapses. The peak tourist season corresponds with Cambodia's dry season, which leads to excessive pumping of ground water when it is least replenished naturally.

==== Looting ====
Looting was once a threat to the Angkor archaeological landscape. According to APSARA, the official Cambodian agency charged with overseeing the management of Angkor, commenting in 2005, "vandalism has multiplied at a phenomenal rate, employing local populations to carry out the actual thefts, heavily armed intermediaries transport objects, often in tanks or armored personnel carriers, often for sale across the Cambodian border.". Theft of archaeological objects has been greatly reduced in Cambodia since those comments were made.

==== Unsustainable tourism ====
The increasing number of tourists, around two million per year, exerts pressure on the archaeological sites at Angkor by walking and climbing on the (mostly) sandstone monuments at Angkor. This direct pressure created by unchecked tourism is expected to cause significant damage to the monuments in the future.

In sites such as Angkor, tourism is inevitable. Therefore, the site management team cannot exclusively manage the site. The team has to manage the flow of people. Millions of people visit Angkor each year, making the management of this flow vital to the quickly decaying structures. Western tourism to Angkor began in the 1970s, the sandstone monuments are not made for this type of heightened tourism.

Moving forward, UNESCO and local authorities at the site are in the process of creating a sustainable plan for the future of the site. Since 1992, UNESCO has moved towards conserving Angkor. Thousands of new archaeological sites have been discovered by UNESCO, and the organization has moved towards protected cultural zones. Two decades later, over 1000 people were employed full-time at the site for cultural sensitivity reasons. Part of this movement to limit the impacts of tourism has been to only open certain areas of the site.

However, much of the 1992 precautionary measures and calls for future enforcement have fallen through. Both globally and locally the policy-making has been successful, but the implementation has failed for several reasons. First, there are conflicts of interest in Cambodia. While the site is culturally important to them, Cambodia is a poverty-stricken country.

Tourism is a vital part to the Cambodian economy, so shutting down parts of Angkor, the largest tourist destination in the country, is not an option. A second reason stems from the government's inability to organize around the site. The Cambodian government has failed in organizing a robust team of cultural specialists and archaeologists to service the site.

== Religious history ==
Historical Angkor was more than a site for religious art and architecture. It was the site of vast cities that served all the needs of the Khmer people. Aside from a few old bridges, however, all of the remaining monuments are religious edifices. In Angkorian times, all non-religious buildings, including the residence of the king himself, were constructed with perishable materials, such as wood, "because only the gods had a right to residences made of stone". Similarly, the vast majority of the surviving stone inscriptions are about the religious foundations of kings and other potentates. As a result, it is easier to write the history of Angkorian state religion than it is to write that of just about any other aspect of Angkorian society.

Several religious movements contributed to the historical development of religion at Angkor:

- Indigenous religious cults mixed with Shaivism, including those centered on worship of the ancestors and of the lingam;
- A royal cult of personality, identifying the king with the deity, characteristic not only of Angkor, but of other Hindu civilizations in southeast Asia, such as Champa and Java;
- Hinduism, especially Shaivism, the form of Hinduism focused on the worship of Shiva and the lingam as the symbol of Shiva, but also Vaishnavism, the form of Hinduism focussed on the worship of Vishnu;
- Buddhism, in both its Mahayana and Theravada varieties.

=== Pre-Angkorian religion ===
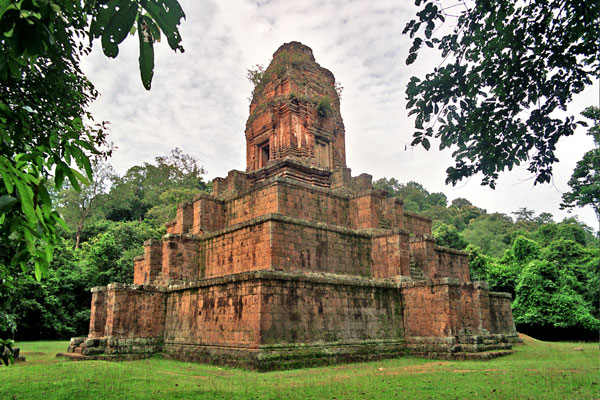
Dedicated by Rajendravarman in 948 AD, Baksei Chamkrong is a temple-pyramid that housed a statue of Shiva.

The religion of pre-Angkorian Cambodia, known to the Chinese as Funan (1st century AD to ca. 550) and Chenla (ca. 550 – ca. 800 AD), included elements of Hinduism, Buddhism and indigenous ancestor cults.

Temples from the period of Chenla bear stone inscriptions, in both Sanskrit and Khmer, naming both Hindu and local ancestral deities, with Shiva supreme among the former. The cult of Harihara was prominent; Buddhism was not, because, as reported by the Chinese pilgrim Yi Jing, a "wicked king" had destroyed it. Characteristic of the religion of Chenla also was the cult of the lingam, or stone phallus that patronized and guaranteed fertility to the community in which it was located.

=== Shiva and the lingam ===
The Khmer king Jayavarman II, whose assumption of power around 800 AD marks the beginning of the Angkorian period, established his capital at a place called Hariharalaya (today known as Roluos), at the northern end of the great lake, Tonlé Sap. Harihara is the name of a deity that combines the essence of Vishnu (Hari) with that of Shiva (Hara) and that was much favored by the Khmer kings. Jayavarman II's adoption of the epithet "devaraja" (god-king) signified the monarch's special connection with Shiva.

The beginning of the Angkorian period was also marked by changes in religious architecture. During the reign of Jayavarman II, the single-chambered sanctuaries typical of Chenla gave way to temples constructed as a series of raised platforms bearing multiple towers. Temple pyramids came to represent Mount Meru, the home of the Hindu gods, with the moats surrounding the temples representing the mythological oceans.

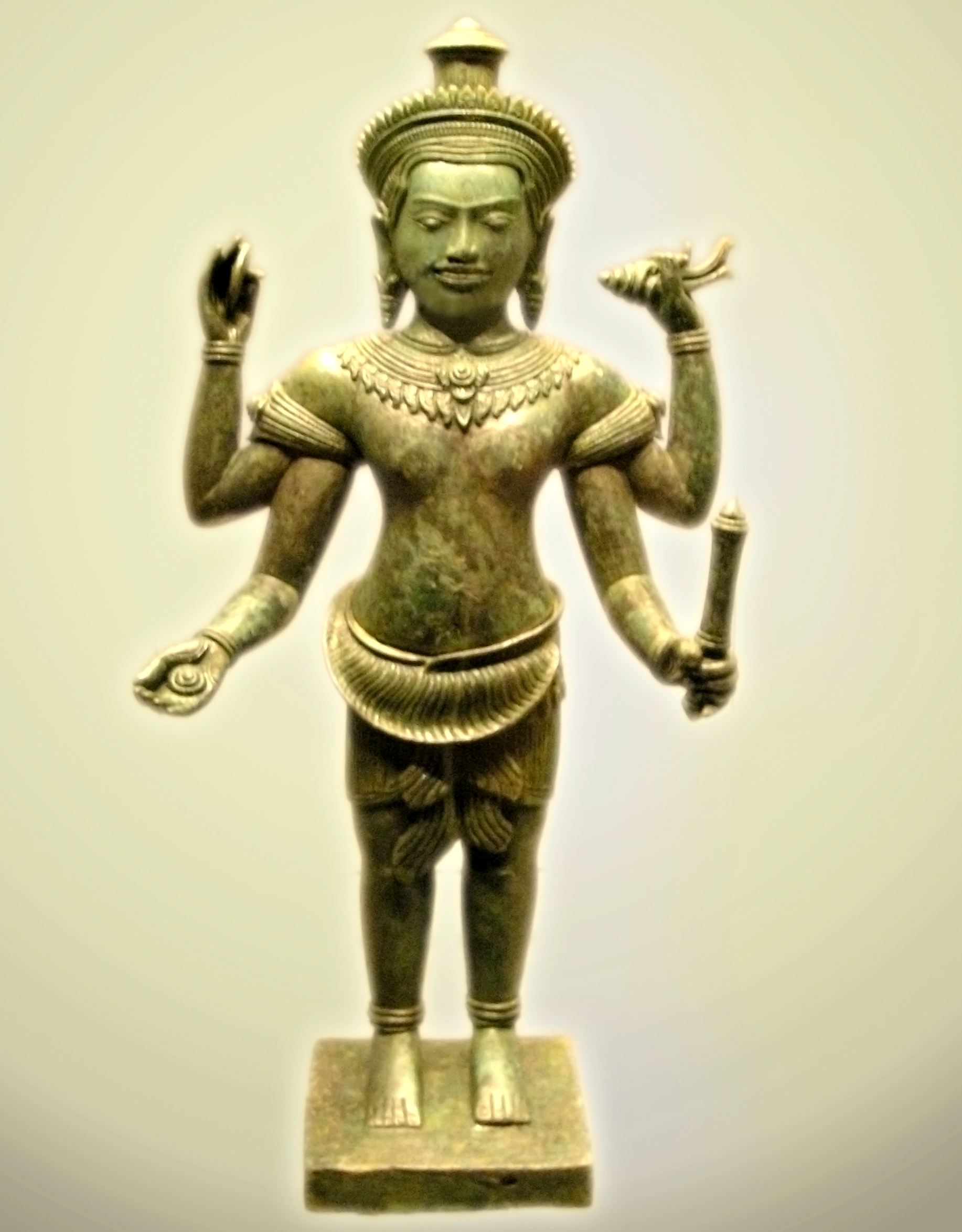
An 11th- or 12th-century Cambodian bronze statue of Vishnu

Typically, a lingam served as the central religious image of the Angkorian temple-mountain. The temple-mountain was the center of the city, and the lingam in the main sanctuary was the focus of the temple. The name of the central lingam was the name of the king himself, combined with the suffix -esvara, which designated Shiva. Through the worship of the lingam, the king was identified with Shiva, and Shaivism became the state religion.

Thus, an inscription dated 881 AD indicates that king Indravarman I erected a lingam named Indresvara. Another inscription tells us that Indravarman erected eight lingams in his courts and that they were named for the "eight elements of Shiva". Similarly, Rajendravarman, whose reign began in 944 AD, constructed the temple of Pre Rup, the central tower of which housed the royal lingam called Rajendrabhadresvara.

=== Vaishnavism ===
In the early days of Angkor, the worship of Vishnu was secondary to that of Shiva. The relationship seems to have changed with the construction of Angkor Wat by King Suryavarman II as his personal mausoleum at the beginning of the 12th century. The central religious image of Angkor Wat was an image of Vishnu, and an inscription identifies Suryavarman as "Paramavishnuloka", or "he who enters the heavenly world of Vishnu". Religious syncretism, however, remained thoroughgoing in Khmer society: the state religion of Shaivism was not necessarily abrogated by Suryavarman's turn to Vishnu, and the temple may well have housed a royal lingam.

Furthermore, the turn to Vaishnavism did not abrogate the royal personality cult of Angkor, by which the reigning king was identified with the deity. According to Angkor scholar Georges Coedès, "Angkor Wat is, if you like, a vaishnavite sanctuary, but the Vishnu venerated there was not the ancient Hindu deity nor even one of the deity's traditional incarnations, but the king Suryavarman II posthumously identified with Vishnu, consubstantial with him, residing in a mausoleum decorated with the graceful figures of apsaras just like Vishnu in his celestial palace". Suryavarman proclaimed his identity with Vishnu, just as his predecessors had claimed consubstantiation with Shiva.

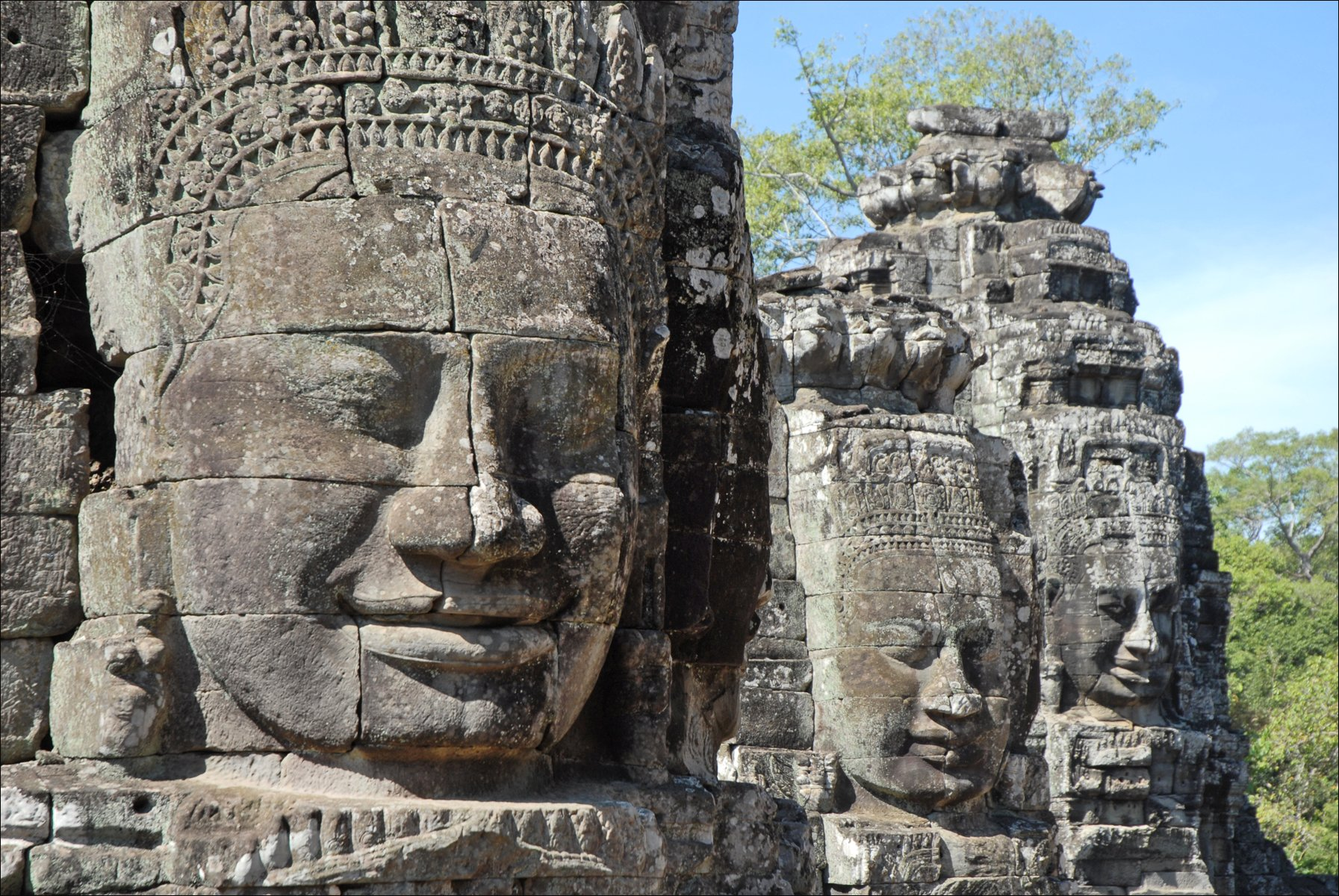
Face towers of the Bayon represent the king as the Bodhisattva Lokesvara.

=== Mahayana Buddhism ===
In the last quarter of the 12th century, King Jayavarman VII departed radically from the tradition of his predecessors when he adopted Mahayana Buddhism as his personal faith. Jayavarman also made Buddhism the state religion of his kingdom which was Angkor Thom, built inside the city of Angkor. He constructed the Buddhist temple known as the Bayon at the heart of his new capital. In the face towers of the Bayon, the king represented himself as the bodhisattva Avalokiteshvara moved by compassion for his subjects. Thus, Jayavarman was able to perpetuate the royal personality cult of Angkor, while identifying the divine component of the cult with the bodhisattva rather than with Shiva.

=== Hindu restoration ===
The Hindu restoration began around 1243 AD, with the death of Jayavarman VII's successor, Indravarman II. The next king, Jayavarman VIII, was a Shaivite iconoclast who specialized in destroying Buddhist images and in reestablishing the Hindu shrines that his illustrious predecessor had converted to Buddhism. During the restoration, the Bayon was made a temple to Shiva, and its central 3.6-meter-tall (12 ft) statue of the Buddha was cast to the bottom of a nearby well. Everywhere, cultist statues of the Buddha were replaced by lingams.

=== Religious pluralism ===
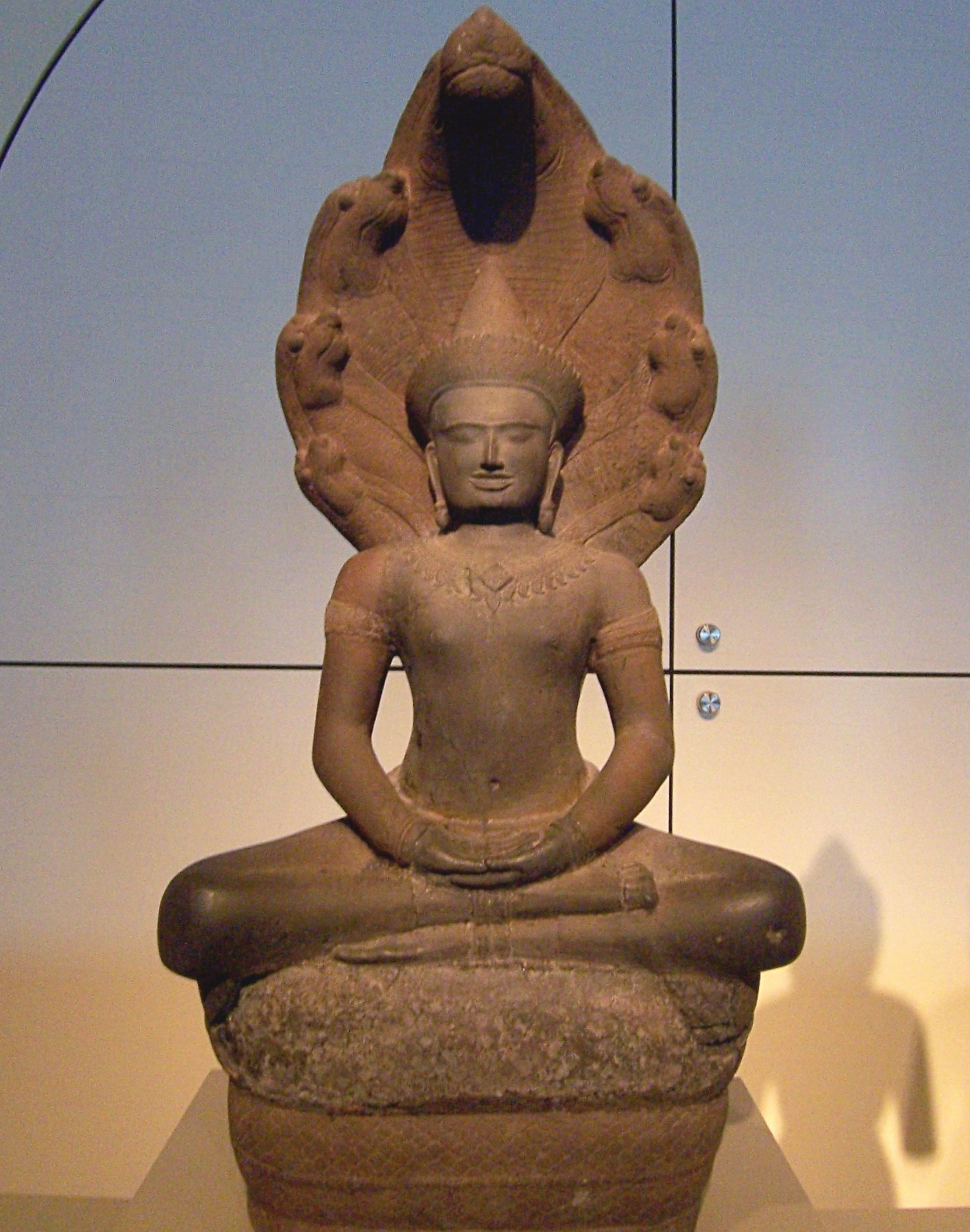
A statue of the Buddha, shielded by the Naga Mucalinda, from 12th century

When Chinese traveller Zhou Daguan came to Angkor in AD 1296, he found what he took to be three separate religious groups. The dominant religion was that of Theravada Buddhism. Zhou observed that the monks had shaven heads and wore yellow robes. The Buddhist temples impressed Zhou with their simplicity. He noted that the images of Buddha were made of gilded plaster.

The other two groups identified by Zhou appear to have been those of the Brahmans and of the Shaivites. About the Brahmans, Zhou had little to say, except that they were often employed as high officials. Of the Shaivites, whom he called "Taoists", Zhou wrote, "the only image which they revere is a block of stone analogous to the stone found in shrines of the god of the soil in China".

=== Theravada Buddhism ===
During the course of the 13th century, Theravada Buddhism transmitted through the Mon kingdoms of Dvaravati and Haripunchai made its appearance at Angkor. Gradually, it became the dominant religion of Cambodia, displacing both Mahayana Buddhism and Shaivism. The practice of Theravada Buddhism at Angkor continues until this day.

== Archaeological sites ==
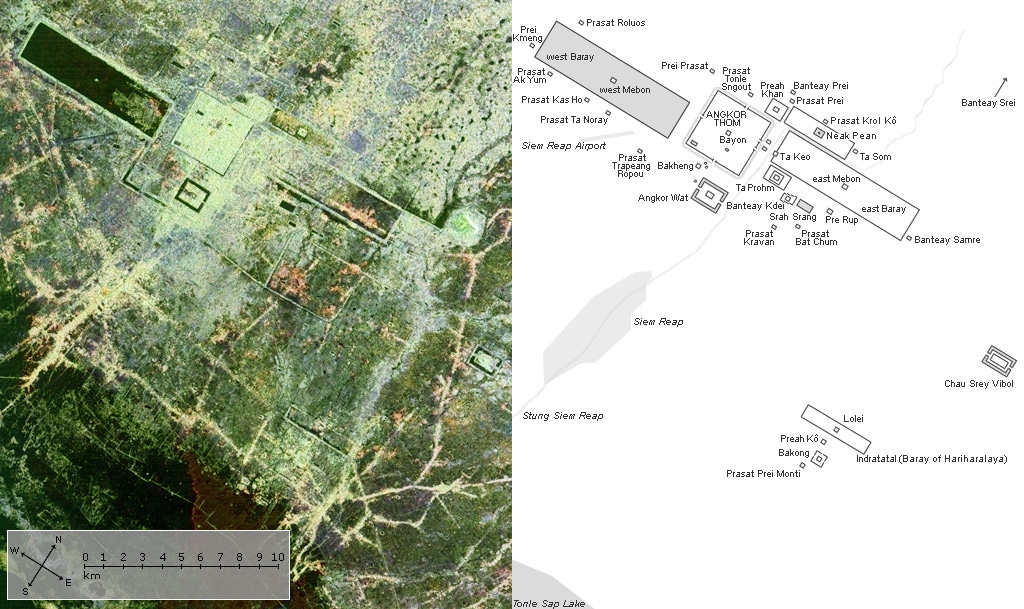
A satellite image and a map of Angkor

The area of Angkor has many significant archaeological sites, including the following:

- Angkor Thom
- Angkor Wat
- Baksei Chamkrong
- Banteay Kdei
- Banteay Samré
- Banteay Srei
- Baphuon
- the Bayon.
- Chau Say Tevoda
- East Baray
- East Mebon
- Kbal Spean
- the Khleangs.
- Krol Ko
- Lolei
- Neak Pean
- Phimeanakas
- Phnom Bakheng
- Phnom Krom
- Prasat Ak Yum
- Prasat Kravan
- Preah Khan
- Preah Ko
- Preah Palilay
- Preah Pithu
- Pre Rup
- Spean Thma
- Srah Srang
- Ta Nei
- Ta Prohm
- Ta Som
- Ta Keo
- Terrace of the Elephants
- Terrace of the Leper King
- Thommanon
- West Baray
- West Mebon
- Another city at Mahendraparvata was discovered in 2013.

== Notable people ==
- Jayavarman VII - Khmer Empire king
- Yasovarman I - King

== Terms and phrases ==
- Angkor (អង្គរ ângkôr) is a Khmer word meaning "city". It is a corrupted form of nôkôr (នគរ) which derives from the Sanskrit nagara.
- Banteay (បន្ទាយ bântéay) is a Khmer term meaning "citadel" or "fortress" that is also applied to walled temples.
- Baray (បារាយណ៍ baréayn) literally means "open space" or "wide plain" but in Khmer architecture refers to an artificial reservoir.
- Esvara or Isvara (ईश्वर्)(ឥស្វរៈ ĕsvâreă/ឦស្សរៈ eisvâreă) is a Sansriti term meaning "god".
- Gopura (गोपुर) is a Sanskrit term meaning "entrance pavilion" or "gateway".
- Jaya (ជយ chôy/ជ័យ choăy) is a prefix derived from Sanskrit meaning "victory".
- Phnom (ភ្នំ phnum) is a Khmer word meaning "mountain".
- Prasat (ប្រាសាទ prasat) is a Khmer term derived from Sanskrit prāsāda and usually meaning "monument" or "palace" and, by extension, "ancient temple".
- Preah (ព្រះ preăh) is a Khmer term meaning "God", "King" or "exalted". It can also be a prefix meaning "sacred" or "holy". Derived from Sanskrit vara (Preah Khan means "sacred sword").
- Srei (ស្រី srei) is a Khmer term with two possible meanings. Derived from Sanskrit strī it means "woman", derived from Sanskrit sirī it means "beauty", "splendor" or "glory".
- Ta (តា ta) is a Khmer word meaning "grandfather," or under some circumstances "ancestor" (Ta Prohm means "Ancestor Brahma". Neak ta means "ancestors" or "ancestral spirits").
- Thom (ធំ thum) is a Khmer word meaning "large" (Angkor Thom means "large city").
- Varman (វរ្ម័ន vôrmoăn) is a suffix, from Sanskrit varman, meaning "shield" or "protector" (Suryavarman means "protected by Surya, the sun-god").
- Wat (វត្ត vôtt) is a Khmer word, derived from the Pali वत्त, vatta, meaning (Buddhist) "temple" (Angkor Wat means "temple city").

== See also ==
- List of World Heritage Sites in Cambodia
- Angkor National Museum
- Culture of Cambodia
- Funan
- Hindu temple architecture
- Greater India

== Bibliography ==
- Audric, John (1972). Angkor and the Khmer Empire. London: R. Hale. ISBN 0-7091-2945-9.
- Chandler, David (1992). A History of Cambodia. Boulder: Westview Press.
- Coedès, George (1943). Pour mieux comprendre Angkor. Hanoi: Imprimerie d'Extrême Orient.
- Coedès, George (1968) [1964]. Walter F. Vella (ed.). The Indianized states of Southeast Asia. Translated by Susan Brown Cowing. Honolulu: University of Hawaii Press. ISBN 978-0-8248-0368-1. Archived from the original on 23 January 2023.
- Dickason, Deane (1939). Wondrous Angkor. Shanghai: Kelly & Walsh Limited.
- Forbes, Andrew; Henley, David (2011). Angkor, Eighth Wonder of the World. Chiang Mai: Cognoscenti Books. ASIN: B0085RYW0O
- Freeman, Michael; Jacques, Claude (1999). Ancient Angkor. Trumbull, Conn.: Weatherhill. ISBN 0-8348-0426-3.
- Higham, Charles (1989). The Archaeology of Mainland Southeast Asia. Cambridge University Press. ISBN 0-521-27525-3.
- Higham, Charles (2001). The Civilization of Angkor. Berkeley / Weidenfeld & Nicolson: University of California Press / London. ISBN 978-1-84212-584-7.
- Higham, Charles (2014). Early Mainland Southeast Asia. Bangkok: River Books Co. ISBN 978-616-7339-44-3.
- Petrotchenko, Michel (2014). Focusing on the Angkor Temples: The Guidebook, 383 pages, Amarin Printing and Publishing, 3rd edition, ISBN 978 616 361 118 5
- Stern, Philippe (1934). "Le temple-montagne khmèr, le culte du linga et le Devaraja". Bulletin de l'École française d'Extrême-Orient. 34 (2): 611–616. doi:10.3406/befeo.1934.4983. JSTOR 43733047.
- "In Pol Pot Land: Ruins of varying types". National Review. 55 (18). 29 September 2003. Archived from the original on 27 December 2004 – via FindArticles.
- UNESCO: International Programme for the Preservation of Angkor Archived 9 October 2012 at the Wayback Machine Accessed 17 May 2005.
- "Climate change killed ancient city". The Australian. 14 March 2007. Archived from the original on 24 March 2007.
- Smith, Justine (25 February 2007). "Tourist invasion threatens to ruin glories of Angkor". The Observer. London. Archived from the original on 16 March 2007.
- Dayton, Leigh (14 August 2007). "Angkor engineered own end". The Australian. Archived from the original on 10 September 2007.
- "Map reveals ancient urban sprawl". BBC News. 14 August 2007. Archived from the original on 28 October 2007.
- Pescali, Piergiorgio (2010). Indocina. Bologna: Emil. ISBN 978-88-96026-42-7.
- Wager, Jonathan (1995). "Environmental planning for a world heritage site: Case study of Angkor, Cambodia". Journal of Environmental Planning & Management. 38 (3): 319–434. Bibcode:1995JEPM...38..419W. doi:10.1080/09640569512959.
