= List of non-governmental organizations in China =

This article is a list of domestic and international non-governmental organizations (NGOs) operating in China.

== Overview ==
Relations between Chinese NGOs and the government fluctuate over time. Most Chinese NGOs and activists work with government entities that support their goals and selectively oppose government entities which contest their goals. Academic Jing Wang describes many Chinese NGOs as engaged in a "nonconfrontational activism" and existing in a "gray zone between the legitimate and the illegitimate."

== List ==
=== A ===
- Academy for Educational Development
- ActionAid
- Adventist Development and Relief Agency China
- AFS Intercultural Exchanges
- All Girls Allowed
- American Bar Association
- American Friends Service Committee
- AmeriCares Foundation
- ANESVAD (Acción Sanitaria y Desarollo Social)
- Animals Asia Foundation
- Australian Volunteers International

=== B ===
- Bill and Melinda Gates Foundation
- Blacksmith Institute
- Blue Moon Fund
- BN Vocational School
- Braille Without Borders
- Bremen Overseas Research and Development Association

=== C ===
- Canadian Co-operative Association
- Caritas Hong Kong
- Chi Heng Foundation
- Children in Crisis
- China Care Foundation
- China Foundation for Poverty Alleviation
- China Youth Development Foundation
- Christian Blind Mission International
- Conservation International

=== D ===
- DKT International

=== E ===
- European Union Chamber of Commerce in China

=== F ===
- Family Health International
- Fauna and Flora International
- Forest Stewardship Council
- Friedrich Ebert Stiftung
- Friends of the Earth Hong Kong
- Friends of Nature

=== G ===
- Global Environmental Institute
- Global Greengrants Fund
- Golden Bridges
- Good Food Fund
- Greenpeace East Asia
- Green Camel Bell
- Guizhou Rural Tourism Development Center

=== H ===
- Harvard Summit for Young Leaders in China
- Habitat for Humanity International
- Handicap International (Belgium)
- Hanns-Seidel-Foundation
- Health Unlimited
- Heart to Heart Community Care
- Heart to Heart International
- Heifer Project International
- Heinrich Böll Foundation
- Helen Keller International (海伦凯勒国际基金会)
- HelpAge International
- Himalaya Foundation
- Holt China Children's Services
- Hope International

=== I ===
- IFChina Original Studio
- Institute of Contemporary Observation
- Institute of International Education
- Institute for Sustainable Communities
- International Bridges to Justice
- International Development Enterprises
- International Fund for Animal Welfare
- International Institute of Rural Reconstruction
- International Republican Institute
- Islamic Relief

=== K ===
- Kadoorie Farm and Botanic Garden
- Konrad Adenauer Stiftung
- Korean Federation for Environmental Movement

=== L ===
- Li Ka Shing Foundation
- Lifeline Express
- Lions Club

=== M ===
- Marie Stopes International China Programme
- Médecins du Monde
- Médecins Sans Frontières
- Mennonite Central Committee
- Mercy Corps International
- Muslim Hands

=== N ===
- National Committee on US-China Relations
- National Democratic Institute for International Affairs
- National Endowment for Democracy
- Natural Resources Defense Council
- New Zealand China Friendship Society
- NGO2.0

=== O ===
- Operation Blessing
- Operation Smile
- Opportunity International
- ORBIS International
- OXFAM Hong Kong

=== P ===
- Pacific Environment
- Pacific Regional Environment Programme
- People's Solidarity for Participatory Democracy
- Plan International
- Population Services International
- Princeton-in-Asia
- PATH
- Project Hope
- ProLiteracy Worldwide

=== R ===
- Red Cross and Red Crescent Societies
  - International Federation
  - American
  - Australian
  - Hong Kong
- Rockefeller Brothers Fund
- Royal London Society for the Blind
- Royal Society for Prevention of Cruelty to Animals

=== S ===
- Save China's Tigers
- Save the Children
- Sea Turtles 911
- Seva Foundation
- Silence (龍耳)
- Silver Lining Foundation
- Singapore International Foundation
- Shanghai Young Bakers
- Smile Angel Foundation
- Smile Train
- SOS Kinderdorf
- Special Olympics East Asia
- Starr Foundation

=== T ===
- The Library Project
- Television Trust for the Environment
- The Terma Foundation
- The Asia Foundation
- The Boys' and Girls' Clubs Association of Hong Kong
- The Carter Center (CBM International)
- The David and Lucile Packard Foundation
- The Ford Foundation
- The Fred Hollows Foundation
- The Hong Kong Council of Social Service
- The International HIV/AIDS Alliance
- The Jane Goodall Institute (Roots & Shoots)
- John D. and Catherine T. MacArthur Foundation
- The Mountain Institute
- The Nature Conservancy
- The Salvation Army
- The World Conservation Union (IUCN)

=== V ===
- Voluntary Service Overseas
- Volunteers in Asia

=== W ===
- Wetlands International - China Programme
- WildAid
- Wildlife Conservation Society
- William J. Clinton Foundation
- Wheelchair Foundation
- Wokai
- World Monuments Fund
- World Vision International
- World Wide Fund for Nature

=== Y ===
- Yale-China Association
- YMCA of Hong Kong
- Youth For Understanding (YFU China)
- Yunnan Institute of Development

=== Z ===
- The Zigen Fund

== See also ==
- List of charities in the People's Republic of China
