= List of charities in China =

This article is a list of domestic and international charities operating in China.

== List ==
- Box of Hope
- Habitat for Humanity China
- Heart to Heart Community Care
- Heifer International
- Jane Goodall Institute China
- Love Without Boundaries
- One Foundation
- Operation Smile
- Red Cross Society of China
- Rotary Club of Shanghai
- Smile Angel Foundation
- SOS Children's Villages
- The Smile Train
- UNICEF
- Wheelchair Foundation
- Pfrang Association

== See also ==
- Charitable contribution
- Charitable organization
- Charity fraud
- List of non-governmental organizations in the People's Republic of China
