= Jing Wang =

Jing Wang may refer to:

- Wang Jing (disambiguation), a list of people with the surname Wang
- King Jing (disambiguation), Zhou dynasty monarchs
- Jing Wang (professor), professor of Chinese media and cultural studies
