= Wang Jin =

Wang Jin is the name of:

- Wang Jin (Tang dynasty) (700–781), Tang dynasty chief councilor
- John Baptist Wang Jin (1924–2014), Chinese Roman Catholic bishop
- Wang Jin (archaeologist) (1926–2020), Chinese archaeologist
- Jing Wang (professor) (1950–2021), also known as Wang Jin, Taiwan-born professor of Chinese Language & Culture at Massachusetts Institute of Technology, US
- Wang Jin (film producer) (born 1980), Chinese film producer
- Wang Jin (film director) (born 1947), Chinese film- and television director

== Sportspeople ==
- Wang Jin (archer) (born 1960), Chinese archer
- Wang Jin (judoka) (born 1972), Chinese judoka
- Wang Jin (skier) (born 1997), Chinese freestyle skier

== See also ==
- Wangjin, a traditional East Asian headgear
- Wang Jing (disambiguation)
- Jin Wang (disambiguation)
