= GCB =

GCB may refer to:

- Gaming control board
- GCB (TV series), American television series
- GCB (McDonald's), a Malaysian product of McDonald's
- GCB Bank, formerly Ghana Commercial Bank
- Generator circuit breaker
- Gilmore City–Bradgate Community School District
- Giro Commercial Bank, a defunct commercial bank in Kenya
- Global Corruption Barometer
- Gloucestershire Cricket Board, in England
- Glucocerebrosidase, enzyme
- (Dame or Knight) Grand Cross of the Order of the Bath
- Great Calcite Belt, a large region of the ocean with high concentrations of calcite
- Green Camel Bell, Chinese environmental organization
- Groupe Communiste Burkinabè, defunct political party of Burkina Faso
- Guides Catholiques de Belgique, French-speaking Belgian Girl Guiding organization
