= Alpha Sigma Rho =

Asian American service college sorority

- ΑΣΡ
- Founded: April 2, 1998; 28 years ago University of Georgia
- Type: Social
- Affiliation: NAPA
- Status: Active
- Emphasis: Asian-American unity
- Scope: National
- Motto: "Strength in Unity"
- Pillars: Academic Excellence, Interpersonal Growth, Moral Development, and Strength in Unity
- Colors: Red, White, and Silver
- Symbol: 女 ("Nu", the Chinese symbol for "woman")
- Flower: Calla lily
- Jewel: Opal
- Mascot: Swan
- Philanthropy: National Ovarian Cancer Coalition
- Chapters: 13
- Nickname: Alpha Sigs, ASR
- Headquarters: Athens, Georgia; United States
- Website: www.alphasigmarho.org

Alpha Sigma Rho (ΑΣΡ), also known as Alpha Sigs, ASR, and Lovely Ladies in Red, is an American Asian-interest, but not exclusive, social sorority founded in 1998 at the University of Georgia in Athens, Georgia. Alpha Sigma Rho was the first Asian-interest sorority established in the state of Georgia.

== History ==
Alpha Sigma Rho was founded as an Asian interest sorority in 1998 by twelve women at the University of Georgia in Athens, Georgia. Its founders are collectively referred to as the "founding mothers". The founding mothers are Irene Chien, Sandra Chu, Young Jeon, Debbie Kwon, Angela Lu, Lynn Nguyen, Anne See, Anna Suh, Juliette Taylor, Jessica Yoo, Suzanne Yoo, and Jasmine Yu.

Sigma Rho was the first Asian-interest sorority established in the state of Georgia. The sorority has spread to universities in Maryland, Ohio, Pennsylvania, Texas and Virginia.

== Symbols ==
Sigma Rho's motto is "Strength in Unity". It is based on the principles or pillars of academic excellence, interpersonal growth, moral development, and strength in unity.

The founding mothers adopted symbols for the sorority. Its flower is the calla lily and its mascot is the swan. The sorority's colors are red, silver, and white. Its gemstone is the opal. Its symbol is Nu, the Chinese symbol for woman.

Its nicknames are Alpha Sigs and ASR.

== Membership ==
Applicants may seek membership as college undergraduates or as graduate students. Membership is open to those who meet the requirements, regardless of race, nationality, religion, and several other factors.

== Philanthropy ==
On a national level, the sorority is pledged to support the National Ovarian Cancer Coalition. The sorority's various chapters work with their local Asian-interest philanthropic organizations to help them with fundraising and publicity. These include China Care, Austin Children's Services, and Circle of Sisterhood.

== Chapters ==
Following are the chapters of Alpha Sigma Rho, with active chapters indicated in bold and inactive chapters in italics.

Chapter	Charter date and range	Institution	Location	Status	Ref.
**Alpha**	April 2, 1998	University of Georgia	Athens, Georgia	Active	
**Beta**	2000	University of Texas at Austin	Austin, Texas	Active	
Gamma	2002–2003	Georgia Tech	Atlanta, Georgia	Inactive	
**Delta**	2007	University of Texas at San Antonio	San Antonio, Texas	Active	
**Epsilon**	2007	Temple University	Philadelphia, Pennsylvania	Active	
**Zeta**	2015	Towson University	Towson, Maryland	Active	
Eta	2016–2020	Denison University	Granville, Ohio	Inactive	
**Theta**	2018	University of South Carolina	Columbia, South Carolina	Active	
**Iota**	2019	Texas Tech University	Lubbock, Texas	Active	
**Kappa**	2019	Montclair State University	Montclair, New Jersey	Active	
**Lambda**	2020	University of Pittsburgh	Pittsburgh, Pennsylvania	Active	
**Mu**	2020	Texas State University	San Marcos, Texas	Active	
**Nu**	2022	Georgia State University	Atlanta, Georgia	Active	
**Xi**	2024	George Mason University	Fairfax, Virginia	Active	

== See also ==
- List of Asian American fraternities and sororities
- List of social sororities and women's fraternities
- Cultural interest fraternities and sororities
