= GEI =

GEI may refer to:

- Gebe language
- Gei (Lala Hsu album)
- Gei Zantzinger (1936–2007), American filmmaker
- Global Entrepreneurship Index
- Global Environmental Institute
- Gross enrolment ratio
- Grup Especial d'Intervenció (GEI)
