= Terma =

Terma can refer to:

- Terma (religion), traditions of revelation in Tibetan Buddhism, Bön and the Greater Himalayan region
- "Terma" (The X-Files), an episode of The X-Files
- Terma A/S, a Danish company
- Terma Foundation, American charity working in Tibet
