= Wang Jing =

Wang Jing may refer to:

- Wang Jing (Three Kingdoms) (died 260), Wei politician of the Three Kingdoms period
- Jing Wang (professor) (1950–2021), MIT professor
- Wang Jing (businessman) (born 1972), Chinese billionaire businessman
- Wang Jing (mountaineer) (born 1975), mountaineer and co-founder of Toread Holdings Group Co., Ltd.
- Wong Jing (王晶; born 1955), Hong Kong film director, producer, actor, presenter, and screenwriter
- Gingle Wang (王淨; born 1998), Taiwanese actress

== Sportspeople ==
- Wang Jing (canoeist) (born 1971), Chinese canoeist
- Wang Jing (athlete) (born 1988), Chinese sprinter

== See also ==
- Wangjing (disambiguation) for locations
- Wang Jin (disambiguation)
