= Visualizing Cultures (website) =

Pedagical website

Visualizing Cultures is an educational website intended to tie "images and scholarly commentary in innovative ways to illuminate social and cultural history." The project describes itself as a "gateway to seeing history through images that once had wide circulation among peoples of different times and places" and investigates history as "how people saw themselves, how they saw others including foreigners and enemies, and how in turn others saw them."

== History ==
The site was created in 2002 by Professors John W. Dower of the History Faculty and Shigeru Miyagawa of Foreign Languages and Literatures. It is affiliated with the MIT OpenCourseWare project, a project initiated in 2001 intended to make materials from MIT courses available freely online. The site uses digitized visual archive images to develop historical units covering events in China, Japan, and the Philippines in the modern era. Around 28 academics from different universities collaborated with Visualizing Cultures, producing 55 units comprising essays, visual narratives, and image galleries. The site design and structure was developed by the project's Creative Director, Ellen Sebring.

The first Visualizing Cultures unit, "Black Ships & Samurai," written by John Dower, juxtaposed the visual record from the two sides of the 1853–1854 encounter when Commodore Matthew Perry of the United States arrived in Japan aboard steam-powered gunboats to force long-isolationist Japan to open its borders.

Nine of the units include curricula designed for secondary school teaching. The project included workshops for teachers and a traveling exhibition that toured the United States, including an exhibit as part of the revival of Stephen Sondheim's play, Pacific Overtures on Broadway, and Japan. Visualizing Cultures (VC) has collaborated with more than 200 museums, libraries, and archives to make the digital visual record in the form of popular, political, and commercial historical images, freely accessible under the Creative Commons license.

== Awards and reception ==
The project was recognized by MIT with the "Class of 1960 Innovation in Education Award" in 2004. In 2005, the National Endowment for the Humanities selected VC for inclusion on "EDSITEment" as an online resource for education in the humanities. The curriculum on the website for the Canton Trade unit won the 2011 Franklin R. Buchanan prize from the Association for Asian Studies for "best curricular materials concerning Asia."

The New York Times described the site as "a kind of virtual museum in its own right, an addictive and visually stunning one not just for scholars but for anyone with even a casual interest in Japan and China and their economic and cultural interplay over the last 300 years." It called the site "a marvel of navigation, with topics and historical periods arranged in grids or in lists."

== 2006 controversy ==
On April 23, 2006, the MIT homepage posted a link to the Visualizing Cultures project in its "Spotlight" section. The "Throwing Off Asia" units included woodblock prints produced in Japan as propaganda during the Chinese-Japanese War of 1894–1895. One of the prints illustrated Japanese soldiers executing "violent Chinese soldiers," including graphic depictions of beheading and profuse bleeding from the captives' necks.

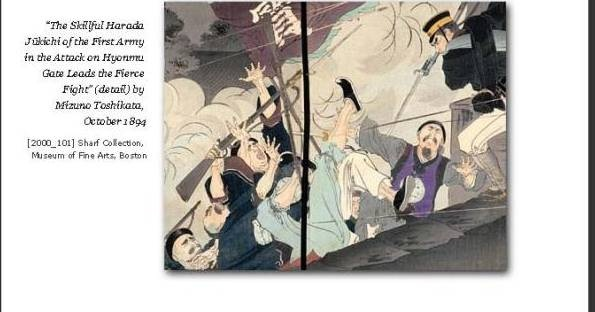
Visualizing Cultures original web page sample

The post sparked a campus-based protest led by Chinese students, who argued that the purpose of the project was not sufficiently clear to contextualize the negative messages of the historical images on the site. The protest led to general concerns over academic freedom and the right to student protest. The website was temporarily taken down in response to the criticism.

H-Asia, an international history and online discussion forum of scholars and teachers in the Humanities & Social Sciences, published exchanges and debate upon how it should be handled. Benjamin A. Elman' published "Teaching through the MIT Visualizing Cultures Controversy in Spring 2006". After a week, the MIT professors agreed to include additional context to the sections before republishing their work. The website remained online.

In 2015, Winnie Wong and Jing Wang edited a special issue on the debate seen in the larger critical context, reflects upon the events from multiple perspectives.
