= Pat Yang =

Chinese-American rural education development expert

Pat Kwei-Ping Yang
- 杨贵平
- Born: 1940 (age 84–85); Guizhou, China
- Education: Columbia University
- Known for: Sustainable development, Health care, Basic education

Pat Kwei-Ping Yang (simplified Chinese: 杨贵平; traditional Chinese: 楊貴平; pinyin: Yáng Guìpíng) is a Chinese-American rural education development expert, dedicated to rural education and sustainable development in China, with emphasis on women's literacy and health.

Pat Yang is founder of U.S.-based The Zigen Fund (滋根) and China-based China Zigen Association for Rural Education and Development (中国滋根乡村教育与发展促进会).

== Recognitions ==
- 2012: China News Weekly “Influencing China People of the Year” honoree
- 2019: China "Honour Book of Sustainable Development Education" honoree

== Documentaries ==
Films produced by Pat Yang and directed by Christine Choy:

- 2003: Sparrow Village - young girls yearn for education in a rural village of southwestern China
- 2007: No Fifth Grade - children in a village in Shanxi Province have to move to a bigger town to continue education of fifth grade and above
- 2007: Miao Village Medicine - barefoot doctors and hygienists working in a remote Miao village in Guizhou

== Publications ==
- 2017: Co-creating a Sustainable Village: Teacher Training Handbook
- 2018: Rural Revitalization: Sustainable Development Talent Training Handbook
- 2018: Rural Adolescent Girls' Sexual Health Education Teacher Training Handbook
