= Jin Wang =

Jin Wang may refer to:

- Wang Jin (disambiguation) — people with the surname Wang
- Jin Wang, a character in the novel American Born Chinese

== Chinese royalty ==
In Chinese history, Jin Wang (Chinese: 晉王, King/Prince of Jin or King/Prince Jin) may refer to:

=== Cao Wei and Jin dynasties ===
- Sima Zhao (211–265), Cao Wei regent, known as Prince of Jin from 264 to 265
- Emperor Wu of Jin (236–290), first emperor of Western Jin dynasty, known as Prince of Jin from 265 to 266 before he became emperor
- Emperor Yuan of Jin (276–323), first emperor of Eastern Jin dynasty, known as Prince of Jin from 317 to 318 before he became emperor
- Sima Bao (294–320), Jin dynasty prince and pretender, known as Prince of Jin after 319

=== 5th to 12th centuries ===
- Tuoba Fuluo (died 447), second son of Emperor Taiwu of Northern Wei
- Emperor Yang of Sui (569–618), held the title Prince of Jin before becoming Emperor
- Emperor Gaozong of Tang (628–683), third emperor of the Tang dynasty
- Li Keyong (856–908), military governor during the late Tang dynasty
- Chai Rong (died 959), second emperor of the Later Zhou dynasty
- Emperor Taizong of Song (939–997), held the title Prince of Jin before becoming Emperor
- Yelü Aoluwo (died 1122), oldest son of Emperor Tianzuo of Liao

=== Yuan and Ming dynasties ===
- Gammala, (died 1302), son of Zhenjin, recreated as Prince of Jin in 1292
- Yesün Temür Khan, Emperor Taiding of Yuan, (1293–1328), the title before becoming Emperor
- Badamregjibuu, (?-1328) son of Yesün Temür Khan, Emperor Taiding of Yuan, recreated as Prince of Jin in 1324
- Zhu Gang, (died 1398), Ming dynasty prince, third son of Hongwu Emperor

== See also ==
- Jin (disambiguation)
