= The Zigen Fund =

American non-profit

- Founded: 1988
- Type: Non-governmental organization
- Purpose: Sustainable development, conservation, community education, advocacy
- Location: Flushing, NY, USA
- Coordinates: 40.7592561°N 73.8295644°W
- Region served: China
- Website: www.zigenfund.org

The Zigen Fund promotes human-centered sustainable development. It is a U.S. registered 501(C)(3) tax-exempt non-profit organization founded by Pat Yang in 1988. A sister organization, China Zigen Rural Education and Development Association, is among the first fully registered nonprofit organization in China in 1995. The two organizations cooperate to support grassroots efforts of the impoverished people for life improvement and sustainable local development. Other Zigen sister organizations, in Taiwan (1990), Hong Kong (1992, re-registered 2009) are also locally registered as non-profit organizations. The network of Zigen organizations conduct fundraising and outreach activities locally, and collaborate on program support in China.

== Initiatives ==
The Zigen Fund is one of six partners of China UNESCO Education for sustainable development (ESD) in training teachers and village leaders in rural China.

Since the early 1990s The Zigen Fund has been supporting programs in the education domain in rural China, particularly in providing Financial Aids programs to girls who otherwise do not have the opportunity to receive formal education. For the past 30 years, The Zigen Fund has diligently sustained its programs with no interruption, and has enabled cohorts of girls in these communities to complete their formal education, and became the first generation teachers, healthcare workers and entrepreneurs in their villages. Over the years, The Zigen Fund has also expanded its scope of programs beyond the formal educational system to include environmental awareness, primary healthcare and cultural preservation.

Pat Yang found through investigation that rural school curriculum design often tends to be exam-oriented education in cities and lacks integration with the local rural environment. For example, there is an overemphasis on textbook knowledge to focus on exams and limited funding and support for subjects such as environmental protection and cultural heritage. In addition, adult education opportunities in rural areas are insufficient, and most training programs focus on economic benefits rather than comprehensive community development.

Pat Yang puts forward the view that sustainable rural development requires a comprehensive approach not limited to economic growth but also includes environmental protection, cultural protection, and lifelong learning opportunities for different community members. Two key factors are cooperation with academic institutions such as Beijing Normal University and China Agricultural University to shape rural education and the influence of rural leaders in promoting village development.

The launch of the Education for Sustainable Development programme by Zigen Fund followed 30 years of organisational experience and marked a transition towards a broader focus on sustainable development in China.

Zigen supports:

1. Education – To provide sponsorship for basic (children) and adult education and to fund basic infrastructure for schools.

2. Basic healthcare – To provide paramedical training programs and health clinics in rural areas.

3. Environmentally sound technologies – To incorporate sustainable socioeconomic development to enhance the livelihood of villagers via grassroots support and environmental consciousness.

4. Rural village development – To fund various undertakings between villagers and support cultural events.

5. Migrant workers community – To sponsor and organize various community events and development classes for migrant workers.

6. International partnerships – To organize multicultural educational exchange programs and promote understanding between the villagers and exchange students.

== Funding ==
The Zigen Fund relies on a wide network of volunteers in many cities and states in the United States for its fundraising, administrative and project selection, and coordination activities. In addition, some of the resources are secured through personal donations, volunteering, child sponsoring, and small business partners.

== Current undertakings ==
Zigen projects promote education for sustainable development (ESD) in rural China through the establishment of Green Eco Schools. This is achieved by training local primary and secondary teachers who will return to their schools after the training to train more teachers in the development and the implementation of the curriculum to advance education for sustainable development based on their local needs. Schools that have gone through the relevant curriculum training, development, and implementation are named Village Green-Eco Schools which will also serve as the basis or model schools for others in the possible expansion of the ESD program.

== Zigen Green Ecological Schools ==
China began responding to the UN call to promote green ecological schools in the 1990s, but so far, most green schools are located in cities, rural areas are ignored. This new policy called for education structures to incorporate environmental education (EE). At the preliminary level of science and social studies that were introduced as core subjects. These schools aim to integrate environmental awareness, student participation, and an understanding of students social responsibility, though culture and local environment should stay preserved. The subjects in these classrooms vary from climate change and its effect on land/water consumptions to consumerism lifestyle and effects. To effectively educate children on topics pertaining to the environment, each ecological school must have 80% teacher participation in the training with 18 hours of dedication to covering all topics. Due to limited funding for these schools, most information is taught straight out of a textbook and very rarely engaging in real life environmental practices. Although The Zigen Fund differs in this area, these eco-schools bridge this gap by creating opportunities for students to impact the environment in the real world. These activities range from garbage recycling to planting tree. "One school, One Village", encapsulates Zigen's mission in combining the rural villages with sustainability through the power of education.

- Up to 2018, have already supported the establishment of 74 Green Eco Schools in 15 provinces and 30 counties.
- 3000 rural teachers have participated in the rural teachers training program and led the students together participating in the building of Green Eco Schools.
- 2016-2020 supporting the establishment of 100 village green-eco experimental schools.

== Revitalizing Village: Rural sustainable Leadership Training Program ==
Since 2016, Zigen has supported rural schools to participate in the Green Eco School Program through developing thematic teacher training, sponsoring schools to implement activities that are related to environmental education, local culture preservation, gender education, school-family-village engagement, collaborating with local education bureau to conduct best lesson plan selection, and to carry out county level program reflection and evaluation conference. In 2016–2019, approximately 3000 teachers from 74 rural schools in nine counties of six provinces (Yulong of Yunnan, Rongjiang of Guizhou, Qinglong, Fengning, Longyao, Baixiang of Hebei, Xinzhou of Hubei, Shilou of Shanxi, Linxi of Inner Mongolia, etc.) received systematic teacher training.

== Education ==
According to the Sichuan Provincial Department of Education, as of 1999, nearly 10 million girls still did not have the opportunity to study. One main reason was that the phenomenon of favoring boys over girls was too serious in remote areas.

During Pat Yang investigation in Leishan, she also found that many girls could not go to school until they were teenagers. Because the family could only afford to send one kid to school and families would often choose to give boys the opportunity to go to school, girls could only choose to help with housework.

Due to the severe imbalance in the enrollment rates of boys and girls in remote villages (the enrollment rate of boys is 77%, and the enrollment rate of girls is only 27.8%), the early work of the Zigen Fund focused on providing scholarships for poor rural girls. The Zigen Fund provided books and miscellaneous fees for more than 300 girls aged 6 and above in 12 remote villages to support them in completing six years of primary education.

Today, the Zigen Fund's support is no longer limited to girls but has expanded to orphans and poor boys. Its scholarship program has also expanded to some of the poorest villages in Guizhou, Hebei, and Yunnan. At its peak, the Zigen Fund was able to support the schooling of poor children in about 100 villages at the same time, including primary school to university.

== Rural Adolescent Girls Sex Health Education Teachers Training ==
ZIGEN has developed a research on the female adolescent sexual health education in poor areas, which has summarized the major problems that female adolescents confront:

(1) Lack of the fundamental knowledge, conscience and skills on health, physiological hygiene and sex, which arouse confusion, fright and inferiority when they come through physiological changes;

(2) Situations such as puppy love, marriage and pregnancy in early age contribute to some female adolescents’ incompleteness of compulsory education;

(3) Lack of essential sexual knowledge and the perception in self-protection increase their risk of sexual invasion;

(4) Schools are quiet short of the teachers, textbooks and course management for adolescent sexual education;

(5) Left-behind children are the group with high risks of sexual invasion. Because of being left behind for a long run, the vast majority of female adolescents show poor consciousness of self-protection in poor districts.

== See also ==
- Poverty in China
- List of NGOs in China
- Education for sustainable development
- Sex education
