= Silver Lining Foundation =

Chinese non-governmental organization

Silver Lining Foundation (雲彩行動)
- Founded: 2007
- Founder: Chris and Lydia Yeung
- Type: Non-governmental organization
- Purpose: Orphans and Cerebral Palsy Victims
- Location: Nanning, China
- Region served: Guangxi Province
- Website: www.thesilverliningfoundation.org

The Silver Lining Foundation (Chinese: 雲彩行動, YúnCǎiXíngDòng) was founded in Nanning, Guangxi, China, in 2007. Silver Lining started as a small shop that sold hand-crafted jewelry. Nearly all the employees were disabled orphans. In 2009, an orphanage (Gūan ài Zhōng Xīn) was instituted in Dahua, Guangxi, China, and in 2011 a rehabilitation center for children diagnosed with cerebral palsy was built. The founders of the Silver Lining Organization are Chris and Lydia Yeung, who currently live in Nanning, China with two of their children.

== Mission statement ==
To improve the lives of impoverished children and their families and to educate, care for, and show love to all individuals, equipping them with the proper tools to give back to their community.

== History ==
In 2005, Chris and Lydia Yeung, along with their three children, came to China to work at an orphanage for disabled children. They returned to the United States that year, but in 2007, the Yeung family once again returned to China. Chris and Lydia started to work with the disabled orphans they met in 2005 and discovered that many of them were without jobs because of their disabilities. Lydia decided to help these young adults and started a swarovski crystal shop in a small apartment. In 2008, Silver Lining started to sponsor impoverished families whose children had cerebral palsy. The next year, Silver Lining foundation signed a five-year contract to reserve a building for future use as their first orphanage. In 2010, Silver Lining started to sponsor poverty-stricken children in the DaHua mountain rural areas. In the same year, the Silver Lining Foundation was officially recognized as a non-profit organization by the Chinese and Hong Kong governments. Silver Lining created a rehabilitation center for cerebral palsy children in 2011.

== Silver Lining Foundation Projects ==
=== Silver Lining Workshop ===
The first of the Silver Lining Foundation projects, the Silver Lining Workshop, was established in 2007. Lydia said that the purpose of starting this workshop was to give hope and opportunities to individuals society had overlooked. The Silver Lining Workshop offers employees musical lessons that have resulted in the starting of a band called "Inspiration" by the handicapped orphans.

=== Silver Lining Orphanage ===
In 2009, Silver Lining started an orphanage in DaHua, Guangxi, China. The Silver Lining Care Center added a new dimension to the structure of the orphanage. In order to provide a healthy home environment for the children, every six children are assigned to a married couple who live under the same roof.

=== Silver Lining DaHua Mountain Sponsorship ===
As of 2010, the Silver Lining foundation has been sponsoring a school located in the poverty stricken mountains of DaHua. Silver Lining provides vegetables, meat, blankets, clothes, and beds for the children who live at school during the school year.

=== Silver Lining Rehabilitation Center ===
In 2012, the Silver Lining Rehabilitation Center opened for children with cerebral palsy. The Silver Lining Rehabilitation Center offers free rehabilitation care for families and their children. Their goal is to both physically and psychologically heal the victims: to help them be holistically healthy.
