= Pfrang Association =

Chinese education charity

- Founded: November 2000 by expatriates living in China
- Type: Non-profit; Charitable organization
- Location: Nanjing, China
- Services: Raising awareness, fundraising
- Fields: Supporting education of underprivileged children in Jiangsu Province
- Website: http://www.pfrangassociation.org

Pfrang Association (also known as Pfrang) is a charitable organization based in Nanjing, China which raises money to assist with the education of children in the poor and rural regions of Jiangsu Province. Its aim is to help overcome social inequality and as a result break the cycle of lack of education, poverty, and crime.

== History ==
The Pfrang Association was established in November 2000 in memory of the deaths of Sandra, Thorsten, Petra and Jürgen Pfrang, inspired by the desire to keep their memories alive in a positive way. Jürgen Pfrang was a German manager working for DaimlerChrysler. During the night of 1 April 2000, Pfrang and his family were murdered in their Nanjing residence in a botched robbery attempt by four unemployed men who came to the city from a poorer nearby county. Six weeks later the four criminals were convicted and sentenced to death by the court. The Pfrang Association was set up within the same year by friends of the Pfrang family and other expatriates living in Nanjing.

== Background ==
The Pfrang Association is hoping to uphold the name of those who were killed and tries to do so by helping to break the vicious circle of lack of education, unemployment and crime. The association has put their focus on making it financially possible for students to stay in school so that they may grow up, reach their full potential and as a result have many fulfilling opportunities in life. This action is meant to tackle the root of the problem and the association hopes to expand their program every year like they have in the past.

== Work ==
Each year the Pfrang Association holds two major fundraising events, the Pfrang Gala in April and the Pfrang Day in October. Both of these events are held at Nanjing International School and have enjoyed great participation by expatriates living in Nanjing as well as locals.

In cooperation with the Amity Foundation, the Pfrang Association has contacted a range of schools in the counties Lianshui, Guanyun and Huai'an in northern Jiangsu Province, and financially supports middle and high school students who are heavily disadvantaged and meet some of the following criteria:

- the per capita income of the applicants household is below the locally defined poverty line.
- neither the parents nor the direct relatives receive regular salaries, or are employed by a government agency or private business.

Amongst the applicants who meet these criteria, priority is given to:

- orphans
- students who are handicapped or who have a direct relative who is handicapped
- students from single parent families
- students from national minorities
- female students

The number of students supported by the Pfrang Association passed 500 in 2010.

Pfrang Association support is in all cases completely nonpaid.

== Contact ==
The administrative centre of the Pfrang Association is located in the offices of Baden-Württemberg International, Gesellschaft für internationale wirtschaftliche und wissenschaftliche Zusammenarbeit mbH China Liaison Büro (bw-i) in downtown Nanjing.
