= BN Vocational School =

Coordinates: 39°56′16.9″N 116°26′10.1″E

Location
- 51 Wangjing West Road, Chaoyang District; Beijing; China

Information
- School type: Private, not-for-profit, vocational school
- Motto: Education Lights the Journey of Life
- Established: 2005
- Chairperson: Yao Li
- Age range: 16-20
- Website: www.bnvs.cn

BN Vocational School is a private, tuition-free vocational school in Beijing, China. The school was established in September 2005. It was founded by Yao Li. BN Vocational is the first tuition-free, not-for-profit, vocational secondary school in China.

== Education ==
Some of the services that BN Vocational School provides include professional education for impoverished youths including the children of migrant workers, vocational training, and pre-employment training. BN Vocational is the first privately run and funded school in Beijing servicing migrant children of high-school age. It develops the practical skills of the children of the most disadvantaged sector of workers.

Majors include home and property management, plumbing and air-conditioning, and technical maintenance and electrician.

== Recruitment ==
Prospective students must have completed middle school then passed a customised entrance examination. The examination is centred on Chinese and mathematics. A maximum of 100 students are taken each year.

== Funding ==
In addition to local funding the school has received international sponsorship. For example, Dell has given computers and Motorola the equipment in the electronics laboratory. Ireland has donated 50,000 yuan to the school. The donation was presented by the then Irish Minister of State Conor Lenihan on 17 March 2006.
