= Green Map =

Green Map System, Inc.

Green Maps are locally created environmentally themed maps with a universal symbol set and map-making resources provided by the non-profit Green Map System. Based on the principles of cartography each Green Map plots the locations of a community's natural, cultural and sustainable resources such as recycling centers, heritage sites, community gardens and socially conscious businesses, as well as hazards and challenges to health and wellbeing. Green Maps have been made in 65 countries.

== History ==
Green Maps are an educational and environmental communication tool for advocacy and public awareness first created for New York City by eco-designer Wendy Brawer of Modern World Design in 1992 as seen at the Green Apple Map website. The global Green Map System was formed as a result of the response to this first Green Map. Since 1995, Green Mapmaking has grown steadily around the world.

The nonprofit’s first mapping platform debuted in 2009 and has over 41,000 locally charted sites at opengreenmap.org. OGM2, their second platform, is in beta in 2020 at new.opengreenmap.org. The Green Map archive at New York Public Library Map Room includes 600 printed Green Map editions, copies of all the Green Map books and booklets, along with 300 locally made education and outreach resources made by city agencies, non profits, youth and community groups.

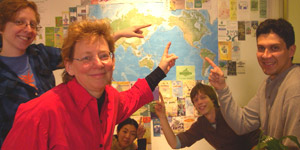
Green Map System's staff

Green Map’s office in New York City is the resource development, outreach and support center for the movement. Various regions have formed local support networks to help community-led Green Map projects develop and share their outcomes, supported by Green Map System. A 2002 ‘Summit’ at Bellagio, was a catalyst for hubs that formed in Japan, Taiwan, Indonesia, Europe; an ongoing example is the national Cuban Green Map network.

The website GreenMap.org is the gathering point for both the makers and the users of Green Maps. GreenMap.org went online in 1995 and it was re-launched in May 2007, with a resource center for Mapmakers all over the world to communicate and exchange their Green Map making experience. This content management system was named the Greenhouse, symbolizing its ability to cultivate and present a “garden of Green Maps”. GreenMap.org was relaunched as a story-sharing website when the organization shifted to a Creative Commons 4.0 license in 2018, now all the resources are available at no cost under a Creative Commons BY-NC-SA license with reciprocity from commercial projects.

Although Green Map System authorizes local mapmakers to use its Green Map icons and tools, every project is independent and locally led. Grassroots and established non-profits, universities and schools, governmental and tourism agencies use the globally designed icons and adaptable methodologies to develop and publish their own community's Green Map in a way that meets the needs of residents and visitors. For example, university-community collaborative projects have taken place for twenty years at University of Victoria in British Columbia, Canada, delving into perspectives ranging from First Nations, LGBTQ, and early childhood education.

== Awards received ==
- 2017: TED Residency and TED Talk
- 2013: Creative Climate Action Award video
- 2011: Treehugger Best of Green
- 2005 NGO Global Village Award - Aichi EXPO (Japan)
- 2001: Technology Benefiting Humanities Awards Laureate
- 1999: National Award for Sustainability from the President's Council on Sustainable Development and others.

== Branding and spelling ==
While Green Map System prefers and promotes the spelling "Green Map" to preserve trademark claims, "green map" and "greenmap" are often used by local Green Map projects. Green Map System is concerned with maintaining control of copyright and trademark in order to preserve the perceived integrity of the system; they wish to prevent the use of Green Maps in greenwashing and do not allow public use of their assets. Since 2018, open and creative use by local Green Map projects, including Green Map NYC, of formerly copyrighted resources is encouraged.

The Green Map tagline is “Think Global, Map Local!”. It’s a play on the familiar think global - act local, and implies the same depth of local involvement for positive change.

All Green Maps use a set of globally designed Green Icons. Developed collaboratively by the network of local project leaders and Green Map System. This is one of the world’s first universal symbol sets for maps. The globally designed icons ensure that all Green Maps engage and guide a diversity of users. Because concepts of sustainability are continually evolving, Green Map System released version three of the icon system in March 2008, provided as sets of images or as a font for ease of use or as stickers for youth/computer-less Green Mapmakers.
