= Wangjing =

Wangjing may refer to several places:

== China ==
- Wangjing, Beijing (望京), a major residential, technological and business area in Beijing
- Wangjing SOHO, a tower complex in Beijing
- Wangjing, Tang County (王京镇), town in Tang County, Baoding, Hebei Province

=== Metro stations ===
- Wangjing station
- Wangjingxi station (Wangjing West station)
- Wangjingdong station (Wangjing East station)
- Wangjingnan station (Wangjing South station)

== India ==
- Wangjing, Manipur, town and a nagar panchayat in Manipur

== See also ==
- Wangjin, traditional Chinese headware
