= Guizhou Rural Tourism Development Center =

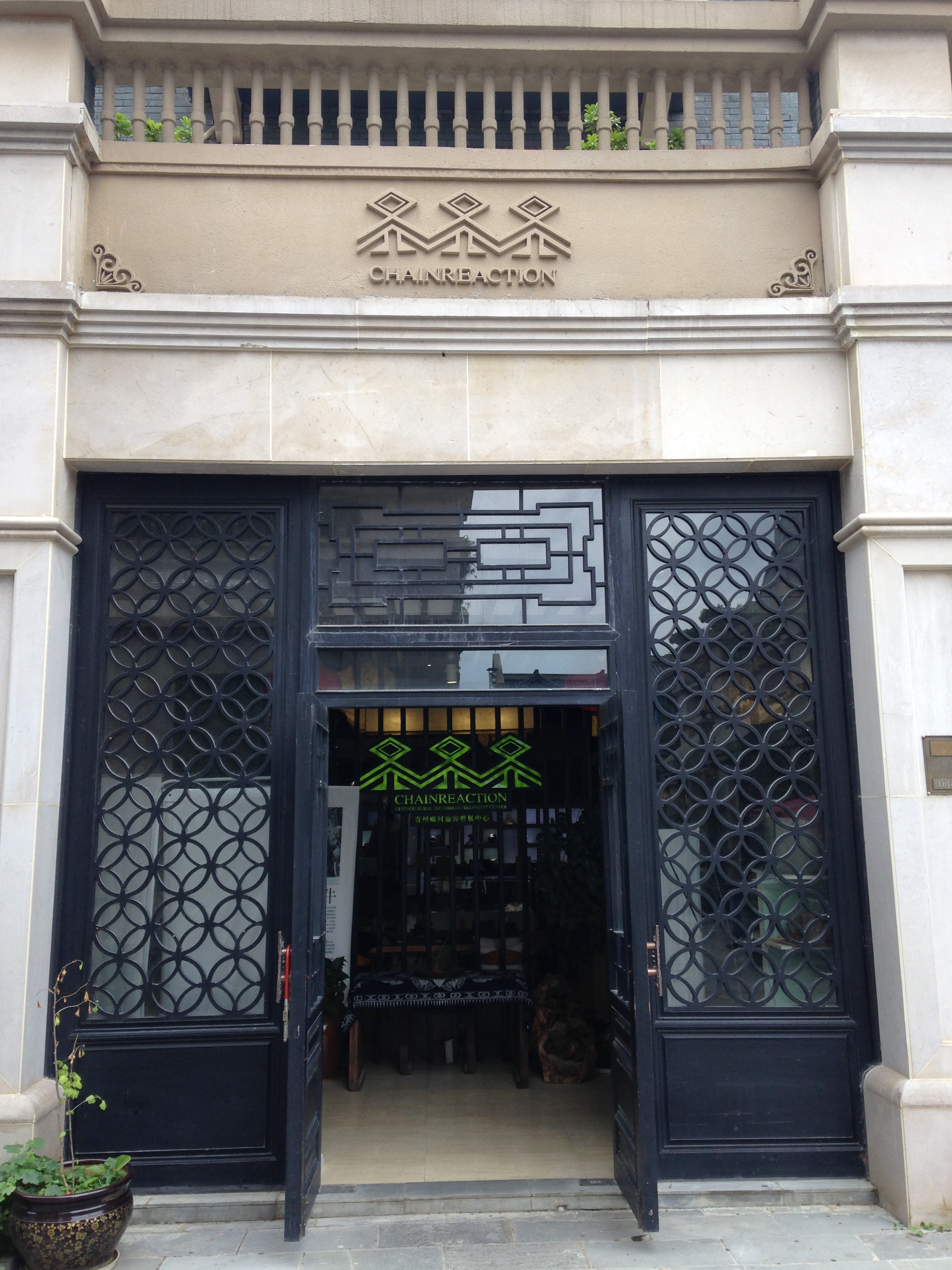
- Type: Non-profit organization
- Location: Guizhou, China
- Key people: Dean Zhang Xiaosong, Guizhou Normal University, School of International Tourism and Culture
- Affiliations: Chain Reaction NGO Time Town Guizhou

The Guizhou Rural Tourism Development Center (贵州乡村旅游发展中心), founded in 2006, was then approved by the Guizhou People's Congress as a non-profit organization. It is devoted to preserving, protecting and developing the diverse culture and non-material heritage of ethnic minority groups in southwest China, particularly their beautiful handicraft art. It is also devoted to helping Guizhou's young generation of designers and others who desire to promote ethnic art. Over the years, the Guizhou Rural Tourism Development Center has partnered with many domestic and international organizations, modern designers and young volunteers in seeking to uncover the precious art of Guizhou's many ethnic minority groups, to promote innovative design and to protect this wonderful inheritance.

== History ==
The Guizhou Rural Tourism Development Center was founded by Zhang Xiaosong (张晓松) in 2006. Zhang Xiaosong is the Dean of Guizhou Normal University's School of International Tourism and Culture and one of the World Tourism Organization's seven international experts. The center was originally located at Guizhou Normal University, but then opened shop in Time Town Guizhou (时光贵州) in 2014, a tourism business center located in Qingzhen City, half an hour outside of Guiyang.

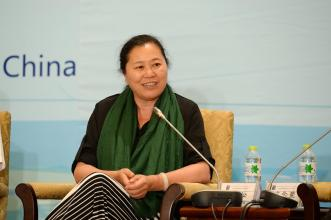
Dean Zhang Xiaosong, founder of the Guizhou Rural Tourism Development Center

== Handicraft Art ==
=== Cultural Themes ===
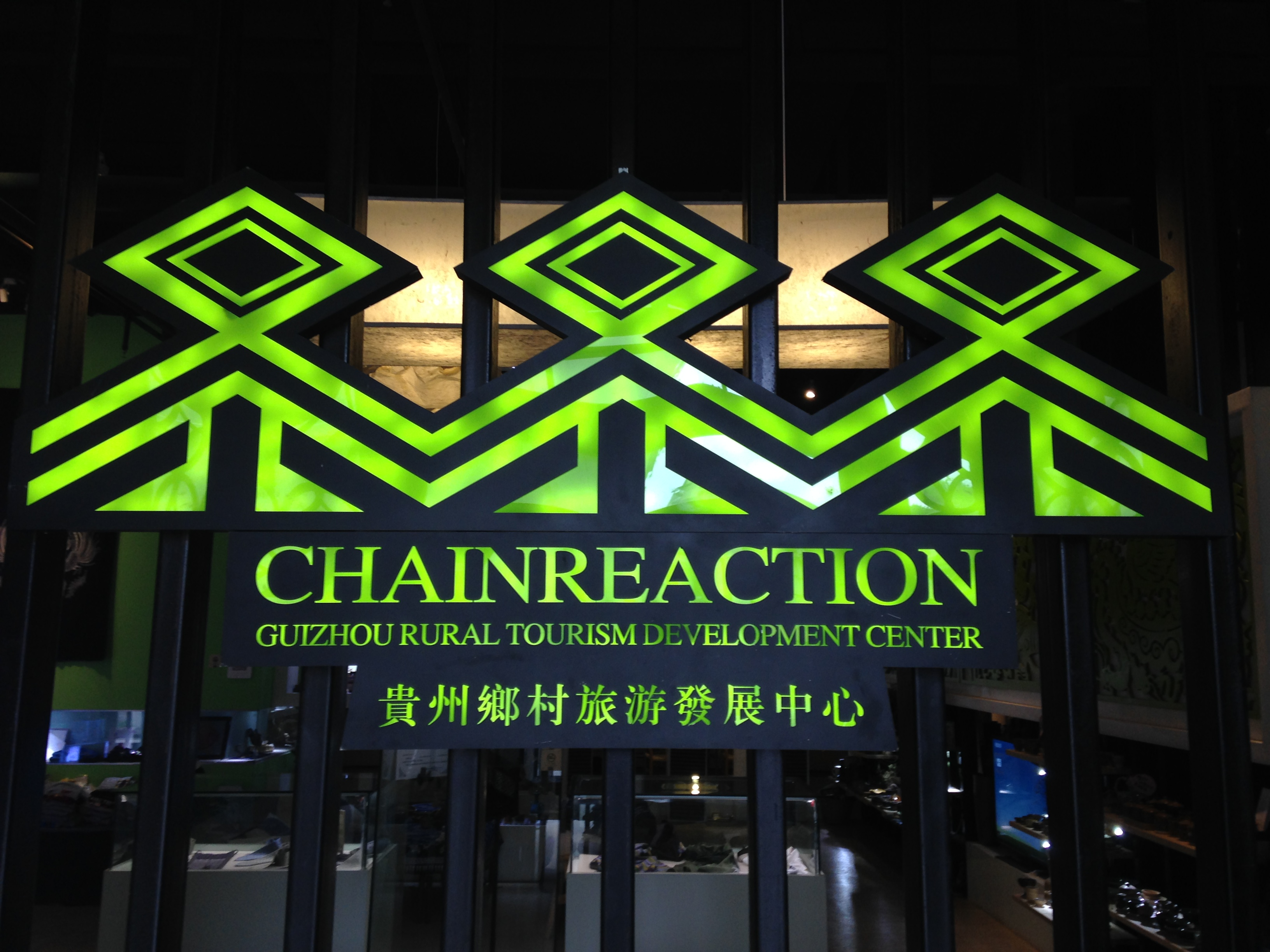
The logo features three people holding hands: The middle figure represents the center. The left figure represents the artists whose handicrafts are displayed at the center (including Miao women making traditional craft products and younger artists, such as Chun Feng). The right figure represents the younger generation of recent college graduates who are working at the center as designers and entrepreneurs.

Mother Butterfly Creates First Ancestors

The sweet gum tree gave birth to Mother Butterfly, who then fell in love with Water Droplets. The two of them had twelve eggs, though Mother Butterfly could not properly take care of them. She then called upon Fortune (Jiyu) Bird to help brood them. After Fortune (Jiyu) Bird brooded over them for forty nine days the eggs hatched and out came a dragon, snake, tiger, water buffalo, elephant, centipede, thunder and the founder of the Miao people, Jiangyang. Because of this, the Miao people highly venerate Mother Butterfly as their founder and use her symbolic image in many of their handicrafts.

.Yang A'Sha – Miao Goddess

The village of Wubao used to be a lake and one morning a group of fairy geese came and landed upon this lake. As they opened their wings and began to dance, the people alongside the lake joined with them and together they shared an unforgettable moment.

At that time, by the lake there was a young hero who frowned upon this happy moment because his mother was sick. One of the fairy geese, Qimei, observed that this young hero's name was A'yue and that he was not only courageous, but that he also demonstrated filial piety towards his mother. Qimei was deeply moved and from that moment feel in love with A'yue.

While all the other fairy geese went back into the sky, Qimei stayed behind and appeared to A'yue in a well, taking upon herself the name Yang A'sha. She became a beautiful Miao woman and adorned herself with traditional Miao clothes. A'yue and Yang A'sha then feel in love and got married.

Golden Pheasant – Miao Divinity

According to tradition, when the Miao ancestors moved they only had three things: water buffalo, grain seeds and reed-pipes. After settling down, the grain seeds that they brought did not grow and they had to hunt, pick berries and fish in order to stay alive. Once an old man caught a golden pheasant, but lost it in a pile of dust outside his hut. After a while, corn grew from that place and the next year the old man re-planted the corn and this saved the lives of the Miao ancestors. Out of respect, they adopted the golden pheasant's mating dance and also drew its symbol on their clothes to pass on this information to future generations.

Miao Legend: Origin of Batik Art

A long time ago, the sky frequently fell down onto the earth. A young girl named Wa Shuang decided to make a big umbrella to prop the sky up. As she prepared the cloth, she left it under a pear tree. Pear blossoms then landed on the white cloth, which caused bees to come pollinate the flowers, leaving their wax on the cloth in the shape of the flowers. The secretions from the indigo grass underneath the cloth made the white cloth turn blue. When Wa Shuang returned she quickly took the cloth to the river to wash it clean. The blue color, however, would not wash out, even when using boiling water. Only the areas with the beeswax remained white, causing the blue canvas to be covered with the white flowers. Wa Shuang was overjoyed and used this cloth as an umbrella to prop up the sky. The blue canvas of this umbrella became the blue sky and the white flowers became heavenly bodies. Afterwards, Wa Shuang used this method to make batik art and taught it to the other girls in the village...

=== Seven Types of Art ===
- Batik Art (蜡染)
- Embroidery Art (刺绣)
- Ceramic Art (陶瓷)
- Old Paper Art (纸艺)
- Weaving Art (织艺)
- Silver Art (银艺)
- Wood Carving (木雕)
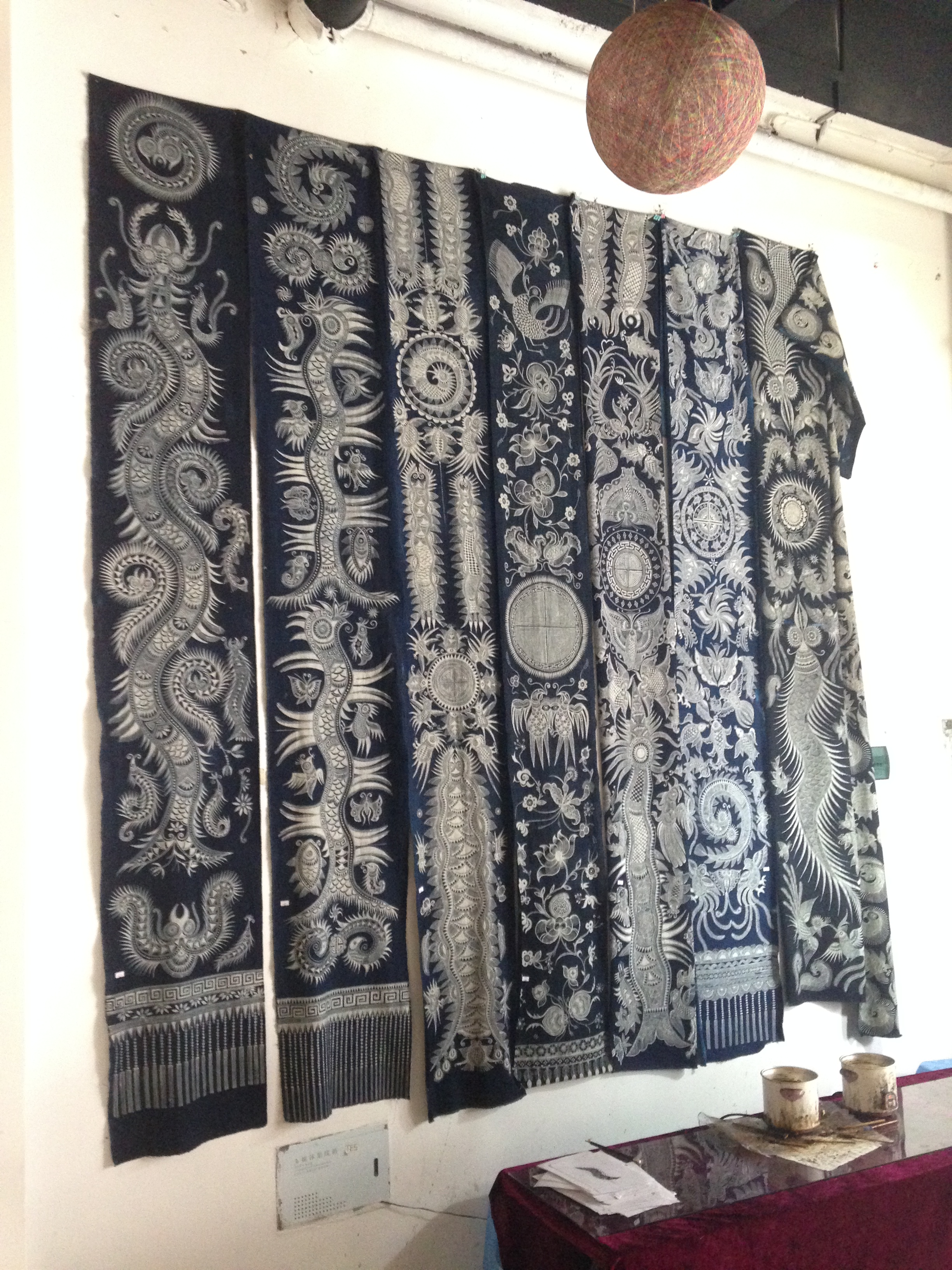
Batik Art

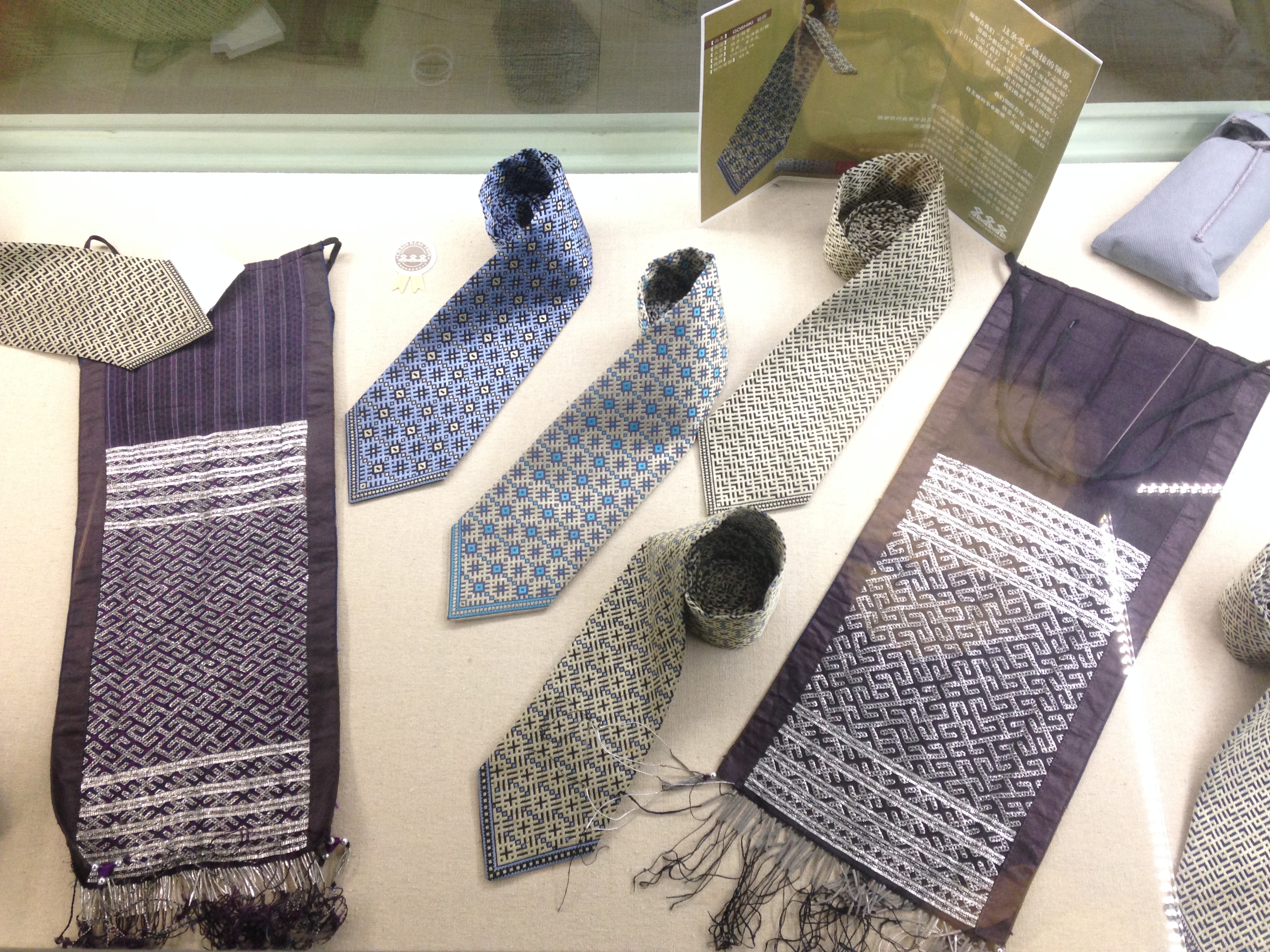
Embroidery Art

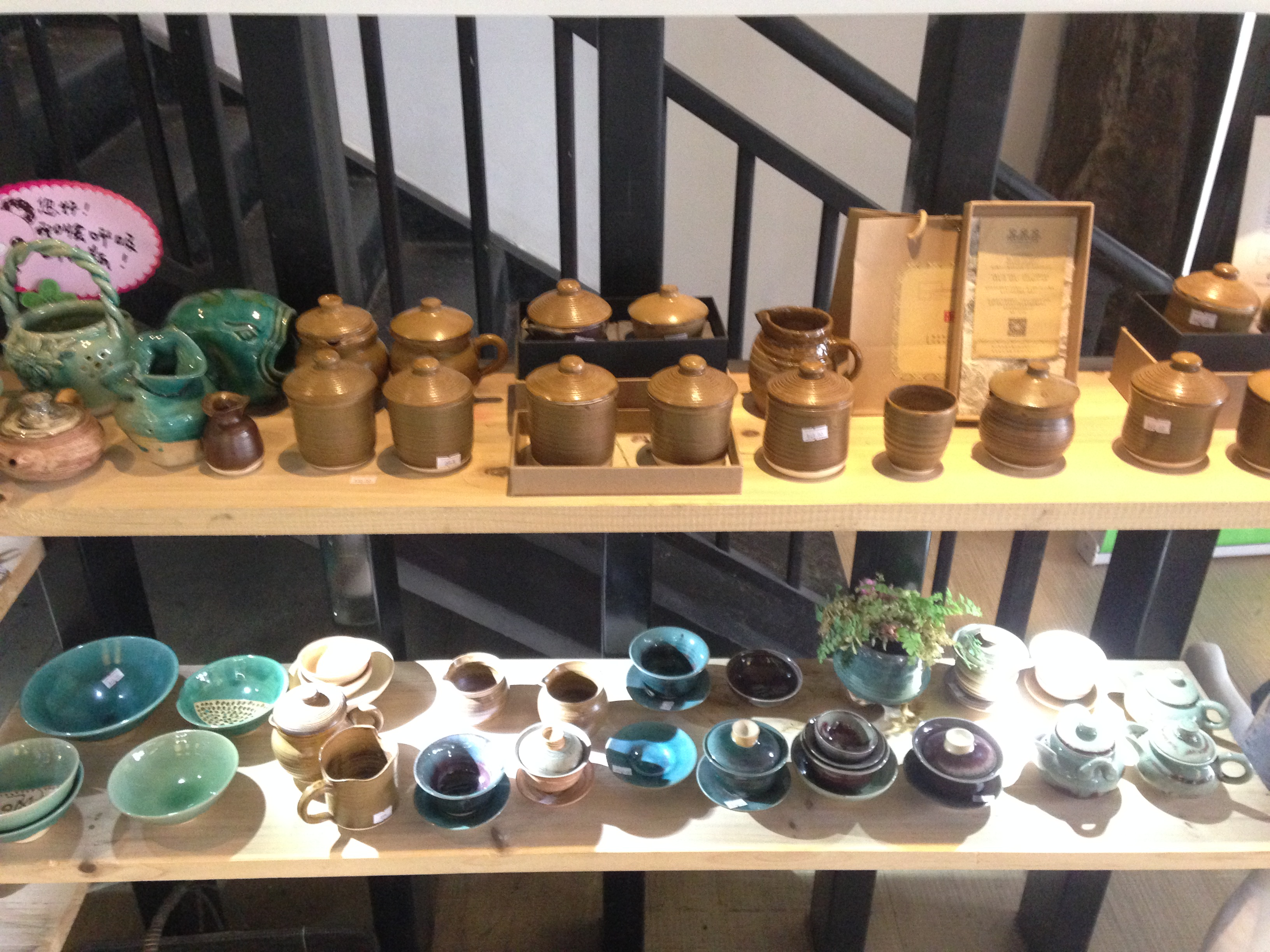
Ceramic Art

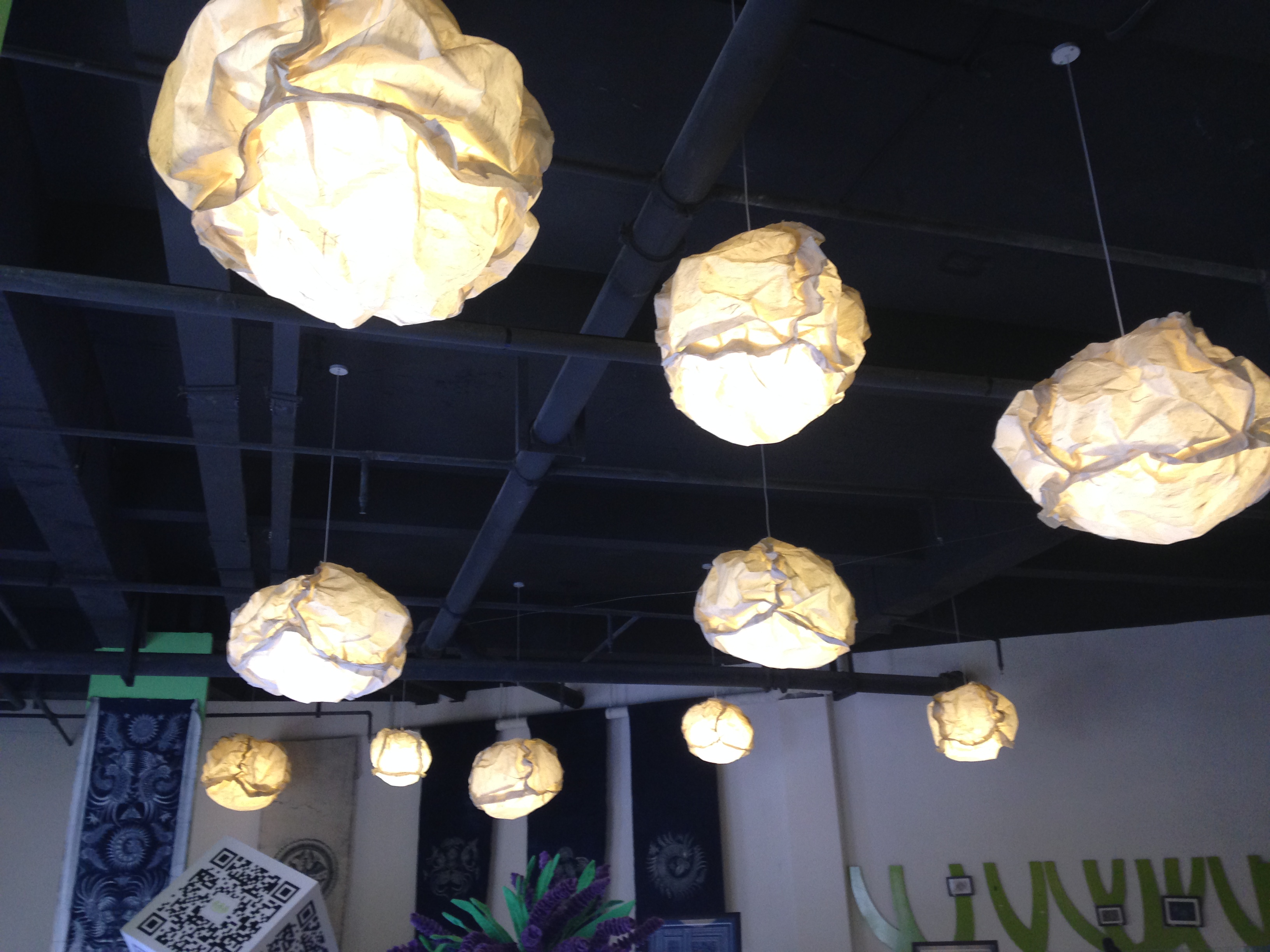
Old Paper Art

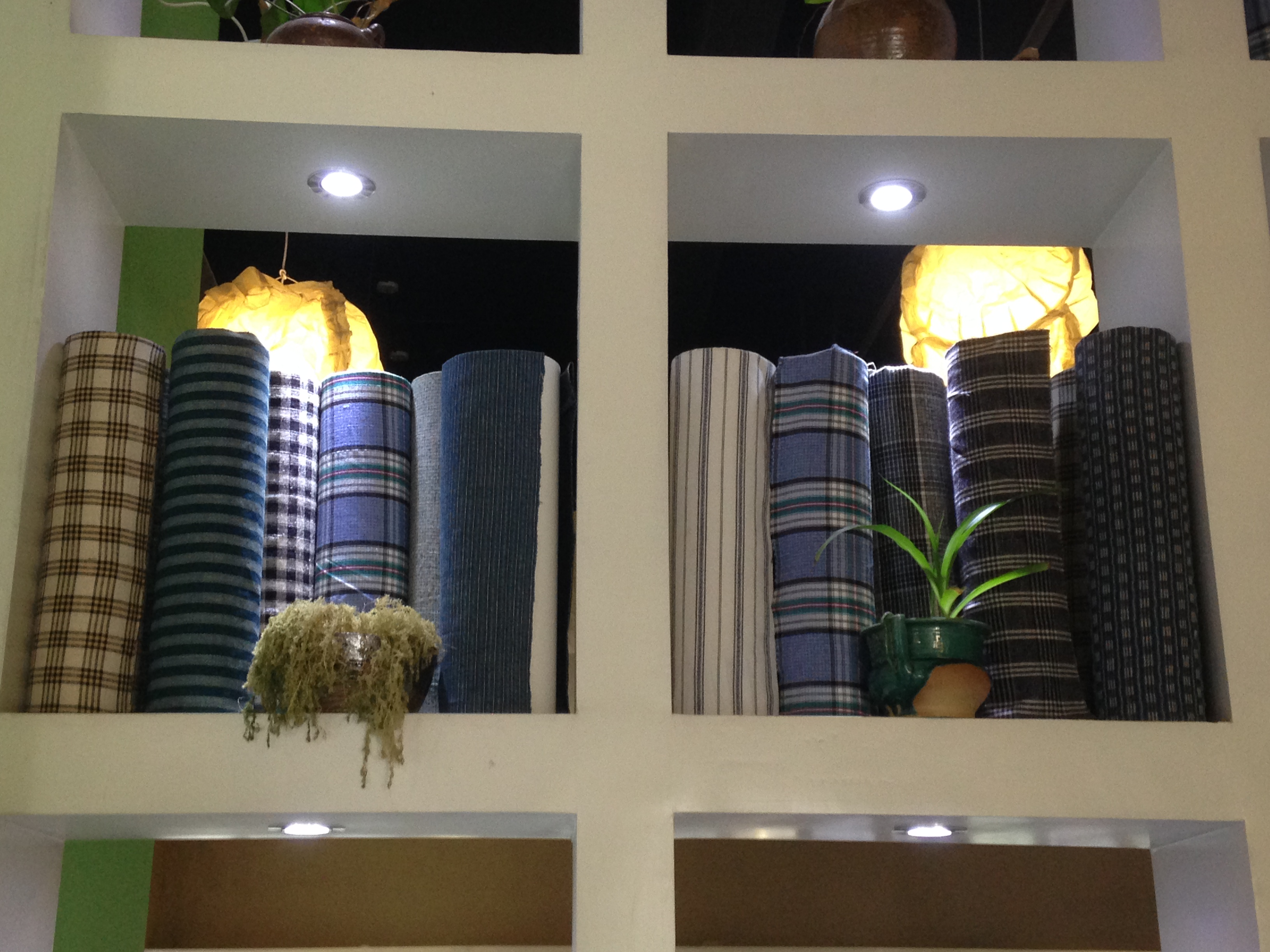
Weaving Art

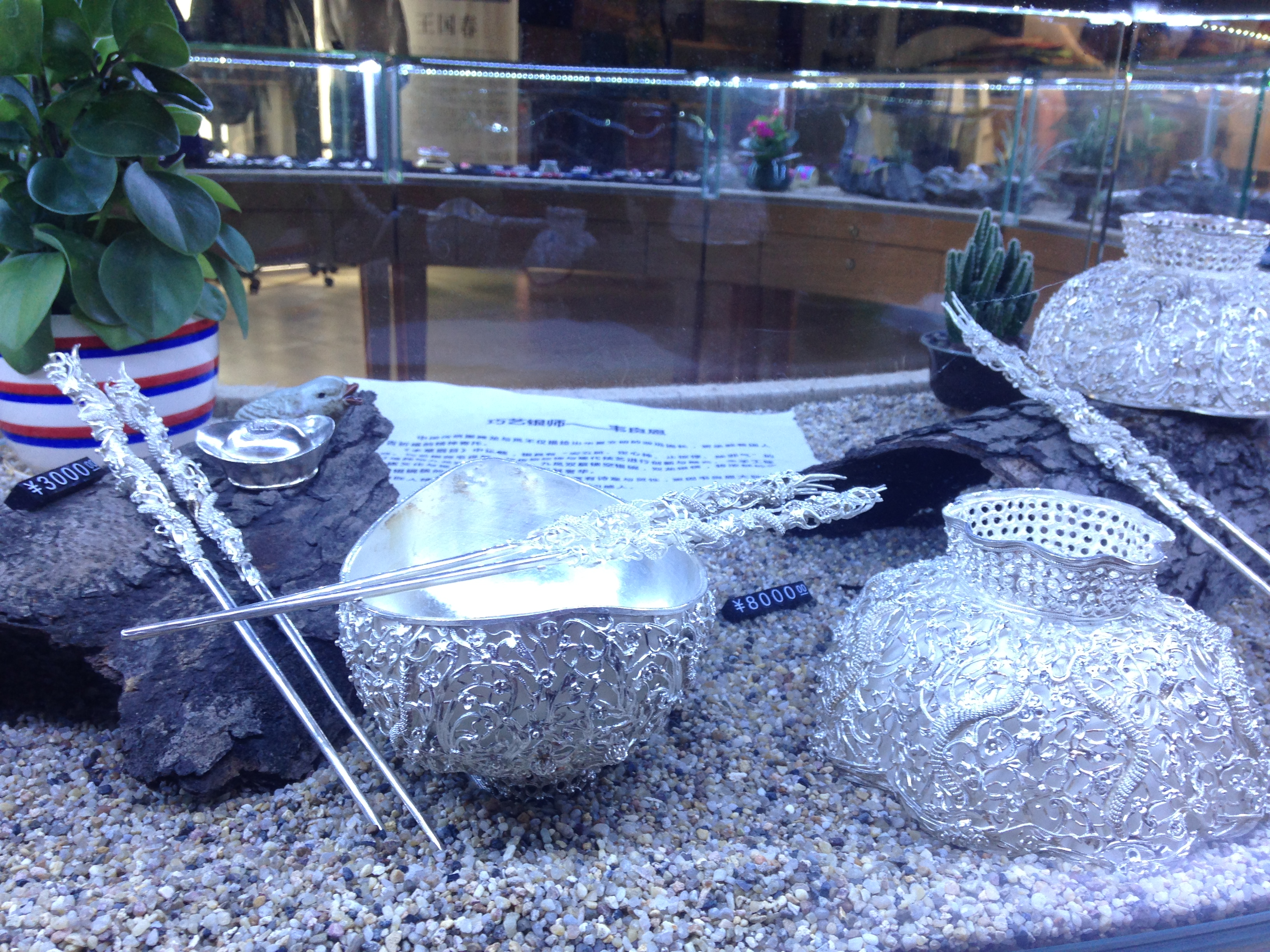
Silver Art

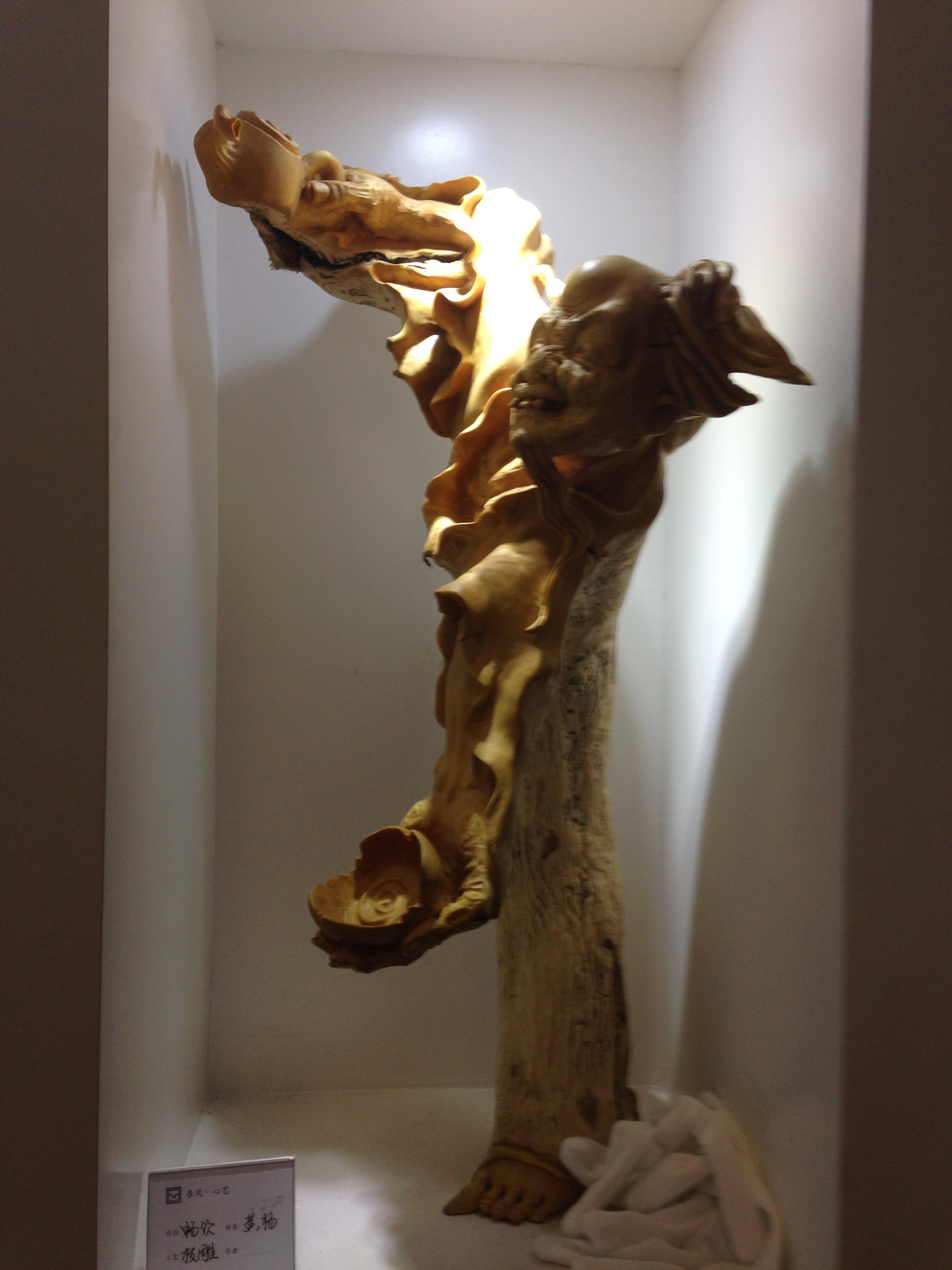
Wood Carving

== Artisans ==
=== Zhang Chunfeng ===
Zhang Chunfeng (张春风) specializes in making different types of wood carvings. In light of the environmental hazards associated with root carvings, He has pioneered the development of branch carving. Below is an article he wrote on the subject:

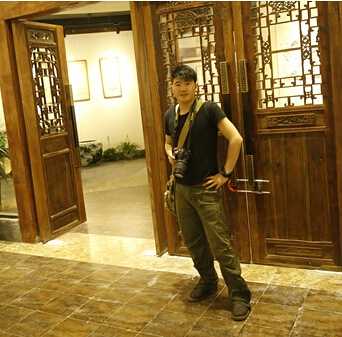
Zhang Chunfeng (张春风)

The Recovery of Life

"Tree branches serve as the basis for this new style of wood carving which seeks to create art from such objects. Tree stumps, damaged branches and dead tree trunks are also used as material.

Branch carving is a relatively new development and you would be hard-pressed to find examples of it among other forms of wood art.

Branch carving represents a transformation from death to life. This style of art uses material that has been abandoned as trash, that has been discarded by large trees and that has ultimately decayed and died. Mother nature has endowed these branches with life-reflecting inspiration, as evidenced through their many different forms and shapes. The artist draws upon his own perceptions of nature and humanity, combined with the inherent inspiration within the branches themselves, to endow the branch carving with additional artistic vitality. Branch carving regenerates that which was rotten, leading to the recovery of life.

Reflecting not only nature's inspiration, branch carving also serves as a portrait representing humanity's spirit and essence. As we utilize our creativity and look more intently we will discover that even rotten and decayed objects have magnificent beauty and life.

Every branch carving is individually unique, specially designed in accordance with nature's endowment of inspiration. The artist does not dare add any additional color or subjective fabrication to his carvings, but takes care to follow closely nature's special endowment given to each branch.

Branch carving preserves the essence of wood carving while imbuing its product with new life. In addition, this art form is environmentally friendly and does not entail the mass destruction of rare trees as it strives to follow the laws of nature."

(Translated from Mandarin Chinese to English)

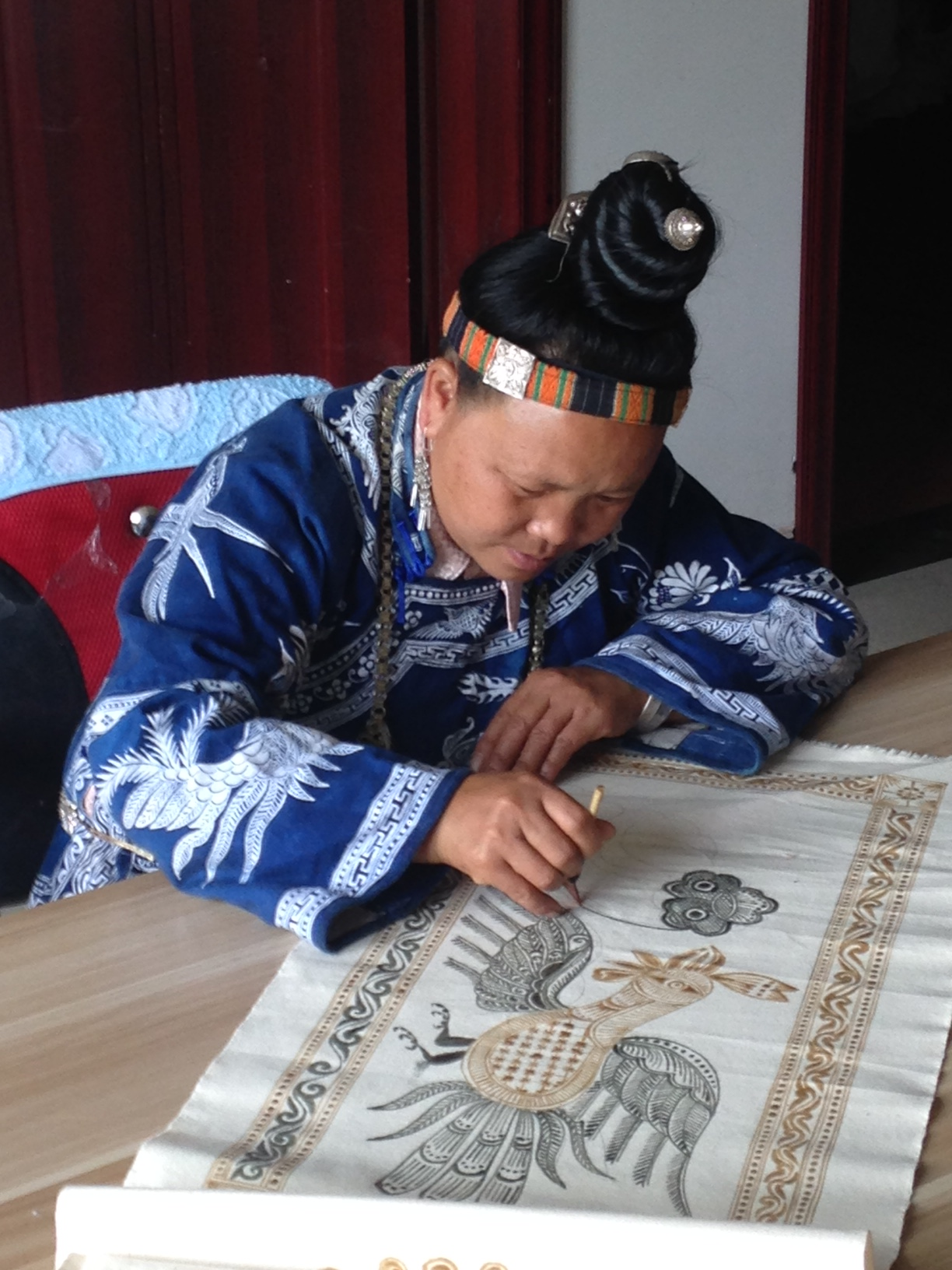
Yang Eryeniu making a beautiful piece of batik art.

=== Yang Eryeniu ===
Yang Eryeniu (杨二耶牛), a Miao batik artist, was born in Yangwu village in Danzhai county in Qiandongnan. Yang Eryeniu's name is patronymic: Yang is her Han surname, Er is her name meaning phoenix, Ye is her father's name meaning stone and Niu is her grandfather's name meaning bronze drum. When she was eight she first started leaning the art of batik from her mother, which was thirty years ago. Batik Art is an ancient handicraft from the ethnic groups in China's southwest mountain regions. Yang Eryeniu's drawings are full of creativity and draw on themes from her ethnic culture. Given a wax knife and a small pot of melted beeswax she can create on a white cloth all different kinds of drawings, such as: an elegant butterfly, a lively fish and a lifelike Miao phoenix...her strokes follow her heart and the wax follows her strokes in a smooth process of drawing.

=== Other Design Artists ===
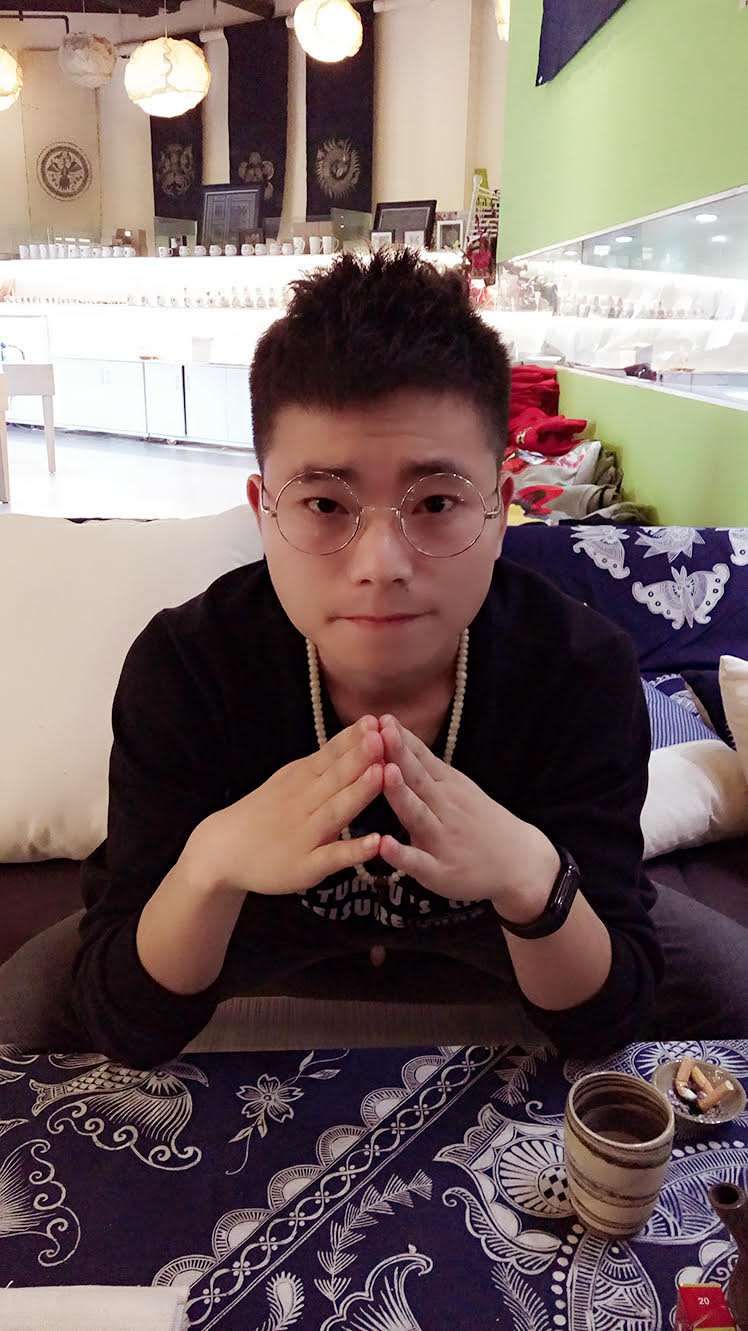
Tian Cheng (田诚)

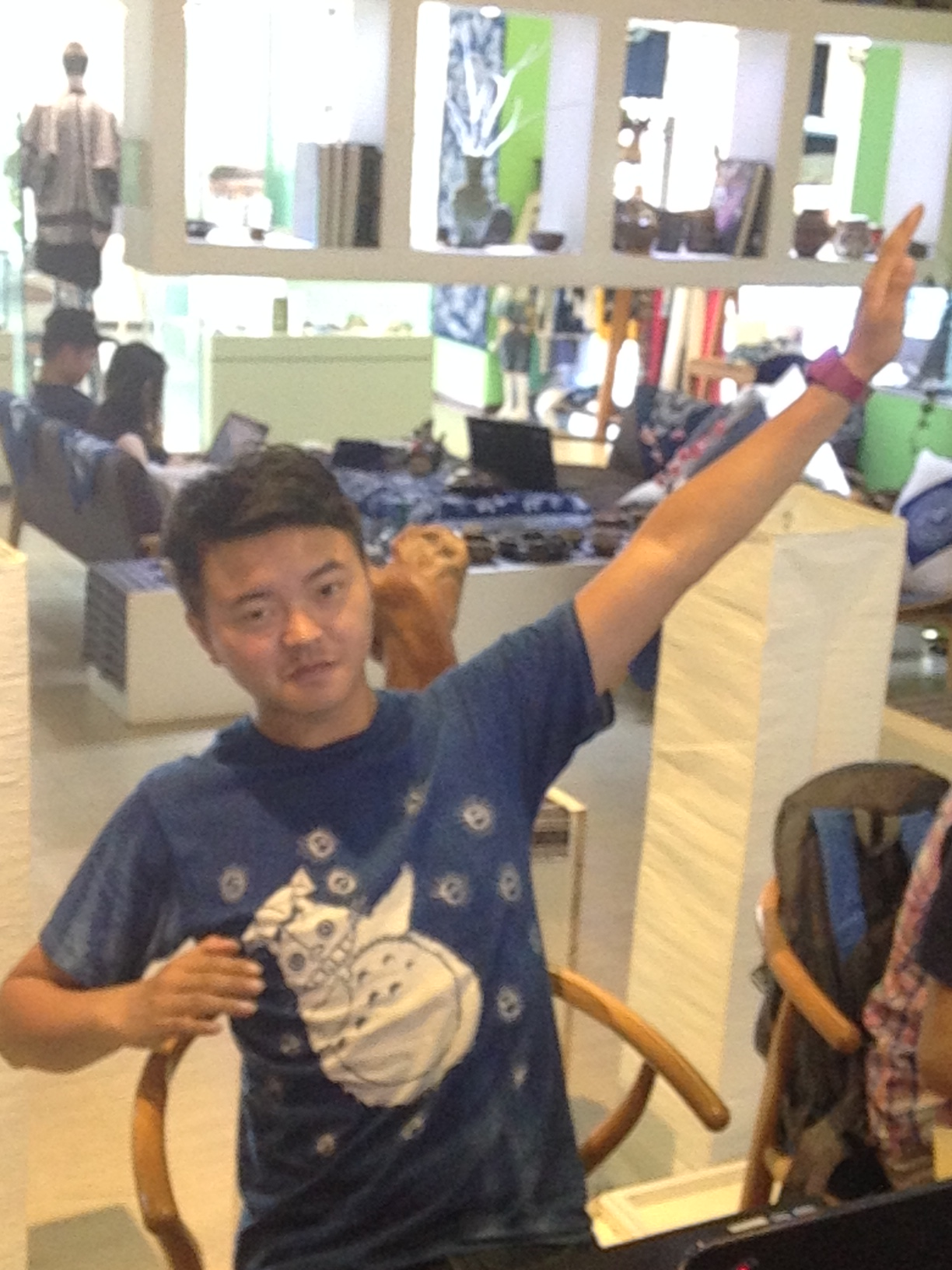
Li Chunyu (李春雨)

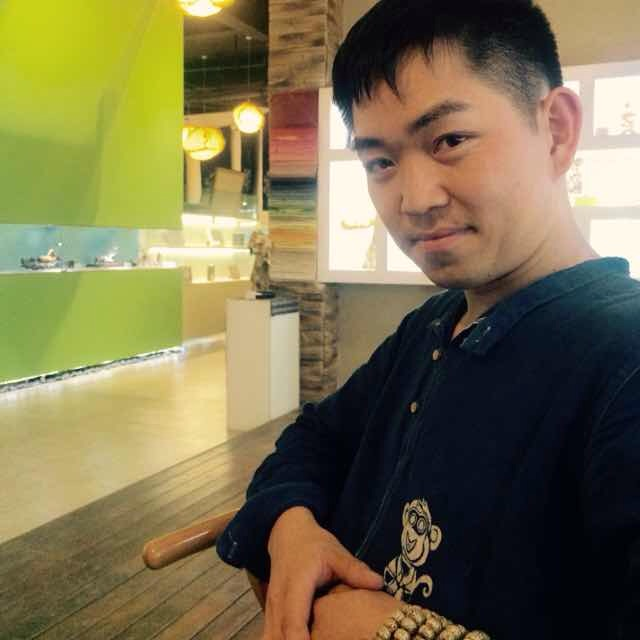
Wu Kun (武昆)

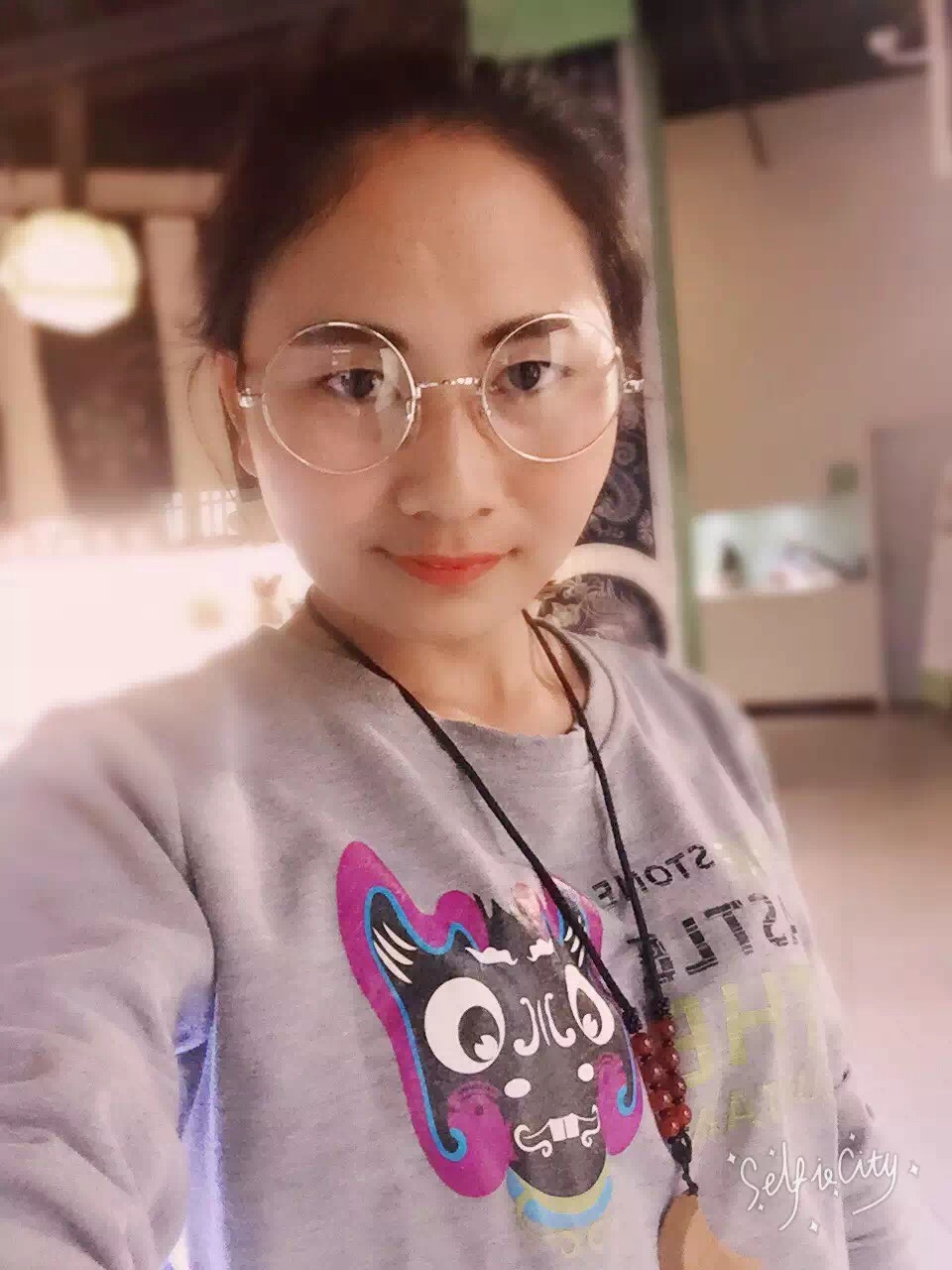
Leng Qiong (冷琼)

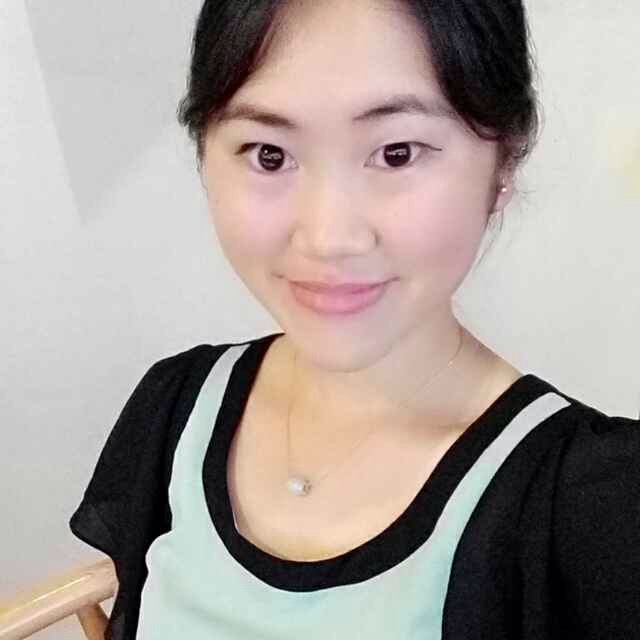
Guo Shuangqin (郭双琴)

== Outreach Initiatives ==
"For Our Daughters—Preserve and Protect Guizhou Minority Women Handicraft Art Program"

== Partner Organizations ==
- Shanghai World Expo (Bureau of International Expositions, BIE)
- United Nations World Tourism Organization, Regional Programme for Asia & Pacific
- Ohio State University, Department of East Asian Languages and Literature (https://deall.osu.edu/)
- Ohio State University, National East Asian Languages Resource Center (http://nealrc.osu.edu/)
- Ohio State University, Critical Language Scholarship Program
- University of Notre Dame, Liu Institute for Asian Studies
- University of California, Berkeley: Department of Anthropology
- University of Aveiro (Portugal), Department of Economics, Management and Industrial Engineering
- Hong Kong Federation of Women
- China National Tourism Administration
- China Development Bank, Education and Training Department
- Guizhou Province Tourism Bureau (http://www.gztour.gov.cn/en/)
- Tsinghua University, Research Center for Anthropology & Ethnology
- Shanghai Jiao Tong University
- Guizhou Normal University, School of International Tourism and Culture
- Chinese Academy of Social Sciences, Institute of Ethnology and Anthropology
- etc.

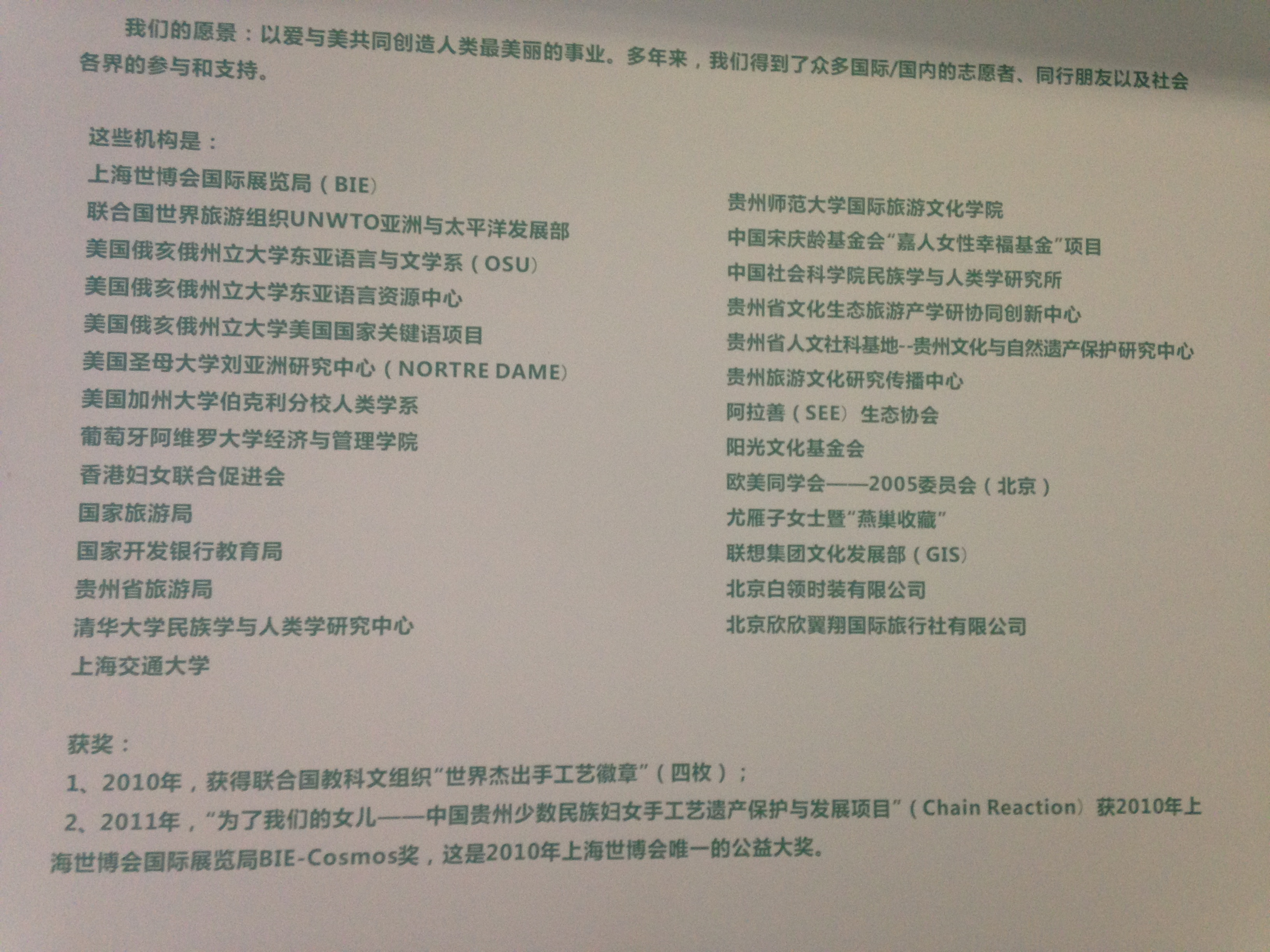
List of partner organizations and awards

== International Recognition ==
- 2010, UNESCO: Award of Excellence for Handicrafts (4 Pieces)
- 2011, "For Our Daughters—Preserve and Protect Guizhou Minority Women Handicraft Art Program" won a BIE-Cosmos award at the 2010 Shanghai World Expo (It was the only award given that year to a charity organization)
- 2016, CNN listed Guizhou as China's most underrated region
- 2016, New York Times listed as Guizhou as one of the top places to visit in 2016
