= ANESVAD Foundation =

Spanish nonprofit

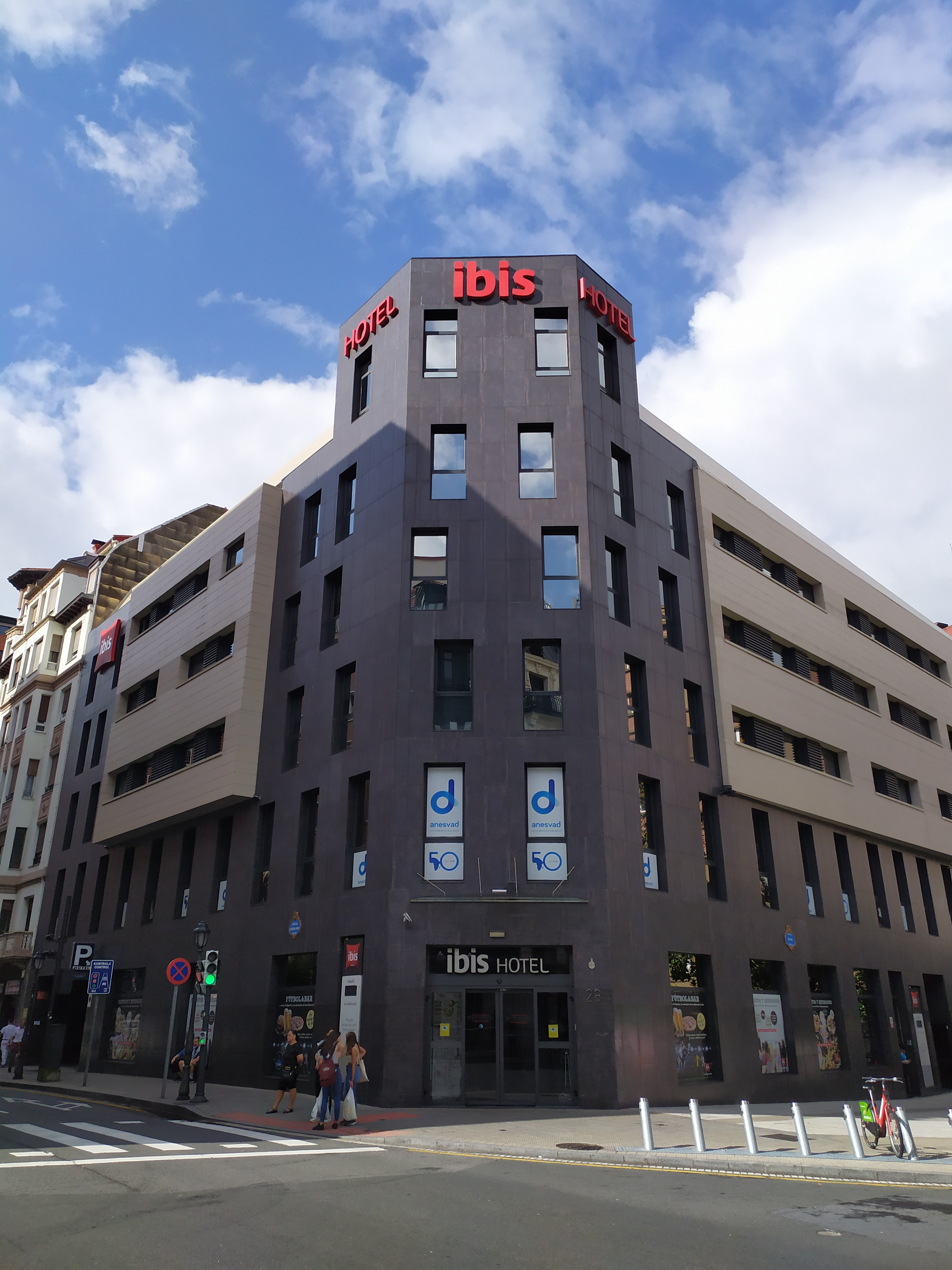
ANESVAD Foundation

ANESVAD Foundation - non-profit and non-governmental organization, which supports health and social development projects in Asia, Latin America and Africa. Established in 1968 in Bilbao, Spain.

In 1970, ANESVAD began fighting against leprosy in the Philippines by the help with the help of Father Javier Olazábal S.I. Gradually, the organization spread its activities to different fields: general health assistance, preventing child sexual exploitation, Buruli ulcer, HIV/AIDS in different countries.

Besides projects in developing countries, ANESVAD provides public awareness and education campaigns for development in its homeland Spain.

About 160,000 partners and collaborators from all over Spain support the ANESVAD operations, including the financial support from city councils, governmental institutions, and the AECI (Spanish Agency of International Cooperation).

The Foundation declares its main objectives, as health assistance, social development and public awareness. It works in Latin America (Argentina, Bolivia, Brazil, Ecuador, El Salvador, Guatemala, Mexico, Nicaragua, Peru, Dominican Republic, Venezuela), Asia (Bangladesh, Cambodia, China, Philippines, India, Laos, Thailand, Vietnam), Africa (Benin, Cameroon, Côte d'Ivoire, Eritrea, Ghana), Europe (Spain, Geneva).

ANESVAD spent 1,551,183 euro (2005) and 1,541,831 euro (2006) on its projects on health care assistance in Vietnam.

In 2012, newspapers reported that former executives of ANESVAD were convicted of embezzling more than 7.5 million euros from the organization between 2002 and 2006. A Biscay court sentenced former president José Luis Gamarra (Gamarra) to six years in prison for misappropriation of funds, ordering him to pay 3.2 million euros in compensation to ANESVAD. Former financial director Francisco Martínez Fernández and former director general José Miguel Sustacha Olabe received 21-month sentences for embezzlement and falsifying business documents but did not serve jail time due to their lack of prior criminal records. Gamarra maintained undisclosed bank accounts to receive donations, which he used for personal expenses, employee bonuses, interest-free loans, a car for his niece, and investments.
