= Box of Hope =

Hong Kong children's charity

- Founded: April 2008
- Founders: Nicole Woolhouse and Harriet Cleverly
- Type: Christmas Gift Donation
- Purpose: Delivering Christmas Presents to Children
- Location: 10 Villa Rosa, 88 Redhill Road, Tai Tam, Hong Kong
- Region served: Hong Kong
- Website: http://boxofhope.org/

Box of Hope is an annual charity project aimed at providing useful/educational gifts to underprivileged children in Hong Kong and Asia during Christmas, donated by Hong Kong school children and local organisations. Boxes of Hope are collected every year between late October and early November.

It is similar to the Salvation Army Christmas Present appeal.

== History ==
Box of Hope was founded by Nicole Woolhouse and Harriet Cleverly in April, 2008, and registered as a Charity in January, 2009. It was originally started to teach their own 6 children the gift of giving.

One of the aims of the project is to encourage children ranging from 3 to 18 years to be aware of their environment/community and show them how they can help make a difference, in addition to providing educational and fun gifts for children in need throughout Asia. Since November 2008, more than 100,000 Boxes of Hope have been donated. 24,000 were donated in November 2015.

== Donations ==
Boxes of Hope are collected every year in late October to early November. Donors donate by filling old medium-size shoe boxes (approximately 18 x 30 x 13 cm) with new interesting and educational gifts. Gifts must be new. They can be toys, educational supplies, hygiene items, or accessories. Donors are asked not to bring food, medication, war-related items, clothing, fragile items, liquids and dangerous items. The box and the lid is to be individually wrapped and secured with an elastic band. A sticker is then stuck on the lid of the box, indicating the type of gift inside, the age and gender the gift is suitable for, and a message to the child. The boxes are then dropped off at collection points and delivered directly to the children in need. There were more than 60 collection points in 2016, the majority of them being schools or kindergartens.

Donors can also send a donation of $200 instead, to help deliver 20 boxes to children in need.

=== Recipients ===
There are a number of recipients of the Box of Hope worldwide.

- China – Sunbeam Children's Village, Baiwan, Half the Sky.
- Macau – Cradle of Hope, Escola Sao Jose Orphanage.
- Hong Kong – Harmony House, Po Leung Kuk, Emergency care ward, HKSPC, The Duchess of Kent Children's Hospital, SOCO, Hong Kong Adventist Hospital Foundation, TREATS, Christian Action, Caritas Lok Yi School, Small Group Homes, Home of Loving Faithfulness, Enlighten Action, Hong Kong Child & Youth Services, ISSHK, Tung Wah Hospitals SGH. Salvation Army. Vision First. Hip Hong. Pathfinders. Saviour Lutheran School for Mentally Disabled Children, Kowloon. Princess Grace Children's Hospital & The Adventist Hospital Foundation HK.
- Kenya – Ananjali School.
- Philippines – International Care Ministries.
- Vietnam – Loreto, Mai Tam, Saigon Children's Charity.
- Cambodia – The Cambodian Children's Fund, This Life Cambodia & FCOP, Mothers Heart.
- Nepal – Child Welfare Scheme.
