= Wang Jin (film producer) =

Chinese film producer

- Born: September 7, 1980 (age 46); Bengbu, Anhui
- Occupations: Film producer, Television drama

Chinese name
- Traditional Chinese: 王錦
- Simplified Chinese: 王锦
Transcriptions
Standard Mandarin
- Hanyu Pinyin: Wáng Jǐn

Wang Jin (Chinese: 王锦) is a Chinese Film producer. He has planned, invested and released several TV dramas in the past ten years.

He released such as "Xiaomai goes into the city", "Mancang goes into the city", "Fugen goes into the city", "Singing the Battle", "The Beast Train", "My Mother Xiaocao Tian ", "Confused county magistrate Zheng Banqiao", "My little aunt", "Happy pedestrian street", "Peach blossoms still laugh at the spring breeze", "Forty years we walked", "I am afraid I can't come" and so on.

They have been broadcast by various satellite television in China.

== Biography ==
In 2002, he worked as an account manager and operations director at Sunshine TV.

In 2004, he began to devote himself to the Chinese film and television industry and founded Beijing Times Light Shadow Culture Media Co., Ltd. He has successively invested in shooting and issuing many well-known TV dramas. Among them, the "Going into the city series", that is, "Xiaomai goes into the city", "Mancang goes into the city", "Fugen goes into the city", can be said to have created the 2.0 era of rural TV dramas in China in recent years.

The TV series "Mancang goes into the City" was broadcast on Shandong satellite TV, Henan satellite TV, Liaoning satellite TV, and Hebei satellite TV one after another. It has won the first place in prime time TV viewing for provincial satellite TV and won the Best TV contribution Award for the 2015 Southern TVS NIGHT." Xiaomai goes into the city" won the Best TV contribution Award and the most quality Award for Shanghai SMG TV series. As the final part of the going into the city series, "Fugen goes into the city" won the "Outstanding TV Series production Company Award" at the 2016 Southern TVS NIGHT.

In the television industry, he attempted a new model, shooting and broadcasting at the same time, of Chinese TV drama production and broadcasting, And led the company team to shoot and produce the youth idol weekly drama, "Singing the Battle", which was exclusively released in Hunan Satellite TV Weekly Theater.

He produced a Chinese period war drama called "The Beast Train". It is called "China's version of the train robbery" and has been broadcast on Heilongjiang Satellite TV, Henan Satellite TV and Liaoning Satellite TV one after another.

The digital movie "Zorui Girl" was shown on the cinema and broadcast on movie channel of CCTV 6; "My mother Xiaocao Tian", which is the opening of the series of "Mothers" that he invested in, first broadcast on Shandong satellite TV and Anhui satellite TV during prime time. It has won the first place in Shandong Satellite TV's annual ratings and the second place in Anhui Satellite TV's annual ratings, and the third-ranked provincial satellite TV in the same period.

"Small Grass Green", which is a companion piece of "My Mother XiaocaoTian" and is produced by Wang Jin and is directed by the famous director Wang Zi and is starred by Wang Qian hua and Yu Zhen, was broadcast in Anhui Television and Shandong Satellite TV.

2018 is the 40th anniversary of reform and opening up. The TV series "Forty Years We Walked", which was planned and shoot by Wang Jin, was listed as "the key recommended TV series to celebrate the 40th anniversary of reform and opening up".

== Social Activities ==
- Member of the Capital Film and Television Production Association
- The global brand influence figures of the 2013 Global Brand Alliance
- In 2014, he was invited to participate in the North American International Television Festival in Miami, USA, and his company became a member.
- Member of the Great Love Without a Foundation
- In the 11th National Television Production Industry, he was selected as the "Top Ten TV Drama Producer"
- He served as a judge for the second "Good project selection in the eyes of 100 producers in the "Eagle Eye Craftsmanship List"

== Founding company ==
SG-Culture Media Co., Ltd. has invested, shoot and issued a large number of TV dramas. Since its establishment, "SG" has become a well-known film and television production company.

On November 25, 2016, SG- Culture Media Co., Ltd. officially listed on NEEQ.

== Representative Work ==
"Xiaomai goes into the city" is one of the trilogy of going into the city series, directed by Yao Yuan and starred by Qianhua Wang and Luo Gang. The drama focuses the conflicts between the rural women Xiaomai and her lover after entering the city on the period of the return of the Sent-down youth in the 1970s, and the inspirational story that she eventually worked hard to create her own world through honest labor.

"Mancang goes into the city" was starred by Xiaoguang, Che Xiao, Liyun Wang and others. The drama tells the tearful and inspirational love story between the young female intellectual Jingmei and the rural young man Mancang. The play was broadcast in Shandong, Liaoning, Henan, Hebei, and Xinjiang Satellite TV on December 4, 2014.

"Fugen goes into the city" was starred by Zhao Yi and Biyun Chai . The play focuses on a young rural youth who have been married since childhood, and have changed since the woman was admitted to college. Then Fugen began to enter the city, which led to a series of classic stories.

"Singing the Battle" is a weekly TV drama of Hunan Satellite TV. It is directed by Wang Zi and starred by idol stars such as Qin Lan, Yida Huang and Oho Ou.

"The Beast Train" is a new type of Second Sino-Japanese War work. It was broadcast in Heilongjiang Satellite TV, Henan Satellite TV and Liaoning Satellite TV in 2014.

The digital cinematography "Zorui Girl" was shown on the cinema and broadcast on movie channel of CCTV-Film.

"My Mother Xiaocao Tian " was broadcast in the first round of Shandong Satellite TV and Anhui Satellite TV.

"Confused county magistrate Zheng Banqiao" was broadcast on Zhejiang Television on March 22, 2017.

"Small Grass Green" expresses the time fate carried by the characters in the 1970s to 1990s, and fully expresses the inspirational spirit of being positive and not giving up to fate. It was broadcast on Anhui Satellite TV and Liaoning Satellite TV on December 29, 2016.

The story "My little aunt" tells the story of the destiny of two generations in an "art family" from the 1960s to the 1980s when is the special historical period. It was broadcast on Anhui Satellite TV and Shandong Satellite TV on December 6, 2017.

"The first shotgun" was launched in Shenyang on February 20, 2017, and it is a legendary story of a hero who uses the will and faith to fight back in the face of adversity.

"Peach blossoms still laugh at the spring breeze" was starred by 18 stars including Miao Pu, Chen Long, Guolin Zheng, Tongsheng Han, Du Yuan and Shao Feng, and it told the history of a generation of goddesses. It was broadcast in Anhui TV and Guizhou Satellite TV in August 2018.

"Forty years we walked" is adapted from Yongren's novel "Television", produced by the SG- Culture Media, directed by Wang Zi, starred by Jin Shijia, Biyun Chai, Li Mao, Xiaosa Xu and so on. It tells the story of the protagonist Feng Du, who was influenced by television in his childhood and grew into a successful TV producer step by step.

"I am afraid that I am too late" was produced by SG- Culture MediaCo., Ltd., Anhui Huaxing Media Co., Ltd., Qilu channel of Shandong Television, Jiangsu City United Film and Television Culture Co., Ltd. It tells the story that a group of Chinese workers were losing and struggling, frustrating and rising under the background of the reform of state-owned enterprises. It sings the noble character of the ordinary laborer represented by the protagonist Chunsheng Li, who is affectionate and righteous, dare to bear, and face difficulties. It shows the national spirit of the Chinese people, who are persevering and never give up.
