= Green Camel Bell =

Chinese environmental organization

Green Camel Bell (Chinese: 绿驼铃) was established on November 4, 2004, as the first civic environmental organization in the Gansu region in China.

It is devoted to environmental protection in western China, and it contributes to the improvement of the compromised and declining ecosystems of western China. GCB plays an active role in Gansu's environmental protection, environmental education, and the growth of local environmental organizations. In keeping with its constitution, purpose, and objectives, GCB has focused on the following work since its establishment:

- promoting environmental protection in Gansu
- adopting effective measures to resolve environmental problems in Gansu
- educating elementary and secondary school students in environmental protection
- promoting the development of environmental associations in Gansu's colleges and universities
- organizing training and capacity building projects for environmental volunteers

Since its establishment, Green Camel Bell has successfully conducted activities including "Fruit for Greeting Cards", the "Gansu Flash Design Contest for Environmental Protection", "A Green China Welcomes the Olympics – Protecting our Mother Rivers", the "Gansu College Students' Green Camps of 2005 and 2006", and the "Cropland Conversion to Forest and Grassland, and the College Students Forum".

In addition, GCB has completed the first and second "Saiga Antelope Horn Market Surveys", and has conducted a series of environmental education projects including "Environmental education in Minqin County", the "Antelope Car Environmental education Training Project", "Building an Environmental Education Base in Lanzhou", and "Speaking at the Lanzhou Zoo".

GCB has drawn up the first "Green Map" of Lanzhou and has published and distributed materials on environmental protection such as the "Green Camel Bell Newsletter" and the "Collected Works of the Gansu College Students' Green Camp".

GCB's current projects include the "Gansu Water Protection Project", the "Local Environmental Teaching Materials on Desertification in Minqin, Gansu Project", and the "Capacity Building Project for Environmental Organizations in Gansu".

== Environmental protection exchanges ==
- Environmental Education
- Local Environmental Teaching Materials on Desertification in Minqin, Gansu
- Speaking at the Lanzhou Zoo
- Green Map System
- Green Camel Bell Electronic Newsletter
- Communication with other Groups and Individuals

== Projects ==
- Gansu Water Environment Project
- Green Journalists' Salon
- Gansu College Students' Green Camp
- Saiga Antelope Horn Market Survey

== Capacity building ==
- Training and Practice
- Promoting the Growth of Environmental Associations in Local Colleges and Universities
- Advancing the Development of NGOs in Gansu

== Promoting public participation in policy and the public's right to know ==
- The May 29 Lanzhou Petrochemical Explosion
- Preserving the Trolleybuses of Lanzhou
