= China Care Foundation =

Non profit organization

- Formation: 2000
- Type: 501(c)(3) nonprofit
- Headquarters: (United States) Westport, Connecticut
- President: Matt Dalio
- Website: ChinaCare.org

China Care Foundation is a nonprofit organization that provides medical, social and educational programs for orphans with disabilities in China and gives college and high school students the opportunity to give back by fundraising and volunteering.

== History ==
China Care Foundation was founded by Matt Dalio in 2000 when he was 16 years old. Dalio, who grew up in Connecticut, spent a year in China when he was 11 years old and returned five years later to personally witness the conditions of orphans with special needs. He returned home and founded China Care Foundation. The organization provides medical care to special needs children to give them a chance for a brighter future.

== See also ==
- List of non-governmental organizations in the People's Republic of China
