= Silence (charity) =

Hong Kong non-governmental organisation

- Formation: July 2008
- Type: Non-governmental organisation
- Headquarters: Shek Kip Mei, Kowloon
- Leader: William Tang
- Website: www.silence.org.hk

Silence (Chinese: 龍耳) is a Hong Kong charity established in 2008. Its goal is to enable deaf and hard-of-hearing people to integrate more easily into mainstream society and gain opportunities to develop their potential, achieve self-fulfillment, and enjoy equal opportunities for development.

Following the Li Ching's suicide in March 2008, Siu Yat-chan and members of Li's family established Silence in July that year. The charity continues to promote the use of Hong Kong Sign Language and support the employment of deaf and hard-of-hearing people, including collaborating with private companies, government bodies, and schools to promote sign language use.

Silence also advocates for the rights and interests of the deaf community of Hong Kong. It also provides legal support to ensure that deaf people receive fair treatment and equal legal protection. It is a member of the Community Chest of Hong Kong, Hong Kong Council of Social Service, and the World Federation of the Deaf.

== Objectives ==
Silence promotes the use of sign language and understanding of deaf culture through sign language classes, sign language singing group performances, and lectures on deaf culture. It also collaborates with private companies and schools to promote sign language use. In addition, it supports the employment of deaf and hard-of-hearing people in various ways, including referring them to job opportunities. Other initiatives include sign language interpreter courses and partnerships with social enterprises to open restaurants.

Silence also advocates for the rights and interests of the deaf community. It promotes measures and services including flashing fire alarms, flashing doorbells, the 992 emergency SMS service, HKSOS, Project i-CARE (關匯計劃), and the MTR Care application (關愛共乘). It also advocates the use of transparent face masks to facilitate communication with deaf people, especially during the COVID-19 pandemic. Silence has submitted recommendations to the government on policy reforms, including changes to legal procedures to improve accessibility for deaf people. It has also met with Matthew Cheung, then Secretary for Labour and Welfare, to discuss the employment difficulties faced by deaf people.

== History ==
Silence was co-founded by a group of people with hearing impairments and volunteers following the suicide of Li Ching on 1 March 2008. The founding members included Li's family and Siu Yat-chan. The organization was formally established in July 2008. Its Chinese title 龍耳 (Jyutping: lung4 ji5), which literally means dragon ear, is a decomposition of the Chinese word for "deaf" or "deafness" 聾 (lung4). The name was taken from an article written by Li Ching during her secondary school years.

During its early years, Silence did not have a permanent office. It frequently encountered difficulties renting venues for activities, which affected the delivery of its services and programs. To address this problem, it applied to the Housing Department for a permanent office in 2010. By 2011, it had established the Vocational Support and Social Services Centre for People with Hearing Impairments in Pak Tin Estate, Shek Kip Mei. The centre was later renamed the Silence (Pak Tin) Integrated Service Center for the Deaf and Hard of Hearing (龍耳（白田）聾人及弱聽綜合服務中心), providing support services to members.

== Major initiatives ==
- In 2011, Silence provided sign language classes to a total of 100 frontline employees from six organizations: the Hong Kong Chinese Civil Servants' Association (華員會), Sino Group, the Immigration Department Volunteer Work Team, Link REIT, the Mutual Aid Association (Note: The Mutual Aid Association was established in May 1995 by a group of dedicated patients, healthcare professionals from Queen Elizabeth Hospital, and social workers as a mutual support organization for nasopharyngeal cancer patients. It was officially registered as a non-profit organization on 22 February 2004.) (伊利沙伯醫院互勉會), and the Sham Shui Po Police District. The program was sponsored by the Civic Education Fund (公民教育基金).
- In 2014, during the 2014 FIFA World Cup, Silence partnered with Olympian City to launch Sign Language Commentary for the World Cup. The initiative enabled deaf and hard-of-hearing people to understand real-time information about live matches through sign language, including tactical developments and unexpected incidents both on and off the field.
- In 2017, Silence launched the mobile application Silence Sign Language Translation Assistant (龍耳手譯寶), offering real-time video interpretation services.
- In 2018, Silence began providing sign language interpretation for the 7 p.m. nightly news on TVB Pearl. This was the first real-time sign language news program in the history of Hong Kong's free-to-air television broadcasting. Silence was the successful bidder for the service contract.

=== Legal support ===
Silence provides legal support to its deaf members and their families. Cases it has assisted with include the Chan Mei-wah case, the Law Chun-kit case, the Cheung Chung-kit case, the Liu Kai-nam case, and the case involving the Hospital Authority's failure to provide sign language interpretation. This support addresses legal issues affecting the deaf community and provides appropriate legal advice and assistance to ensure that their rights are respected and protected.

== SilenceTV ==
In 2014, Silence established SilenceTV (龍耳電視), Hong Kong's first online television channel based on sign language. Its purpose was to address the lack of sign language interpretation in Hong Kong's public broadcasting services and enable deaf and hard-of-hearing people to access current affairs, lifestyle, and entertainment information through an online platform. The channel primarily distributed programs through YouTube, Facebook, and the instant messaging application WhatsApp. Initially, it planned to update its content weekly. Topics included anti-scam information, travel, food, and ghost stories. It also sought to collaborate with different program hosts to produce sign language versions of entertainment programs.

SilenceTV officially launched on YouTube on December 4, 2014. Its first broadcast was a short video introducing the dangers of pyramid-selling schemes, intended to raise awareness of related scams among people with hearing impairments.

== Chairman ==
- Polly Lam (2008–2010)
- Mandy Tang (2010–2012)
- Amy Bou (2012–2013)
- William Tang (2013–present)

== Committee member ==
- Siu Yat-chan
