= Shanghai Young Bakers =

Charity program

Shanghai Young Bakers (SYB) is a nonprofit program based in Shanghai, China providing a fully sponsored training in French and Chinese bakery and pastry to disadvantaged Chinese youth from 17 to 23 years of age. The goal is to allow them to find qualified jobs in the bakery-pastry making sector and lead an independent life after graduation.

== History ==
Shanghai Young Bakers was initiated in 2008 as a social innovation project by the French Junior Economic Chamber of Shanghai. A group of 12 French people, who had been living in China for a few years, wished to contribute a meaningful project to the country that had welcomed them. Inspired by a social bakery La Boulangerie Française in Huế, Vietnam, they discovered that there was a high demand for French bakery in China as well, due to the rapid growth of bakeries and 4/5 stars hotels. The project was officially launched in February 2009 with the first batch of 16 students. Initially six-months long, the training now lasts one year.

Since 2021, the project was handed over to Shanghai Ruifeng welfare center. Today, Jiajia Wang, the Executive Director of SYB and President of Ruifeng Welfare Center, collaborate with other staff, interns and volunteers of different nationalities to build a fully-sponsored vocational training program in French bakery for marginalized Chinese youth.

== Training ==
SYB students, who come from all over China, undergo a year of intense vocational training. Shanghai Young Bakers cooperates with a network of local and international partner NGOs which recommend students based on their financial background and motivation to pursue a career in bakery. The program accepts up to 32 students per year to ensure that a high-quality training is provided.

The SYB program is based on learning and working alternation system with two weeks of bakery/pastry class and two weeks of interning at international hotels. It is based on the French professional diploma Certificat d'aptitude professionnelle (CAP), as developed by the Ecole Française de Boulangerie et Patisserie d’Aurillac. Given that, the curriculum and exams are designed under the supervision of EFBPA.

The students also learn how to make Chinese-style breads and pastries, a curriculum that is taught at the Shanghai Caoyang Vocational School. Within the one-year program, students attain both basic and intermediate levels of the official Western Bakery diploma, awarded by the Shanghai Labor Bureau and recognized throughout China. The training also includes theory classes covering topics such as ingredients composition and nutrition, food quality and safety and workplace hygiene.

In addition to that, SYB offers its students English and life skills classes which are vital to further the graduates' career development opportunities.

== Social enterprise ==
Since 2011, the program has created a social enterprise that offers a range of commercial services whose proceeds go to the charity program. Among the services available are catering, teambuilding activities, public baking and pastry classes, DIY workshops for kids, and consulting services for F&B professionals.
