= Global Environmental Institute =

Chinese-based organization centered on environmental issues

- Abbreviation: GEI
- Founded: 2004
- Type: Civil non-enterprise unit
- Headquarters: Beijing, China
- Location: Beijing, China
- Website: www.geichina.org

The Global Environmental Institute (GEI) was founded in the U.S. in 2003 and was registered as an independent non-profit organization in the State of Delaware. GEI's mission was to design and implement market-based models for solving environmental problems in order to achieve development that is economically, ecologically, and socially sustainable. GEI was dissolved in October 2011. GEI's sister organization, the independent Beijing Chaoyang District Sustainable Global Environmental Institute in China (GEI-China) remains active.

== GEI-China's mission and strategy ==
GEI-China is an independent Chinese environmental non-profit, non-governmental organization and think tank that was established in Beijing, China in 2004. GEI-China shares GEI's mission to design and implement market-based models for solving environmental problems in order to achieve development that is economically, ecologically, and socially sustainable.

GEI-China was founded on these principles and specifically aims to:

- Achieve self-sustaining and ecologically sound rural development by linking local communities directly with outside partners in areas such as biodiversity conservation, renewable energy, and organic agriculture.
- Mitigate global warming and increase energy conservation by commercializing environmental technology, fostering sustainable enterprises, and developing innovative business and financing models.
- Develop the capacity of leaders and civil society to design, implement, and enforce sound social and ecological development policies in both rural and urban contexts, as well as all industrial sectors in China and around the world.
- Integrate environmental and economic problem-solving in China by facilitating local and international collaborations between government agencies, research institutions, private enterprises, and NGOs.

GEI-China has worked extensively in the fields of rural energy, biodiversity conservation, energy efficiency in industry and environmental governance in China. In particular, it has made significant headway in spurring on unofficial, bilateral talks on climate change between the United States and China (please see page 3 of the latter reference).

GEI-China is one of a small number of NGOs based in China, and works closely with a number of important government and academic institutions in China (including the Ministry of Environmental Protection, State Forestry Administration, Tibet Development Fund and Tsinghua University).

== Programs ==
GEI-China's work falls into four main program areas: Sustainable Rural Development, Biodiversity Conservation, Energy and Climate Change and Environmental Governance.

GEI-China's Sustainable Rural Development program works to incorporate successful commercial models to the development of rural communities. In particular, its projects focus clean renewable energy at the household and village level (e.g. biogas, solar cookers) as well as organic farming and rural finance. Project sites include Lijiang, Yunnan Province, the Tibet Autonomous Region and Chebaling Nature Reserve in Guangdong Province (with UNESCO) in China, as well as five provinces in Sri Lanka.

The Biodiversity Conservation program at GEI-China works to spur economic development of communities living near the buffer zones of nature reserves and promoting financial models that resolve conflicts between biodiversity conservation and local economic development. GEI has worked closely with county and provincial level governments to promote the Conservation Incentive Agreements model in the Fengtongzhai Nature Reserve in Baoxing County, Sichuan Province. In addition, the program team has worked with the Chinese government and Chinese timber enterprises in the publication and promotion of the "Guidelines on Sustainable Overseas Silviculture by Chinese Enterprises" (see below).

GEI-China's Energy and Climate Change program works towards the development of clean energy and energy efficient enterprises through market-oriented solutions. Its work in this area has included the promotion of energy service companies (ESCos) and capacity building for Clean Development Mechanism (CDM) projects in China, particularly in the cement industry for energy efficiency retro-fitting. GEI-China has also provided training subsidium for Chinese enterprises under their Eco-Entrepreneurship Training Project.

The use of energy efficiency in China's metallurgy industry and models for the bulk procurement of energy efficient products and technology has also been actively encouraged in selected Chinese cities. In addition, GEI has worked closely with Chinese and US government institutions to promote unofficial dialogue and cooperation on climate change (see article below).

Finally, GEI-China's Environmental Governance program works to provide capacity building on sustainable development for China's high-level decision makers, and to this effect it has worked closely with China's Central Communist Party School. The team also works to improve the environmental behavior of Chinese enterprises operating overseas through application of environmental tools such as Environmental Impact Assessment and payment for ecosystem services. In addition, it works closely with host countries to strengthen environmental policy. GEI is currently working with the Lao National Land Management Authority to strengthen its land management law and enforcement.

During the 2009 United Nations Climate Change Conference, Madame Jiaman Jin, executive director of GEI-China, said that GEI will continue to follow the climate action framework set up by the Center for Climate Strategies, placing greater emphasis on the provincial and city prefecture level in China. In addition, GEI-China will actively facilitate South-South collaboration on rural energy, particularly on technologies like biogas, solar energy and energy efficient stoves.

Through the years, GEI-China has worked to develop local capacity, both by supporting and incubating new NGOs and training current and future government leaders through an environmental curriculum at the Central Party School of the Chinese Communist Party.

== Partners ==
GEI-China has worked with a number of enterprises, government agencies and NGOs in implementing its projects. These include:

- National Development and Reform Commission (China)
- Ministry of Environmental Protection (China)
- State Forestry Administration (China)
- Blue Moon Fund
- Carnegie Endowment for International Peace
- Rockefeller Brothers Fund
- Worldwatch Institute, with the regular coordination of articles for the China Watch environmental news digest

The GEI-China Partnership Program assists international NGOs in developing environmental protection efforts in China and provides a platform for Chinese organizations and leaders to interact with and learn from environmental efforts of those outside of China. Some of these programs include:

GEI-China – Innovation Center for Energy and Transportation Partnership

The Innovation Center for Energy and Transportation (iCET), originally known as Auto Project on Energy and Climate Change, was launched in 2005 and aims to promote clean and energy efficient transportation technology and stringent fuel efficiency and vehicle emission regulations in China. iCET has now become an independent NGO that continues to receive financial and technical consulting from GEI.

GEI-China – Green River Partnership: Three Rivers Migration Study Project

In 2005, GEI-China and the Green River Environmental Protection Organization of Sichuan Province organized to implement the Three Rivers Migration Study. This partnership aims to facilitate public understanding of the regions changes, monitor government action and to develop information and recommendations to help the government improve its migration policy.

== GEI-Americas ==
GEI-Americas (GEI-A) constituted the Americas-based program operations of GEI. GEI-A helped local entrepreneurs in emerging countries such as Brazil, China, and Peru develop sustainable enterprises that built on American entrepreneurial values and rewarded the conservation of rural ecosystems rich in biological diversity while leveraging economic transformations that open pathways for improvements in livelihoods for rural communities local to these regions.

== Publications ==
- "Comments on China's Policies and Actions Addressing Climate Change" (PDF).
- "Guidelines on Sustainable Overseas Silviculture by Chinese Enterprises".
