= Terma Foundation =

Health Program

- Founded: 1993
- Type: Non-profit
- Fields: Health care
- Website: http://www.terma.org

The Terma Foundation was founded in 1993 as the Tibet Child Nutrition Project (TCNP), by Dr. Nancy S. Harris and now implements public health programs including nutrition, education, primary and preventive health care, acknowledging traditional belief systems, and integrating low-tech, low-cost western technology where appropriate in Tibet.

Terma's work in the Tibet Autonomous Region and adjacent ethnic Tibetan areas of the People's Republic of China is carried out by a multidisciplinary coalition of Tibetans, Chinese, and Westerners in successful cooperation with PRC nationals and local health authorities.

Dr. Harris gained notoriety when she published an article in the New England Journal of Medicine with the results of her study on stunted growth in the Himalaya region. She measured 2,500 children in rural villages and concluded that malnutrition was the cause rather than altitude, as previously suspected. To aid their work with local communities, the organization conducted a systematic study on the effectiveness of traditional Tibetan medicine in preventing and treating child health problems. They also studied the impact of vitamins and sunlight exposure in preventing rickets. The foundation's field operations, based in Lhasa, now reach an estimated 300,000 child and community beneficiaries each year.

The objectives of the foundation include:

• Focusing on the health and welfare of children, women, and the elderly who maintain indigenous values while confronting contemporary challenges;

• Promoting environmentally appropriate traditional agriculture, consumption of high nutrient indigenous foods, and cultivation of Tibetan herbs;

• Supporting educational programs in public health, literacy, vocational training, the arts, and international education exchange;

• Developing microeconomic initiatives at the grassroots level which will sustain the local health infrastructure; and

• Facilitating interaction between Tibetans and other indigenous communities internationally and on issues relating to health, education, and the environment.
