= Heart to Heart Community Care =

Non-governmental charity in China

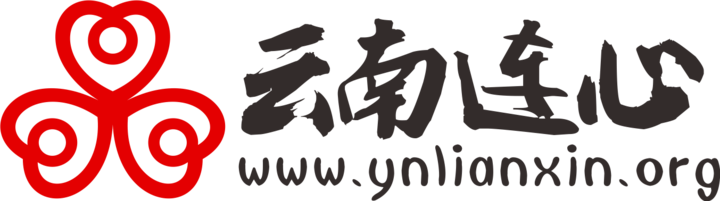
- Founded: 2005
- Type: NGO
- Purpose: Migrant workers, community development
- Location: Kunming, Yunnan, China
- Revenue: 700,000RMB (approx. $103,000) (as of 2010)
- Employees: 21 (as of 2010)
- Website: www.ynlianxin.org
- Formerly called: (Chinese name) 云南连心社区照顾服务中心

Heart to Heart Community Care (Chinese: 云南连心社区照顾服务中心; pinyin: Yúnnán liánxīn shèqū zhàogù fúwù zhōngxīn) is a non-profit, non-governmental charity in Kunming, Yunnan Province, China which provides services to migrant workers and their families. Registered in December, 2005 with the Yunnan Department of Civil Affairs, Heart to Heart uses a community-based social service approach, and in addition to providing a broad range of services, also participates in research and policy advocacy.

== Mission ==
Heart to Heart's mission is “to develop a caring, tolerant, supportive and integrated society in conjunction with and for the migrant worker community.” Within the migrant worker community, Heart to Heart specifically targets women, children, elderly, disabled people, and other disadvantaged groups.

== Methods and organization ==
Heart to Heart utilizes a broad-based social work approach to helping migrants, and focuses on facilitating community involvement in its work. The organization works to integrate all available resources pertaining to migrant workers, such as the government, large foundations, community organizations, and volunteers, and approaches issues on case-by-case, small group, community-wide, and broader societal level bases. Its main goals are the direct provision of services to migrant workers, research on issues relating to migrant workers in Kunming, and policy advocacy.

The organization's structure and mission is broken up into ten major focuses, which comprise three larger branches of the organization: Children's Services, Comprehensive Community Services, and Research Advocacy and Training. The Children's Services branch includes a Children's Activities Center, Outreach Services, and Community School Work. The Comprehensive Community Services’ branch consist of a Women's Cooperative Development Organization, Domestic Violence Intervention, a Migrant Worker Legal Rights Station, Minority Social Work, and Elderly Social Work. The Research Advocacy and Training branch includes Research and Policy Advocacy and a Professional Training Center.

As of 2010, Heart to Heart had twenty-one staff members, including eight full-time social workers. Additionally, the organization employs researchers and social workers from various colleges and universities, and makes use of many volunteers to support the organization's services.

== Services ==
=== Children’s services ===
Heart to Heart runs a Children's Activities Center in the middle of a migrant settlement in Kunming. The activities center provides after-school care, toys, a library, volunteer tutors, after-school classes, and interest groups. Heart to Heart also organizes children's events, such as games and movie nights, sponsors weekend family outings for migrant worker families, and visits local schools. An additional focus of the organization is promoting child safety. Heart to Heart works with local police, the local government, and the surrounding community to develop strategies to ensure the safety of migrant worker children, and also runs a personal safety awareness education program for children. Past initiatives have included a 2010 community activities series entitled “Migrant Children Safety Awareness,” and a 2009-2010 initiative entitled “Using Community Outreach Methods to Explore Child Safety Services."

=== Outreach activities ===
Heart to Heart organizes community events on weekends, holidays, and over the summer, both for migrant workers and for the broader community. Through these events, the organization aims to connect migrant workers and also to educate the broader community about the issues facing migrant workers in order to overcome existing prejudices within society. Heart to Heart's mobile service unit allows the organization to spread its work into other migrant communities located further away; additionally, two or three times each week Heart to Heart's social workers are sent to visit rural villages outside the city.

=== Recycling efforts / women’s cooperative development ===
==== Recycling Resource Center ====
Heart to Heart's Recycling Resource Center collects donations of used goods and employs migrant workers to sort and clean the donated items. Some of these goods are then used in the Green Handicraft Workshop, while others are sold in the Mutual Aid Shop.

==== Green Handicraft Workshop ====
The Green Handicraft Workshop employs migrant women, training them in handicrafts such as sewing and embroidery, and providing them with a source of employment. In the workshop, the women draw from ethnic designs to create goods for public sale; additionally, the women can bring their children along with them when they work.

==== Mutual Aid Shop ====
The Mutual Aid Shop sells second-hand goods to migrant workers at low prices. Additionally, Heart to Heart works to create community awareness of “green collar” workers—workers (many of whom are migrant workers) who work in the trash collection sector. The organization believes that by increasing the public's awareness and knowledge about the sorts of jobs these workers perform, the public will afford these workers greater respect and also be more likely to participate in recycling efforts.

=== Domestic violence intervention ===
One strategy Heart to Heart employs involves providing direct services within individual households. In cases of domestic violence, Heart to Heart sends social workers to migrant families’ homes to provide counseling for the whole family.

=== Research and policy advocacy ===
Heart to Heart regularly supports researchers from various colleges and universities interested in studying issues related to migrant workers, and also advocates for policies they deem will alleviate problems migrant workers face. In 2010, the organization prepared a requested report for the Provincial Women's Federation containing research and policy advice.

== Social Enterprise: Heart 2 Heart International Youth Hostel ==
Heart 2 Heart International Youth Hostel is an affiliated project of Heart to Heart Community Care. Located near the village of Tuan Jie, approximately thirty kilometers outside of Kunming, this hostel is used by Heart to Heart Community Care as a training base and recreational facility. The hostel is run on a for-profit basis, with its proceeds going solely toward funding Heart to Heart's charitable services. The building which houses the hostel was originally built by a Bai family in 1984, according to traditional Bai minority architecture, and previously housed four generations of twelve families of Bai ethnic minority people, before falling into disrepair. Since then, the exterior of the building has been repaired and conserved, and the interior has been converted into guestrooms. The main hall of the building has been left untouched in order to show guests the traditional interior of the house.

In addition to guestrooms, the hostel's grounds contain an amphitheater, a sixty to eighty person conference room, a camp site, a courtyard, a library, and an exhibition about the history of the town and the surrounding area. The hostel also offers bikes for daily rent.

The hostel's environmental efforts include making furniture, such as bedside tables, out of reused and refitted materials, and offering recycling receptacles for bottles, tins, cans, papers, batteries, plastic bags, bottle tops, eggshells, and washing water. Furthermore, 60% of the hostel's hot water is heated by solar power, and 98% of its lights are energy saving or LED.

Heart 2 Heart International Youth Hostel is the first youth hostel in China that also provides social work to the surrounding rural community (which consists largely of ethnic minority members). The hostel's other service initiatives include hosting educational and cultural activities, workshops, and classes, including nature education programs, for the surrounding community, visitors, and companies and organizations. Additionally, the land surrounding the hostel is used to grow organic crops.

== Funders and partners ==
Heart to Heart Community Care is funded by and works collaboratively with the Yunnan Provincial Women's Federation and Oxfam Hong Kong.The organization receives additional funding from Hong Kong Zheng Sheng College and the International Labour Organization. Other partners of the organization include the Yunnan Department of Civil Affairs, the Yunnan University Public School of Management Social Work Research Institute, and the Yunnan University—Hong Kong Polytechnic Institute Social Design and Development Research Center. Heart to Heart additionally collaborates with local community partners in Kunming, including private schools, neighborhood committees, and the police force.

Heart 2 Heart International Youth Hostel is a member of the Youth Hostel Association of China, which is a member of Hostelling International, and is also partnered with Yunnan University, Hong Kong Polytechnic University, Taiwan Catholic University, the University of Alabama, and the University of Chicago.

== Awards ==
- Social Organization Implementation Through Study of Scientific Outlook on Development Activity Advanced Unit Award (China National Ministry of Civil Affairs), 2010
- One Foundation • Tencent Potential Model Award and the One Foundation Service Innovation Award—only community organization nationwide to receive two awards, 2010
- Poverty Alleviation Innovative Action Award and Outreach Method Safety Education Award—only community organization nationwide to receive two awards (China Merchants), 2010
- 2008-2010 Yunnan Collective for the People's War Against Drugs Award, 2011
- Drug Prohibition and AIDS Prevention Advanced Unit Award (Yunnan Provincial People's Government Chinese Communist Party), 2011
- National Grass-Roots Model Example Children's Home (Ministry of Education, National Women's Federation, and Central Civilization Office), 2012
- Employee Li Jun selected as a “2012 Ginkgo Partner” (Narada Foundation Ginkgo Growth Partnership), 2012
- First National Outstanding Professional Social Work Service Third Prize (National Ministry of Civil Affairs), 2012
- Top Ten Workers’ Family Construction Unit (Wuhua District Labor Union), 2012
- First Place National Volunteer Job Case Award (National Ministry of Civil Affairs), 2013
- International Cooperation Award of Excellence (National Women's Federation, Beijing Office of the International Labour Organization), 2013
- Gold Medal Implementation Category Project (awarded by the Second National Charity Contest for its entries “Heart to Heart—Kunming Migrant Children Care for Life Service Vehicle” and “City Safety Angel Caravan”), 2013

=== Heart 2 Heart International Youth Hostel Awards ===
- Creating Charity Project Bronze Award (Second China National Charity Contest), 2013
