= Jing Wang (professor) =

American media scholar (1950–2021)

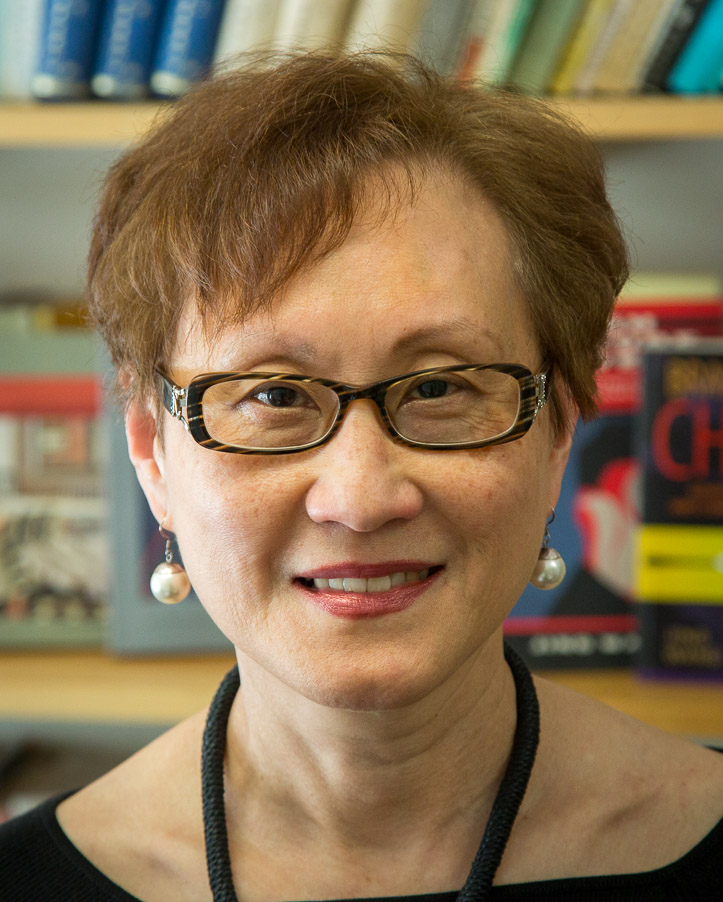
- Died: 25 July 2021
- Alma mater: National Taiwan University
- Occupation: Academic staff
- Employer: Duke University; Massachusetts Institute of Technology

Jing Wang (王瑾; 1950 – July 25, 2021) was Professor of Chinese media and Cultural Studies and S.C. Fang Professor of Chinese Language & Culture at Massachusetts Institute of Technology. She was jointly appointed to MIT's Comparative Media Studies and Global Studies & Languages.

After a bachelor's degree from National Taiwan University, Wang studied comparative literature at University of Michigan before earning her doctorate at the University of Massachusetts. She began her teaching career at Duke University, where she was on the faculty for 16 years. Her 1992 monograph The Story of Stone: Intertextuality, Ancient Chinese Stone Lore, and the Stone Symbolism in Dream of the Red Chamber, Water Margin, and The Journey to the West won the Joseph Levenson Prize for the year's best book on premodern China.

Jing Wang was the founder and organizer of MIT's New Media Action Lab. In spring 2009, Wang launched an NGO2.0.

Wang started working with Creative Commons in 2006 and served as the chair of the international advisory board of Creative Commons Mainland China. She was appointed to serve on the advisory board for Wikimedia Foundation in 2010. She served on the editorial and advisory boards of ten academic journals in the US, Australia, Taiwan, Hong Kong, and the UK.

Wang died in Boston, July 25, 2021, aged 71.

== Analysis ==
In her work on non-grovernmental organizations, describes many Chinese NGOs as engaged in a "nonconfrontational activism" and existing in a "gray zone between the legitimate and the illegitimate."

Wang advocates developing complex and unbiased understanding of rights and freedoms in China, cautioning against Western discourses' "fixation with Chinese censors, as if people in the Middle Kingdom have only two choices - being brainwashed or becoming dissidents."

== Candy R. Wei Memorial Scholarship ==
Jing Wang's daughter Candy R. Wei died by suicide at the age of 20. Jing Wang and Candy's father, Young Wei, established a travel scholarship fund at the University of Michigan School of Art & Design in 2001 to commemorate their daughter. The recipients of this fund made individual contributions to Wikipedia by submitting works inspired during their study abroad.

== Books ==
- The Other Digital China: Nonconfrontational Activism on the Social Web, Harvard University Press, 2019.
- Brand New China: Advertising, Media, and Commercial Culture, Harvard University Press, 2008.
- High Culture Fever: Politics, Aesthetics, and Ideology in Deng's China, University of California Press, 1996.
- The Story of Stone: Intertextuality, Ancient Chinese Stone Lore, and the Stone Symbolism of "Dream of the Red Chamber," "Water Margin," and "Journey to the West." Duke University Press, 1992.

=== Edited ===
- Locating China: Space, Place, and Popular Culture. In the series of "China in Transition" (ed. David SG Goodman). London and New York: Routledge, 2005. Paperback edition, 2006.
- With Tani Barlow, Cinema and Desire: Feminist Marxism and the Cultural Politics in the Work of Dai Jinhua. New York & London: Verso Books. 2002.
- Chinese Popular Culture and the State, a Special Issue for Positions: East Asia Cultures Critique, 9:1 (Spring 2001). [Nominated for the 2001 MLA Council of Editors of Learned Journals Award for the category of the Best Special Issue].
- China's Avant-Garde Fiction: An Anthology. Durham and London: Duke University Press, 1998.[Second Printing, 2004].
