= List of charitable foundations =

This is a list of notable charitable foundations.

== A ==
- AARP Foundation
- Acorns Children's Hospice
- Action Against Hunger
- ActionAid
- Acumen
- Adelson Foundation
- Adventist Development and Relief Agency
- Aerospace Heritage Foundation of Canada
- Ajmal Foundation
- Aleh Negev
- Alex's Lemonade Stand Foundation
- Alexander S. Onassis Foundation
- Allegheny Foundation
- Al Manahil Welfare Foundation Bangladesh
- Al-Markazul Islami
- The Alliance for Safe Children
- American Academy in Rome
- American Heart Association
- American Himalayan Foundation
- American India Foundation
- American Indian College Fund
- American Near East Refugee Aid
- American Red Cross
- Amici del Mondo World Friends Onlus
- Amref Health Africa
- Andrew W. Mellon Foundation
- Armenia Fund
- Asbestos Disease Awareness Organization
- The Asia Foundation
- Athena Fund
- Atlantic Philanthropies
- Aythos
- Azim Premji Foundation

== B ==
- Baan Gerda
- Beckstrand Cancer Foundation
- Belarus Solidarity Foundation
- Best Friends Animal Society
- Bharat Sevashram Sangha
- Big Brothers Big Sisters of America
- Big Brothers Big Sisters of Canada
- Big Brothers Big Sisters of New York City
- Bill & Melinda Gates Foundation
- Bilqees Sarwar Foundation
- Blessing Bethlehem
- Bloomberg Philanthropies
- Bluey Day Foundation
- Born This Way Foundation
- Boys & Girls Clubs of America
- Bread for the World
- Bremen Overseas Research and Development Association
- British Heart Foundation
- Burroughs Wellcome Fund
- Bush Foundation

== C ==
- CAFOD
- Calouste Gulbenkian Foundation
- Campaign for Liberty
- The Canadian International Learning Foundation
- Cancer Research UK
- CanTeen
- Cardiac Risk in the Young
- CARE
- Caritas
- Carter Center
- Carthage Foundation
- Casa Pia
- Catholic Charities USA
- Catholic Relief Services
- CBM (formerly Christian Blind Mission)
- Cesvi
- Child In Need Institute
- Child Watch Phuket
- Child's Play
- Children at Risk
- Children in Need
- Children International
- Children of Peace International
- Children's Defense Fund
- Children's Development Trust
- The Children's Investment Fund Foundation
- Children's Miracle Network Hospitals
- Children's National Medical Center
- Christian Care Foundation for Children with Disabilities
- Christian Children's Fund of Canada
- Church World Service
- The Citizens Foundation
- City Sikhs
- City Year
- Clinton Foundation
- Comic Relief
- Community Network Projects
- Compassion Can't Wait
- Compassion International
- Confetti Foundation
- Conrad N. Hilton Foundation
- Counterpart International
- Creative Services Support Group
- The Crohn's and Colitis Foundation of Canada
- Cystic Fibrosis Foundation

== D ==
- Daniels Fund
- David and Lucile Packard Foundation
- David Suzuki Foundation
- Direct Relief
- Do Something
- Dream Center
- Drosos Foundation
- Dubai Cares
- The Duke Endowment

== E ==
- East Meets West
- Edhi Foundation
- Elizabeth Associations
- Engineers Without Borders
- Epilepsy Foundation
- Epilepsy Outlook
- Eppley Foundation
- Eye Care Foundation

== F ==
- Feeding America
- Feed My Starving Children
- FINCA International
- Food Allergy Initiative
- Food Not Bombs
- Ford Foundation
- The Foundation for a Better Life
- Foundation for Child Development
- The Fred Hollows Foundation
- Fremont Area Community Foundation
- Friedrich Ebert Stiftung
- Fritt Ord
- Fund for Reconciliation and Development
- Fundacion Manantiales

== G ==
- Garfield Weston Foundation
- GEFEK
- George S. and Dolores Doré Eccles Foundation
- German Foundation for World Population
- Gill Foundation
- Girl Scouts of the USA
- The Global Fund to Fight AIDS, Tuberculosis and Malaria
- GlobalGiving
- Global Greengrants Fund
- Global H2O
- Global Village Foundation
- Gordon and Betty Moore Foundation
- Grassroots Business Fund
- Greenpeace

== H ==
- Habitat for Humanity
- Hafezzi Charitable Society of Bangladesh
- Hands on Network
- Hands on Tzedakah
- Heal the World Foundation
- Health World Inc.
- Heart to Heart International
- Heifer International
- Helen Keller International
- Heritage Action
- The Heritage Foundation
- High Fives Foundation
- Holt International Children's Services
- Hope Educational Foundation
- Howard Hughes Medical Institute
- Humanity & Inclusion (formerly Handicap International)

== I ==
- The Idries Shah Foundation
- IHH (Turkish NGO)
- Imam Khomeini Relief Foundation
- Inheritance of Hope
- International Children Assistance Network
- International Federation of Red Cross and Red Crescent Societies
- International Foundation for Electoral Systems
- International Fund for Animal Welfare
- International Literacy Foundation
- International Medical Corps
- International Planned Parenthood Federation
- International Republican Institute
- International Resources for the Improvement of Sight
- International Union for Conservation of Nature
- Invisible Children, Inc.
- Islamic Relief
- ISSO Seva

== J ==
- J. Paul Getty Trust
- Jane Goodall Institute
- Jesse's Journey
- Jesuit Refugee Service
- Jewish Community Center
- John A. Hartford Foundation
- John D. and Catherine T. MacArthur Foundation

== K ==
- Kidney Education Foundation
- Kin Canada
- Knut and Alice Wallenberg Foundation
- Konrad Adenauer Foundation
- The Kresge Foundation

== L ==
- La Caixa
- Laidlaw Foundation
- The Lawrence Foundation
- LDS Humanitarian Services
- Legal Education Foundation
- The Leona M. and Harry B. Helmsley Charitable Trust
- Lepra
- Li Ka Shing Foundation
- Libra Foundation
- Lifeline Express
- Lilly Endowment
- Lions Clubs International
- Long Covid Kids
- Lunches for Learning

== M ==
- Make-A-Wish Foundation
- Malteser International
- Marie Stopes International
- Marion G. Wells Foundation
- Mastercard Foundation
- Material World Charitable Foundation
- Maybach Foundation
- McKnight Foundation
- Médecins du Monde
- Médecins Sans Frontières (Doctors Without Borders)
- Mercy Corps
- Michael & Susan Dell Foundation
- Mohammed bin Rashid Al Maktoum Foundation
- Movimento Sviluppo e Pace
- Multiple Sclerosis Foundation

== N ==
- National Collegiate Cancer Foundation
- Nemours Foundation
- Network for Good
- New Brunswick Innovation Foundation
- Nimmagadda Foundation
- Nippon Foundation
- Nobel Foundation
- Norwegian Mission Alliance
- NYRR Foundation

== O ==
- Oaktree
- Omar-Sultan Foundation
- ONS Foundation
- Operation Blessing International
- Operation Smile
- Operation USA
- Opportunity International
- Oral Cancer Foundation
- Orbis International
- Ormiston Trust
- Oxfam

== P ==
- The Pew Charitable Trusts
- Pin-ups for Vets
- Plan International
- Puppy Up Foundation

== R ==
- Ratanak International
- Realdania
- Redthread
- Refresh Bolivia
- Reggio Children Foundation
- REHASWISS
- Ripples Foundation
- Robert Bosch Stiftung
- Robert Wood Johnson Foundation
- Rockefeller Brothers Fund
- Rockefeller Foundation
- Rotary Foundation
- Royal Flying Doctor Service of Australia
- Royal London Society for Blind People
- Royal Society for the Prevention of Cruelty to Animals
- Royal Society for the Protection of Birds

== S ==
- Saint Camillus Foundation
- The Salvation Army
- Samaritan's Purse
- Samsara Foundation
- Santa Casa da Misericórdia
- Save the Children
- Save the Manatee Club
- Scaife Family Foundation
- SCARE for a CURE
- Schowalter Foundation
- Serving Charity
- Silicon Valley Community Foundation
- Simone and Cino Del Duca Foundation
- Sir Dorabji Tata and Allied Trusts
- SKIP of New York
- Smile Train
- Societat de Beneficència de Naturals de Catalunya
- Society of Saint Vincent de Paul
- Solihten Institute
- Somaly Mam
- SOS Children's Villages
- SOS Children's Villages – UK
- SOS Children's Villages – USA
- Sparebankstiftelsen DnB
- St. Baldrick's Foundation
- St. Jude Children's Research Hospital
- Starlight Children's Foundation
- Stichting INGKA Foundation
- Stone Family Foundation
- Students Helping Honduras
- Surdna Foundation
- Survivor Corps
- Susan G. Komen for the Cure
- SystemX
- SoldierStrong

== T ==
- Taproot Foundation
- The Book Thing
- Thrive Africa
- Tom Joyner Foundation
- Toys for Tots
- Traffic
- True Volunteer Foundation
- Tulsa Community Foundation

== U ==
- UNICEF
- United Methodist Committee on Relief
- United Nations Foundation
- United States Artists
- United Way Worldwide
- Universal Health Care Foundation of Connecticut

== V ==
- Vancouver Foundation
- Varkey Foundation
- Veniños
- Vietnam Veterans Memorial Fund
- Vietnam Veterans of America Foundation
- Virtu Foundation
- Voluntary Service Overseas
- Volunteers of America

== W ==
- The W. Garfield Weston Foundation
- W. K. Kellogg Foundation
- The Walter and Duncan Gordon Foundation
- Waste No Food
- WE Charity (formerly Free the Children)
- Wellcome Trust
- Wetlands International
- Wikimedia Foundation
- WildAid
- Wildlife Conservation Society
- William and Flora Hewlett Foundation
- The Winnipeg Foundation
- Woodrow Wilson National Fellowship Foundation
- World Association of Girl Guides and Girl Scouts
- World Literacy Foundation
- World Medical Relief
- World Scout Foundation
- World Transformation Movement
- World Vision International
- World Wide Fund for Nature
- Wounded Warrior Project
- Wyoming Wildlife Federation

== Y ==
- Young Lives
- Youth Entrepreneurs
- Youth with a Mission
- YouthBuild

== See also ==
- Charitable trust
- List of foundations in Canada
- List of water-related charities
- List of wealthiest charitable foundations
- Youth philanthropy
