= List of foundations in Canada =

This is a list of foundations in Canada. Foundations in Canada are registered charities. Under Canadian law, foundations may be public or private; as of 2021, they made up 12% of all registered charities in Canada. As of March 2021, Canada had 4,961 public foundations and 6,189 private.

Canadian foundations collectively form a very large asset base for philanthropy. In 2003, there were over 2,000 active grantmaking foundations in Canada, which had total assets of CA$12.5 billion and gave over $1 billion in grants that year. Annual foundation grants grew from over $3 billion in 2008 to $10.7 billion in 2023, when public and private foundations held about $160 billion in assets.

As of 2023, the largest foundation in Canada was the Mastercard Foundation, with total assets of about $55.8 billion.

== List ==
The following is a list of foundations in Canada that have at least CA$10 million in assets, as per their most recent Registered Charity Information Return with the Canada Revenue Agency.

Name	Assets (CAD)	Type
Atkinson Foundation	$77 million (2014)	
Azrieli Foundation	$1 billion (2014)	
British Columbia's Children's Hospital Foundation	$362 million (2015)	
Calgary Foundation	$750 million	
Canada Foundation for Innovation		
Canadian Race Relations Foundation		
Claridge Foundation	$45 million (2014)	
Community Foundation of Lethbridge and Southwestern Alberta	$26 million (2016)	
Crohn's and Colitis Foundation of Canada	$48 million	
David Suzuki Foundation	$16 million (2014)	
Donner Canadian Foundation	$120 million (2014)	
Edmonton Community Foundation, The	$140 million	
EJLB Foundation, The	$80 million	
Eldee Foundation	$15 million (2014)	
F.K. Morrow Foundation	$78 million (2014)	
Fondation du Grand Montréal	$83 million (2014)	
Fondation J. Armand Bombardier	$175 million (2015)	
Fondation J.-Louis Levesque	$50 million	
Fondation J.A. De Seve	$10 million	
Fondation Lucie et André Chagnon	$2.07 billion (2019)	
Fondation Marcelle et Jean Coutu	$220 million	
George Cedric Metcalf Charitable Foundation, The	$130 million	
Historica Foundation of Canada	unknown	
Hospital for Sick Children Foundation, The	$470 million	
Jewish Community Foundation of Montreal	$1.38 Billion	
John Dobson Foundation	$20 million	
J.P. Bickell Foundation	$70 million	
Judy and Paul Bronfman Charitable Foundation	$17.9 million (2014)	
J.W. McConnell Family Foundation	$470 million	
Kinnear Foundation	$30 million	
Laidlaw Foundation	$50 million	
Lawson Foundation	$70 million	
London Community Foundation	$68 million (2015)	
Macdonald Stewart Foundation, The	$50 million	
Manning Foundation		
Mastercard Foundation	$55.8 billion (2023)	private
Max Bell Foundation	$50 million	
Michael Smith Foundation for Health Research		
Molson Foundation, The	$30 million	
Muttart Foundation, The	$50 million	
New Brunswick Innovation Foundation	$35 million	
Peter Munk Charitable Foundation	$30 million	
Physicians' Services Incorporated Foundation	$99 million (2014)	
R. Howard Webster Foundation	$90 million	
Richard Ivey School of Business Foundation	$20.8 million (2015)	
Rick Hansen Foundation	13.6 million	
Saskatoon Community Foundation	$64.3 million	
Team Brother Bear	unknown	
The Winnipeg Foundation	$2.4 Billion (2024)	
Weston Family Foundation	$285 million (2014)	
Vancity Community Foundation	$49 million (2014)	
Vancouver Foundation	$986 million (2014)	
Walter and Duncan Gordon Foundation	$60 million	
