= Virtu Foundation =

American-based music education nonprofit

- Founded: 1998
- Purpose: Classical music Music education String instruments
- Location: Charlottesville, Virginia
- Region served: United States, Canada
- Method: Scholarships, donations, grants
- Key people: Curtis Peterson (President)
- Revenue: $148,837 (2015)
- Expenses: $23,797 (2015)
- Website: virtufound.org

The Virtu Foundation is a non-profit organization that supports higher level music education with a particular focus on string instruments. It organizes the donation or loan of high quality cellos, violas, and violins to the Foundation, so that they may be loaned to young musicians. The foundation's goal is to help young musicians develop advanced musical skills with experience of the use of high-quality instruments they could not otherwise afford.

Instruments are loaned to young musicians on Scholarships. When the terms of Scholarship loans expire, the instruments are placed with new musicians. Over 70 musicians have received such Scholarship loans since the foundation was established. Loans are made on a competitive basis to students from any country who reside in the United States or Canada. Recipients of these Scholarships currently include students at East Carolina University, Eastman School of Music, Juilliard School, New England Conservatory, and Princeton University.

The Virtu Foundation has also supported organizations committed to sustaining public performances of classical music, as well as classical music education programs. It is a tax-exempt non-profit organization.

== Scholarship program ==
The instruments are placed as two-year scholarships through periodic competitions. The selection process includes blind evaluations of musical competence, and consideration is given to financial resources, instrument need, and an estimate of the benefit which extended use of a better instrument would bring to a musician's career. The foundation bears the expense of acquiring or borrowing the instruments, and recipients make semi-annual contributions to a fund that insures that the instruments are well maintained.

== Mentor program ==
The foundation provides occasional support to community-based string teaching programs for children.

== See also ==
- List of charitable foundations
