= Bilqees Sarwar Foundation =

Pakistani not-for-profit organisation

- Formation: 2005; 21 years ago
- Founder: Farhan Sarwar
- Purpose: Healthcare, Education, Ambulance, Humanitarian Aid
- Headquarters: Lahore, Pakistan
- Region served: Globally
- Method: Donations and Grants
- Website: www.bsfoundation.com

The Bilqees Sarwar Foundation (BSF) is a registered non-profit organization based in Lahore, Pakistan, which provides public health and education support to the local community as well as around the world. It was established by the Sarwar family, and cooperates with NRS International, a Dubai-based disaster relief supplier with a manufacturing facility in Pakistan.

== Public Health Initiatives ==
=== Razia Begum Dialysis Centre at Bilqees Sarwar Hospital ===
The Bilqees Sarwar Hospital (BSH) provides the employees of the HSNDS factory, their family, and patients in Pakistan with free and subsidized healthcare; this includes 50 dialysis machines to use without a cost and free eye-care treatments ranging from laser vision correction to minor surgeries. Since its inception, the hospital has served a community of 500,000 citizens and treats up to 3,000 eye patients per month. The hospital offers a range of other services, including:

- Ophthalmology
- Complete lab testing facility
- Consulting general practitioner
- Ultrasound
- Electrocardiography (ECG)
- Pharmacy

In June, 2016 BSF established Razia Begum Dialysis Centre (RBDC) near Kahna, to treat patients with kidney disease free of charge. The centre provides free dialysis to up to 4,500 patients on a monthly basis, and has provided 5,792 dialysis treatment to date.

=== Mobile Clinic in Syrian Refugee Camps ===
BSF has supported Alseeraj for Development and Healthcare in order for it to continue its mobile medical clinic in Syrian refugee camps in eastern Lebanon.

=== Mayo Hospital Renovations ===
BSF has donated to several departments of Mayo Hospital in Punjab, Pakistan:

- Neurology Ward
- East Medical Ward (Male)
- East Medical Ward (Female)
- Nephrology Ward

== Education Initiatives ==
=== Scholarship Programmes ===
BSF has granted 77 scholarships worth US$33,398 to students at the Customs Public School in Lahore. The scholarship programme supports young students from the age of 3 to 13. BSF has also donated US$11,450 in the form of 40 scholarships to Sanjan Nagar Public Education Trust for impoverished students. BSF also partnered with The City School in Lahore to sponsor the 7th Annual City School Model United Nations Conference.

=== Bilqees Camp of Hope in Syria ===
The Bilqees Sarwar Foundation's parent company, NRS International, joined the Global Business Coalition for Education to extend their support towards the education of Syrian refugee children. NRS International, through BSF, has donated multi-purpose tents to serve as temporary learning spaces and homes for children to learn and live in.

== Humanitarian Assistance ==
=== Nepal Disaster Relief ===
In April 2015, when a devastating earthquake hit Nepal, NRS International, through BSF, provided over 400 core relief items and solar products to Nepalese earthquake victims.
