= Pin-ups for Vets =

American charitable organization

- Founded: 2006
- Founder: Gina Elise
- Location: Pin-Ups For Vets, P.O. Box 33 Claremont, California, United States 91711
- Region served: Worldwide
- Website: http://www.pinupsforvets.com

Pin-ups For Vets is a non-profit charitable organization dedicated to helping injured and ill American Soldiers, Marines, Airmen, National Guard members, Coast Guard members and Sailors—and current active-duty personnel. The project, founded in 2006, is the work of UCLA graduate, Gina Elise who created a nonprofit organization which sells and distributes the Pin-Ups For Vets calendar, which hearkens back to 1940s and 1950-style vintage pin-girl images. The calendars are considered very tasteful by today's standards. The calendar feature female Veterans posing as WWII-style pin-ups. To date, the organization has donated over $127,000 to help expand physical rehabilitation programs at veterans hospitals. Pin-Ups For Vets Ambassadors have also personally visited with over 20,000 Veterans at VA Hospitals, Military Hospitals and State Veterans homes in 49 states across the Country to deliver gifts of appreciation over the past 19 years.

Vintage hardware often featured in Pin-ups For Vets photography, including old bikes, aircraft and military tanks. Elise, along with the Pin-Ups For Vets Ambassadors who are mostly female Veterans, travel to stateside military hospitals personally, delivering the calendars and other gifts to thank Veterans for their service.

Pin-Ups For Vets has received Congressional Recognition and has been honored by the State of California Senate, California Legislature Assembly and Los Angeles County Board of Supervisors. Gina Elise was awarded the Volunteer of the Year award by the Los Angeles Business Journal on May 5, 2009 (as part of the newspaper's "Women Making a Difference" award series). In November 2010, Gina was featured on an Oprah Winfrey Show episode honoring American volunteers. Also in 2010, the movie Red (Bruce Willis and Helen Mirren, Summit Entertainment) featured Gina Elise in a scene showing her pin-up in a locker in the CIA headquarters. Gina Elise also received the "Woman Of Philanthropy" award from the Lakers and Comerica Bank's Women's Business Awards in 2024. In October 2024, Gina Elise was named one We Are The Mighty's "Mighty 25", which is an award given to pioneers and change-makers in the Veteran Community. She received the "Beyond the Call" award from National VFW in 2022, and the "Community Bridge Builder" award from the National Association of Women Business Owners in 2013. Gina Elise was made an Honorary Colonel by American Legion in 2015. In 2007, Gina Elise was awarded the Outstanding Young Californian award from the Junior Chamber of Commerce and California Jaycees. Eleven flags have been flown in honor of the "Pin-Ups For Vets" calendar project on various military bases worldwide. It is the goal of Pin-Ups for Vets to boost morale for Veterans across America by visiting Veterans in every state.

== See also ==
- Pin-up girl
- List of charitable foundations
