= The Book Thing of Baltimore =

Charity based in Maryland, USA

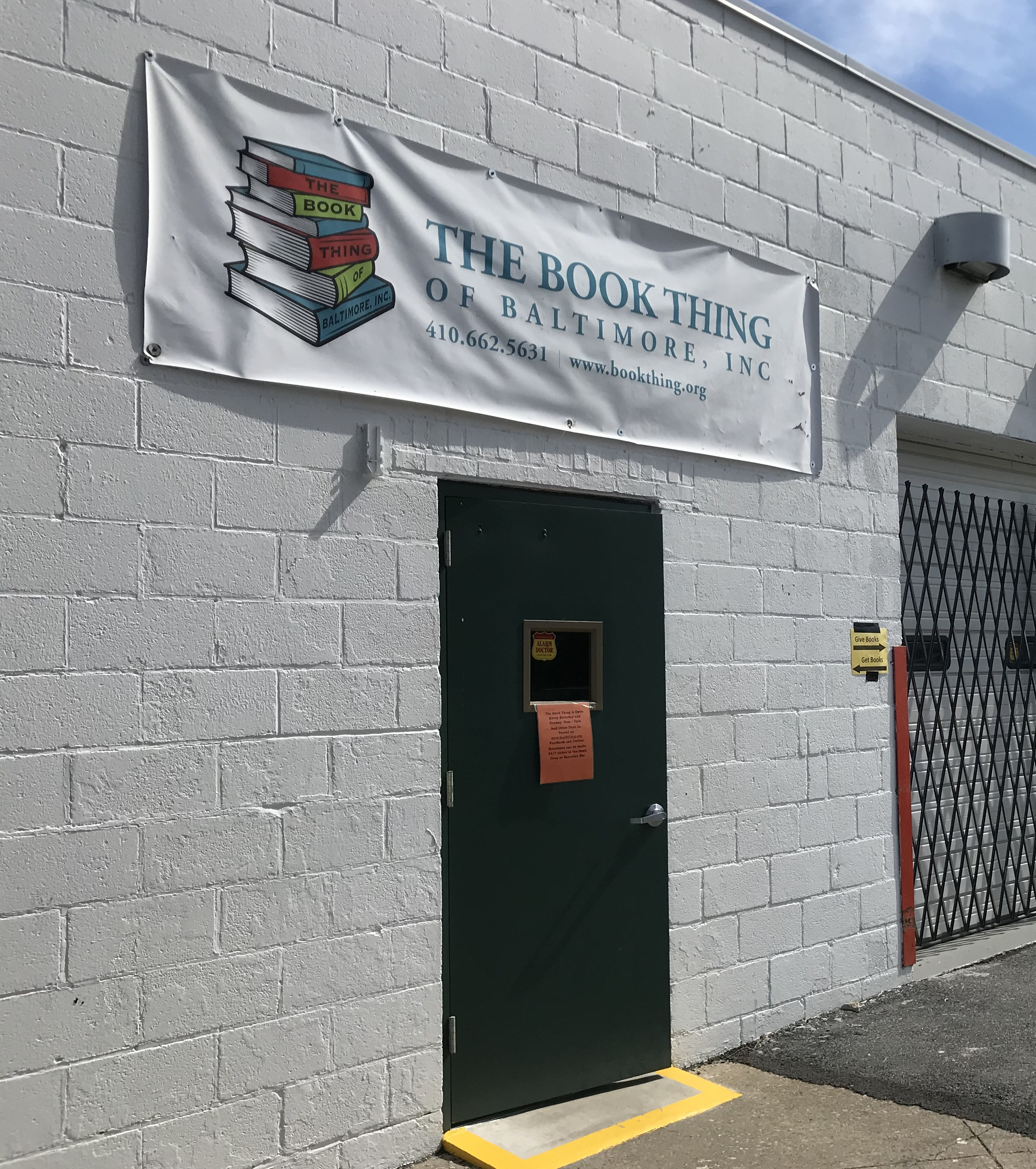
- Warehouse headquarters
- Established: 1999; 27 years ago
- Founder: Russel Wattenberg
- Type: Book exchange, 501(c)
- Location(s): 3001 Vineyard Lane; Baltimore, Maryland 21218
- Coordinates: 39°19′30.8″N 76°36′36.6″W
- Region served: Baltimore metropolitan area
- Volunteers: 30
- Website: bookthing.org

The Book Thing of Baltimore, or simply The Book Thing, is a 501(c) non-profit charity, located in Baltimore, Maryland. Created in September 1999, its purpose is to give unwanted books a new home and match books with interested readers. It was created and is operated by Russel Wattenberg, a former bartender who was inspired to create a system for distributing books to impoverished students. The estimated number of books at The Book Thing is 200,000, and they come from a variety of sources including people, businesses, and organizations. The Book Thing was incorporated by a board of neighborhood volunteers. The Book Thing is only open one day each month and is run by around 30 volunteers.

On March 2, 2016, a fire broke out in the early morning, which was extinguished by the Baltimore Fire Department. The fire, which was confined to one room of the warehouse, did not destroy all the contents, but ruined approximately one-third of the books stored there; other rooms suffered smoke and soot deposition only. The Book Thing ceased accepting new book donations, but continues to accept monetary donations via their website. Volunteers assisted with cleanup of books both for disposal and for distribution the following Saturday.

After a period of cash donations, fundraisers, and new books, the place was reopened in October 2017.
