= Kahna =

- Village
- Location in Punjab, India Kahna (India)
- Coordinates: 31.296820°N 75.256656°E
- Country: India
- State: Punjab
- District: Kapurthala

Government
  - Type: Panchayati raj (India)
  - Body: Gram panchayat

Population (2011)
  - Total: 710
- Sex ratio 339/371♂/♀

Languages
  - Official: Punjabi
  - Other spoken: Hindi
- Time zone: UTC+5:30 (IST)
- PIN: 144620
- Telephone code: 01822
- ISO 3166 code: IN-PB
- Vehicle registration: PB-09
- Website: kapurthala.gov.in

Kahna is a village in Kapurthala district of Punjab State, India. It is located 14 kilometres (8.7 mi) from Kapurthala, which is both district and sub-district headquarters of Kahna. The village is administrated by a Sarpanch who is an elected representative of village as per the constitution of India and Panchayati raj (India).

== Demography ==
According to the report published by Census India in 2011, Kahna has total number of 131 houses and population of 710 of which include 339 males and 371 females. Literacy rate of Kahna is 78.47%, higher than state average of 75.84%. The population of children under the age of 6 years is 69 which is 9.72% of total population of Kahna, and child sex ratio is approximately 1226, higher than state average of 846.

== Population data ==
Particulars	Total	Male	Female
Total No. of Houses	131	-	-
Total Population	710	339	371
In the age group 0–6 years	69	31	38
Scheduled Castes (SC)	45	17	28
Scheduled Tribes (ST)	0	0	0
Literates	503	253	250
Illiterate	207	86	121
Total Worker	33	22	11
Main Worker	22	16	6
Marginal Worker	11	6	5
