= Confetti Foundation =

The Confetti Foundation is a charity group launched in February 2014 by Stephanie Frazier Grimm that organizes birthday parties for sick children who are in the hospital on their birthday.

== History ==
Headquartered in Newport, RI, the Confetti Foundation was founded by Stephanie Frazier Grimm to try to enable families to "shift their focus from their child’s illness for a mere half an hour, during which time they would celebrate the child." For just half an hour over an oft-extended period of time dealing with doctors, medical tests and other invasive procedures, the child would be able to do something "normal" like other kids do, and celebrate their special day. One of the inspirations behind creating the foundation was Stephanie's own experience in being hospitalized during her 13th birthday.

== Mission ==
The Confetti Foundation aims to ensure all hospitalized kids will be able to celebrate their birthdays. To facilitate this, it supplies party starter kits. In 2014 the goal was to raise funds so that 500 boxes could be supplied and that the foundation has a presence in every state of America.

== Activities ==
The Foundation organizes celebratory parties in hospitals and sends volunteer "birthday fairies" to implement them.

The birthday box has everything needed for a birthday party. There are 50 different themes the celebrant's family can select. Each box contains: a banner, between four and eight settings of disposable plates, napkins, utensils, decorations, a handmade card and T-shirt for the celebrant. An extra "gift" can be added to the themed box, such as a princess book (princess theme) or a gym bag (sports theme).

== Fundraising ==
Each birthday party box costs around $22, and as of June 2014, enough money was raised to package and distribute 335 boxes to 64 hospitals.
