= Aythos =

Nonprofit organization

Aythos, Inc.
- Aythos Logo
- Founded: 2009
- Founder: Beau Miller; David Mabry
- Type: NGO
- Tax ID no.: 38-3807203
- Purpose: Sustainable development WASH
- Location(s): Washington, DC Little Rock, Arkansas
- Region served: Nepal
- Key people: Beau Miller, Board President; David Mabry, Executive Director
- Website: www.aythos.org
- Formerly called: Helambu Project USA, Inc. (2009–2012)

Aythos, Inc. (formerly known as Helambu Project USA, Inc.) is a U.S.-based economic development nonprofit working in Nepal fostering health and sustainable livelihood programs. Its goal is to provide economic development in environmentally sustainable ways, while reducing barriers to participating in markets.

== History ==
Aythos was founded in October 2009 after Beau Miller visited the village of Gangkharka in the Helambu region while a boarding school was being built. He came back to the United States and worked with David Mabry and others working in Nepal to start Helambu Project USA, Inc. Early efforts were focused on fundraising for the boarding school and managing a volunteer program for foreign teachers to work in villages in Helambu. In January 2012 the focus changed to economic development projects and the organization was rebranded as Aythos, Inc. Economic development programs provided training and subsidies to support fruit cash crops such as apples and kiwifruit, as well as spices and tea.

At 11:25 AM on April 25, 2015, Nepal was struck with a magnitude 7.8 earthquake followed by a magnitude 7.3 aftershock on May 12. The Aythos board temporarily suspended its economic development mission to engage in recovery efforts, including providing medical teams and delivering tarps, food, and building materials.

== Projects ==
In 2012 Aythos was asked to consult for a grant to develop apple tree and kiwifruit plant farms in villages in Helambu. The end result included 2,000 apple trees and 1,000 kiwifruit plants in the ground in the villages of Sermathang, Ghangyul, Tarkeyghang, and the Ani Gumba Nunnery.

In 2013 Aythos began beekeeping projects in several villages in both Sindhulpalchok District and Dolakha District of Nepal. The goal of the project is to train villagers on beekeeping and offer subsidized cost for beekeeping supplies.
