= Compassion Can't Wait =

US nonprofit organization

Compassion Can't Wait, formerly known as the Andre Sobel River of Life Foundation (ASRL), is a tax-exempt 501(c)(3) public charity in the United States that provides financial assistance to single caregivers of seriously ill children for urgent expenses ranging from essentials (such as food, transportation, utilities, and medications) to funds for rent and mortgage payments.

== Mission statement ==
"When compassion can't wait and single parent families are in despair, the Andre Sobel River of Life Foundation helps with urgent expenses to allow these caregivers to stay at their child's bedside during catastrophic illness."

== History ==
The Andre Sobel River of Life Foundation was founded by Valerie Sobel, a refugee from Hungary's Communist era, in January 2000 to honor the memory of her 19-year-old son Andre, who died of a brain tumor in 1995. Within the year following the loss of her son, Valerie lost her mother and, a year to the day after Andre's death, her husband Erwin took his own life. Valerie decided to begin helping single-parents of seriously ill children in grave need of financial assistance. Under her guidance, over $3.7 million in grants has been awarded to 2,600 families in the past eight years through partnerships with pediatric hospitals across the country.

== About the foundation and its programs ==
When no other resources are available, social workers at affiliated children's hospitals request funds on behalf of single-parent families in financial crisis. The foundation responds in 24 hours, and without additional paperwork, because the families' social workers have already verified their need.

The Andre Sobel River of Life Foundation also offers an annual Essay Award that honors the young survivors of a catastrophic illness.

== Affiliated partners ==
The Andre Sobel River of Life Foundation works exclusively through a number of pediatric medical facilities, such as:

- Children's Hospital Boston (Boston, MA)
- Children's Hospital Los Angeles (Los Angeles, CA)
- Children's Hospital Medical Center of Akron (Akron, OH)
- Children's Hospital of Philadelphia (Philadelphia, PA)
- City of Hope National Medical Center (Duarte, CA)
- Institute for Families (Los Angeles, CA)
- Jonathan Jacques Children's Cancer Center (Long Beach, CA)
- Lucile Packard Children's Hospital at Stanford (Palo Alto, CA)
- Mattel Children's Hospital UCLA (Los Angeles, CA)
- Morgan Stanley Children's Hospital (New York, NY)
- Texas Children's Hospital (Houston, TX)
- The Children's Inn at the National Institutes of Health (Bethesda, MD)
- Ventura County Medical Center (Ventura, CA)

== In the news ==
The Andre Sobel River of Life Foundation received a $300,000 grant from the Genentech Foundation to provide support through their Everyday Needs Assistance program in April 2009. In summer 2008, the Andre Sobel River of Life Foundation received a $25,000 grant from the Million Dollar Roundtable Foundation in support of ASRL's mission. The Patricia Henley Foundation, located in Santa Barbara, California, pledged a four-year, $20,000 commitment to ASRL in support of children with severe respiratory conditions in December 2008.

In addition, Ms. Sobel was voted "Best Caregiver" in the Best of America 2008 issue of Reader's Digest. She also appeared in the April 2, 2007, edition of People magazine in an article entitled "A Mother's Bereaved Heart." Ms. Sobel was featured in the February 2007 edition of Lifestyles Magazine, and appeared on the Montel Williams Show in July 2007. Ms. Sobel has appeared numerous times in radio interviews, including Voice of America and The Lisa Birnbach Show.

Ms. Sobel has also been honored with both the Los Angeles Business Journal's Women Making A Difference: 2007 Philanthropist of the Year Award and the National Association of Women Business Owners' (NAWBO) Philanthropist of the Year.

In July 2009, Ms. Sobel was named a Purpose Prize Fellow, recognizing social innovation among leaders over the age of 60 in their second careers.
