= Serving Charity =

Organization

Serving charity
- Founded: 2003
- Founder: Abbas Jahangiri
- Type: Charity
- Region served: Canada, India, the Dominican Republic, Haiti, Germany, Iran, and Vietnam
- Website: http://www.servingcharity.com

Serving Charity is an international interfaith non-profit organization based in Toronto, Ontario, Canada. Its mission is to serve the poor through charity and selfless service. Mother Teresa of Calcutta is expressed to be the sole inspiration for the organization and all of its initiatives.

Serving Charity was founded in 2003 by Abbas Jahangiri. He is also the former owner of the historical music venue el Mocambo and other companies.

Serving Charity is entirely run by volunteers. It resides and is primarily supported by the revenue from the el Mocambo.

The organization has charity projects in seven countries; Canada, India, the Dominican Republic, Haiti, Germany, Iran, and Vietnam. In 2010 Serving Charity opened its first orphanage in Puerto Plata, Dominican Republic, for orphaned or abandoned Haitian refugee children. The organization is most recognized for its soup kitchen in Toronto where volunteers come to makes sandwiches and go out to feed the homeless every night from 2:00AM–6:00AM.

Children4Charity (C4C) and Kids with Special Needs (KSN) are branches of Serving Charity that focus on developing the act of giving in children. Serving Charity supports three Children4Charity schools in the Dominican Republic for Haitian refugee children.
