= Epilepsy Outlook =

UK charity

- Formation: July 1, 1987
- Founder: Jill Kitchen
- Type: Charitable organization and Support group
- Registration no.: 701140
- Location: 79 Park Road, The Arches, Hartlepool, UK, TS24 7PW
- Region served: Hartlepool, Redcar, Cleveland
- Services: Advice Centre; Supporting volunteer placements Epilepsy awareness training Drop-in centre Charity shops Art group
- Key people: Jacqui Gettings (Operations Manager)
- Affiliations: The Joint Epilepsy Council
- Revenue: (2012–13) £64,073 Charity Shops £1,067 Nation Epilepsy Week £24,846 Legacy
- Disbursements: (2012–13) £5,000 Catcote College sensory room £500 Springwell School; 2nd Tumble Form Chair for an individual Furniture/financial support to a client in need.
- Employees: 1
- Volunteers: 76 (2012–13)
- Website: www.epilepsyoutlook.org.uk
- Formerly called: Hartlepool Epilepsy Group

Epilepsy Outlook is a charity based in Hartlepool which provides free and confidential practical support, advice and information for people with epilepsy and their carers. Their support services include supported volunteer placements, a drop-in centre, epilepsy awareness training, an art therapy group and welfare benefits advice. Each year it provides placements for 50 volunteers on the volunteer development programme, 280 people receive advice, including at least 100 carers. 50 plus people receive epilepsy awareness training. Six people use their drop-in each week. The services are provided for people across the North-East area. In September–October 2014, Epilepsy Outlook's headquarters, advice centre and art club moved around the corner to larger premises in The Arches, Park Road.

== Campaigns ==
As well as their charity shops and advice centre they run special fund raising campaigns including, most recently, for a sensory room for Callum Smith. By September 5, 2013, the total stood at £10,184 and raised a total of £14,000. Three McDonald's restaurants got involved with the campaign, raising £2,289, and Hartlepool's High Tunstall College of Science donated over £5,000 worth of sensory equipment including multi-coloured fibre optic lights, bubble machines and specialist chairs.

Before that they ran a campaign for a tumble form chair for two-year-old Talia Foster.

== Structure ==
The charity is structured into volunteers, a management committee and trustees.

- The management committee includes a Chairperson, Secretary, Treasurer and Operations manager.
- The trustees include a medical trustee, business advice trustees, voluntary sector advice trustees and a legal trustee.
