= Solihten Institute =

Non-profit organization

Solihten Institute (formerly known as The Samaritan Institute) is a non-profit organization based in Denver, Colorado which manages a national network of counseling centers (Affiliated Centers) that prioritize accessible mental health care and integrated approaches to care that acknowledge the interdependence of mind, body, spirit, and community into a person's well-being.

Solihten Centers are independently run affiliates accredited by Solihten Institute. The model is cost-effective in practice and is capable of offering counseling at lower rates than many other programs. In addition, Solihten Centers work in collaboration with local physicians and faith-related organizations to best serve a client's varying needs, as appropriate. Solihten Institute is a 501(c)(3) organization, governed by a board of directors.

== Ethics in Business Awards ==
Many Solihten Centers host local Ethics in Business Awards programs. The Awards are intended to honor community leaders, businesses, and non-profit organizations which promote social responsibility, civic improvement, environmental concerns or ethical conduct.
