= Inheritance of Hope =

US nonprofit organization

- Founded: 2007
- Founder: Deric and Kristen Milligan
- Location: Atlanta, Georgia
- Origins: Cornwall-on-Hudson, New York
- Region served: United States
- CEO: Aaron Hedges
- Key people: Board of Directors; Deric Milligan, Co-Founder & Chairman; Richard Birney; Kim Bohannon; Dr. O.P. Cooper; Eric Dewey; Dr. Dan Dix; Jackie Kuwitzky, Board Fellow; Mark Shaw
- Website: inheritanceofhope.org

Inheritance of Hope is a nonprofit charity that inspires hope in young families facing the loss of a parent. Through resources and relationships, Inheritance of Hope is a community that helps families navigate the challenges of a parent's terminal illness. Inheritance of Hope was founded by Kristen and Deric Milligan and rose from their efforts to deal with raising three young children during Kristen's battle with liver cancer.

== Story ==
The Inheritance of Hope story began with one young family facing a parent's terminal illness – a mom and dad with young children looking for resources for their entire family as they all navigated the mom's illness. Surprisingly, there were none. They decided to create resources for their family and share them with others.

In 2007, Deric and Kristen Milligan launched Inheritance of Hope with the mission to inspire in young families facing the loss of a parent, and the brand has grown to serve families throughout the U.S.

== Background ==
Inheritance of Hope was founded by Deric and Kristen Milligan following several years of coping with the challenges of raising three young children while battling a terminal illness. The concept was born in 2003 after Kristen, then 30, was diagnosed with a rare terminal liver cancer and had difficulty finding literature to help her three young children (ages 4, 2, and 7 months) through this challenging time. She decided to remedy the problem and wrote her first book, A Train's Rust, A Toy Maker's Love, to help her children better understand what was happening in their family.

Six surgeries, two radiation treatments, two rounds of chemotherapy, and three books later, Kristen and her husband Deric expanded the concept by co-founding Inheritance of Hope, a 501(c)(3) nonprofit charity devoted to inspiring hope in young families facing the loss of a parent. Sadly Kristen lost her courageous bout with cancer in 2012, but her legacy remains as the organization serves families like her own.

Too many young families suffering from a parent’s terminal illness feel hopelessly alone, like no one cares. Inheritance of Hope mobilizes people who care and are brave enough to practice “jorrow”™ - joy and sorrow at the same time.

== Programs ==
Inheritance of Hope builds community for families affected by terminal illness:

- Hope@Home™, meet online, weekly, with others who care and get it. Options for all ages, whether living with illness or life after loss
- Legacy Retreats®, destination experience where families create lifelong memories and receive the tools to navigate the challenges of terminal illness
- Hope Hubs™, local monthly gatherings with loving volunteers and other families who get it (both living with illness and life after loss)
- Legacy Video™, priceless opportunity to share what matters most with your loved ones - with a Legacy Video coach handling all the logistics online, you create a lasting treasure for your loved ones (securely backed up)
- Legacy Song™, capture what matters most in a personalized song you’ll treasure for a lifetime
- Inheritance of Hope Podcast, deeply personal conversations exploring what it means to create a legacy, both in death and in life.

All services are free, thanks to generous donors. Inheritance of Hope welcomes families of all faiths and backgrounds while serving under the core beliefs of the Christian faith.

== Awards ==
Inheritance of Hope has been recognized as a "Top 10 Children's Charity" by Theravive, a network of licensed therapists and psychologists.

Inheritance of Hope has earned Charity Navigator's highest rating.

Inheritance of Hope is an accredited charity by the Better Business Bureau

Since 2011, Inheritance of Hope has earned a "Top-Rated" rating from GreatNonProfits.org.

Former Co-founder & CEO Deric Milligan was recognized by "the one hundred," an organization by the Mass General Cancer Center that recognizes 100 everyday amazing groups and individuals who are changing how we fight cancer.

Co-founder Kristen Milligan, posthumously received the John W. Kuykendall Award for Community Service. The award recognizes Davidson College alumni who have provided extraordinary service to their community, demonstrating leadership through servanthood.

The National Ethnic Coalition of Organizations (NECO) presented the 29th annual Ellis Island Medals of Honor ceremony on Ellis Island in New York City. Inheritance of Hope Co-founder and CEO, Deric Milligan, was honored as a 2015 recipient for his dedication serving families facing the loss of a parent. Other notable guests included Jay Baker (President, Kohl's), Edward Creagan (Mayo Clinic), Richard Gelfond (CEO, IMAX), Howard Lutnick (CEO, Cantor Fitzgerald), Sandra Day O'Connor (Supreme Court Justice), Mariano Rivera (New York Yankees), Frank Shankwitz (Founder, Make-a-Wish), and Meredith Vieira (TV personality).

Co-founder Kristen Milligan was posthumously inducted into the Harrison School for the Arts Hall of Fame for her demonstrated leadership, creativity, and innovation in many ways, most notably in her approach to a terminal diagnosis.
