= Global Greengrants Fund =

U.S. charitable foundation

Global Greengrants Fund is a charitable foundation that makes small grants (typically $500 to $5,000) to grassroots environmental causes around the world. These funds are used to support community-based groups outside the United States and Western Europe working on issues of environmental justice, sustainability, and conservation. Since its establishment in 1993, Global Greengrants Fund has made over 14,000 grants in 168 countries, giving a total of over $100 million.

== Focus areas ==
Global Greengrants work is captured by six action areas: 1) climate justice, 2) local livelihoods, 3) healthy ecosystems and communities, 4) women's environmental action, 5) right to land, water, and resources, and 6) right to defend the environment.

== Recognition ==
To date, 65 Greengrants grantees and advisors have been awarded the Goldman Environmental Prize, considered the "Nobel Prize of environmental activism".

== See also ==
- Conservation movement
- Environmental protection
- Natural capital
