= National Collegiate Cancer Foundation =

American nonprofit organization

The National Collegiate Cancer Foundation (NCCF) provides services and support to young adults aged 18–35 who have been diagnosed with cancer. The organization's goal is to provide resources to encourage students to continue with higher education throughout their treatment and, provides need-based financial support to these students and their families. In addition, the NCCF promotes awareness and prevention of cancer.

== History ==
In 2005, at the age of 22, while at Wagner College in Staten Island, Dan Waeger was diagnosed with cancer, initially thought to be Cancer of Unknown Primary. After nearly a year of treatment, the diagnosed as non-small cell lung carcinoma (adenocarcinoma) despite never having been a smoker. After nearly four years of treatment, Waeger died on March 16, 2009.

Waeger founded the National Collegiate Cancer Foundation in October 2005, accompanied by a web site in January 2006.

== Activities ==
Each year, the Foundation awards $1,000 scholarships to young adult cancer survivors who display a winning attitude in their fight against cancer. Scholarships are also awarded to young adults who have lost a parent or guardian to cancer. Between 2006 and 2022, the NCCF has awarded over 675 scholarships.

The Foundation's primary fundraising activity is the Waeger C.U.P., and annual golf tournament held at the Royal Oaks Golf Club in Lebanon, Pennsylvania. The C.U.P's name is a nod to Dan's initial diagnosis of Cancer of the Unknown Primary (CUP). In their first year, the tournament raised $12,000.

NCCF is a founding member of the Lance Armstrong Foundation's LIVESTRONG Young Adult Alliance, a consortium of scientists, government agencies, clinicians, non-profit organizations, and public health officials whose goal is to raise awareness and effect positive change for young adults with cancer.

== Quotes ==
To those of us on the team fighting cancer, it may seem that some days, the challenge is too big, too tough. We hear about another friend, parent, or co-worker being diagnosed. We hear about those that make it, but a lot of times. ... we unfortunately hear about those who don't. In difficult times, we must remember that life's challenges are not supposed to paralyze us and bring us down, but help us discover who we are and the changes we can become. So don't just be good at something, challenge yourself to be great.

–Dan Waeger
