= Ripples Foundation =

US-based non-governmental organization

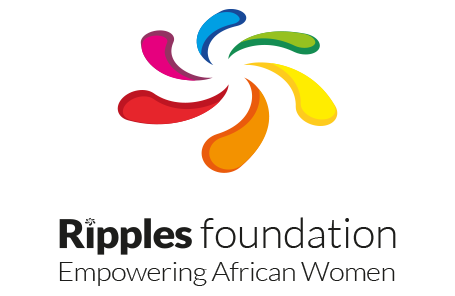
- Formation: 2005
- Founder: Anne Phillips
- Type: Non-governmental organization
- Legal status: Charity
- Headquarters: St. Louis, Missouri, USA
- Website: ripplesfoundation.org
- Formerly called: BME Concern, Ripples in Africa

Ripples Foundation (also known as Ripples In Africa) is a US based non-governmental organization that works primarily with women in the countries of Nigeria, Madagascar, and Ghana to alleviate extreme poverty in Africa. The organization often partners with other organizations to meet its goals of "supporting women in distress, promoting inclusion and community cohesion, and working to raise levels of tolerance through education, art, sports, and culture."

== History ==
Ripples Foundation was founded in the UK in 2005 by Anne Phillips under the name BME Concern.

BME Concern partnered with Ripples in Africa in 2011 to deliver women's empowerment projects in West Africa, and, after four years of working together, BME Concern and Ripples In Africa merged and changed its name to Ripples Foundation in 2014.

In 2015, Ripples Foundation was granted 501(c)(3) status by the Internal Revenue Service in the United States (under EIN No. 47-3722946).

== Activities ==
=== Empowering Women ===
Ripples Foundation's Village Women's Enterprise Programme provides resources for village women groups to start and manage their own enterprises, so they can provide food and generate income to sustain their families.

Through its past collaboration with Promasidor, Ripples in Africa won a 2013 SERA award for its "commitment to supporting and collaborating for the empowerment of women." Andrew Enaharo, Head of Legal and Public Relations at Promasidor, said of their partnership with Ripples Foundation: “Our unique partnership with BME Concern (known as Ripples in Africa) reinforces our commitment to creating measurable and quality impact in our communities through our support and collaboration on youth projects, empowering minority/village women, community cohesion, supporting development, village enterprises, education, cottage health services, child poverty, and hunger.”

In September 2015, the CEO Anne Toba attended the Ministry of Women Affairs and Social Development's forum to address the issues that women living in Kano State, Nigeria experience, and to discuss the options for empowerment programs to be delivered in the region.

Today the organisation continues its work in Africa by creating alliances with different partners. Their current projects include training in embroidery, media, animal rearing and farming projects. By delivering training and business financing the organization tries to reach its goal to improve economic outcomes for whole households.

=== Youth Development ===
Ripples Foundation has run several youth projects in Gravesend with local schools to encourage community cohesion through cultural awareness. Ripples has furthermore, in partnership with Promasidor, provided materials needed for playing sports to Cowbell Football Academy in Nigeria. The items, which include leather balls, jerseys, boots, keeper gloves, water bottles, and sports pumps, were presented to the Academy at the Main Bowl of the National Stadium SurulereLinagos on Saturday, February 21, 2015. Twenty-four secondary schools of over 500 students benefited from the donation, supporting children who were interested in the game but could not afford equipment, and keeping them off the streets by engaging them in a meaningful sporting activity with the potential to develop their character. The organization has also provided materials for education and health care for children in communities in Nigeria.

Ripples Foundation currently runs training Programmes for young people in Africa to improve their media skills and their embroidery skills to become more employable.

=== Community Development ===
Ripples Foundation's programs tackle issues that are faced by African women and their children every day, such as hunger and lack of medical care, and work to improve their living conditions and alleviate poverty in their community. Ripples Foundation also runs a yearly event in the sponsored villages to provide medical equipment and medicines for the community.

=== Akomi brand ===
In 2015, Ripples Foundation established Ripples Trading and the Akomi brand in order to protect African village women's businesses and make sure that the products, made thanks to the Women's Enterprise Programme, can get a fair price within the global market. Indeed, all Akomi products are grown and processed by women living in small African villages. Proceeds from the sales of Akomi products are given directly to the women who produce them and will be invested back into their enterprises, or used to provide their children and communities with essential medical care and food. Women are producing and selling natural products such as shea butter, moringa oil, dry fish, cocoa butter or black soap.

In May 2016, Ripples Foundation started to launch the Akomi products on the United Kingdom market.
