= Athena Fund =

Israeli non-profit organization

- Founded: 2006
- Founder: Uri Ben-Ari (basketballer)
- Purpose: Empowering teachers in Israel by providing them with tools for self-fulfillment and professional advancement.
- Location: Tel Aviv, Israel
- Region served: Israel
- Method: Donation of laptop and tablet computers to teachers
- Key people: Daphna Tamir
- Website: www.athenafund.org

Athena Fund is a non-profit organization that was established in 2006. Its mission is to empower teachers in Israel by providing them with tools for self-fulfillment and professional advancement. The fund was established by business executives under the guidance of Uri Ben-Ari, who is the CEO of UBA Ventures and formerly held the position of Executive Vice President at Ness Technologies.

Introduced in 2007, Athena Fund's flagship initiative is the "Digital Toolbox for Every Teacher in Israel" (formerly "Laptop Computer for Every Teacher in Israel") program. Launched with the support of Israel's Prime Minister's Office, the program has been implemented in collaboration with the Israeli Ministry of Education, the Israel Teachers Union, and Bank Massad, an Israeli bank that specializes in providing banking services to teachers.

Since 2012, Athena Fund has launched three additional programs in Israel: "Digital Toolbox for Every Kindergarten Teacher" (“Laptop Computer for Every Kindergarten Teacher,” 2012); "Digital Toolbox for Every STEM Teacher" (“Tablet for Every Science Teacher,” 2014); and "Digital Toolbox for Every Special Education Teacher" (“iPad for Every Special Education Teacher,” 2015).

== Laptop computers for every teacher in Israel ==
The mission of the Laptop Computer for Every Teacher in Israel program (launched in 2007) is to empower teachers, enhance their access to the digital world, and raise their social status. The goal of the program is to provide a laptop computer and 120 hours of professional training to each and every elementary, middle, and high school teacher in Israel by the end of 2018.

Each participating teacher receives a laptop computer with a protective case, a full set of Microsoft software, a 3-year warranty, 24/7 support, and a 120-hour professional training course.

== Laptop for every kindergarten teacher ==
The Laptop for Every Kindergarten Teacher program (launched in 2012) aims to enhance teachers' status and increase accessibility to the digital environment.

The program trains teachers to use computers for different purposes and helps bring innovative teaching methods to kindergarten classrooms. Kindergarten computer use helps develop independent learning and promotes children's emotional, social, and cognitive development.

Each participating teacher receives a laptop computer with a protective case, a full set of Microsoft software, a 3-year warranty, 24/7 support, and a 120-hour professional training course.

== Tablet for every science teacher ==
The Tablet for Every Science Teacher program (launched in 2014) aims to empower science and technology teachers and help them make each class more enjoyable and productive by using innovative technological means for teaching.

Each participating teacher receives a GlobiMate tablet from Globisens. This tablet comes with multiple built-in sensors and a microscope. In addition, the teacher receives a 1-year warranty, 24/7 support, and a 120-hour professional training course.

== iPad for every special-education teacher in Israel ==
The iPad for Every Special-Education Teacher in Israel program (launched in 2015) aims to enable special-education students to engage in meaningful learning, strengthening the students’ enjoyment and motivation, and improving interpersonal communication. Each participating teacher receives an iPad tablet, a 3-year warranty, 24/7 support, and a 120-hour professional training course. Parents to teens with special needs say that the iPad enables the children, even those who had never before communicated with their parents and their environment, to interact with their surroundings in a most exciting manner.

== Program participants ==
As of December 31, 2015, the Laptop Computer for Every Teacher in Israel program has provided laptops and professional training to over 12,000 teachers in 503 cities and small communities in 1,104 schools and kindergartens. The Laptop for Every Kindergarten Teacher program (launched in 2012) has provided laptops and professional training to 486 kindergarten teachers in Israel. The Einstein Tablet+ for Every Science Teacher program (launched in 2014) has provided tablets and professional training to 856 science and technology teachers in Israel. The iPad for Every Special-Education Teacher program (launched in 2015) has provided tablet computers and professional training to 247 special-education teachers in Israel.

== Sponsorship ==
The Laptop Computer for Every Teacher in Israel program, Athena Fund’s first program, was launched in 2007 with the sponsorship of the Prime Minister's Office. Today, Athena Fund’s programs are implemented with the cooperation of the Israeli Ministry of Education, the Fund for Professional Advancement of the Israel Teachers Union, and Bank Massad, which specializes in providing banking services to teachers.

== Program advisory board ==
The program is supported by an advisory board of Israeli business, political, and academic leaders, including:

- Eliezer Shkedi, former CEO of El Al Israel Airlines Former Commander in Chief, Israeli Air Force
- Moshe Lichtman, former President of Microsoft Israel R&D Center and Microsoft Corporate VP
- Udi Shani, Former General Manager of Israel’s Ministry of Defense, Former Major General, IDF
- Raviv Zoller, CEO of IDI-Direct Insurance
- Peli Peled, Editor-in-Chief and Joint-CEO of People and Computers
- Prof. Nava Ben-Zvi, President of Hadassah Academic College and the Bloomfield Science Museum Jerusalem
- Amram Mitzna, Former Major General, IDF
- Prof. Moshe Bar Niv (Burnovski), Former Provost and Senior Vice President for Academic Affairs and Development, Interdisciplinary Center (IDC) Herzliya

== Program results ==
The results of a survey conducted among 300 participating teachers in the Negev (southern Israel) in June 2008 indicated a substantial improvement in teacher and student performance. 75% of the teachers reported that as a result of using a laptop computer, their teaching effectiveness improved and student interest increased. Moreover, 35% of the teachers noted a significant decrease in classroom disciplinary problems.

In another survey conducted in 2011 (in various schools), 99% of the participants reported an improvement in their status in the classroom. Moreover, classroom disruptions decreased by 35%.

In a survey conducted in 2014 (in youth villages), 61% of teachers said that the laptop greatly helped improve teaching processes, and 62% said that it greatly helped update the teacher’s knowledge in work-related areas. 47% said that using the laptop in the classroom greatly contributed to more efficient use of classroom teaching time, and participation in the program greatly helped implement new teaching methods in the classroom. 48% stated that students' interest in the lesson topics greatly increased as a result of laptop use.
