= Children's Development Trust =

UK charity

The Children's Development Trust is a charity established in the UK in 2008, aimed at helping children and young people develop their individual or group skills in education, sport, the arts, health and wellbeing. The charity organised and promoted the music festivals 'Music On The Hill' held at Kings Hill, West Malling in 2011 and 2013 and featuring artists such as Katherine Jenkins, Jools Holland, McFly, Sugababes, Peter Andre and many others, with 100% of the profits donated to Demelza Hospice Care for Children and Teens Unite Fighting Cancer, the charity established by designer Karen Millen OBE who also worked on the project. The charity is based in Maidstone, Kent.
