= REHASWISS =

- Founded: 1977
- Headquarters: Bern (Switzerland)
- President: Johannes Leutwyler
- Director: Joseph Aerthott
- Website: www.rehaswiss.ch

The organisation REHASWISS was founded in 1977 by Joseph Aerthott, a naturalised Swiss of Indian origin, along with few Swiss friends. The idea and goal behind the organisation is to help the disabled people in the third world, particularly on the Indian subcontinent. It is certified by ZEWO as a charity organisation and is authorized to use the ZEWO seal.

It is a politically and religiously neutral organisation. With the help of donations, membership contributions and patrons as well as contributions from the Swiss government, municipalities, churches and other institutions, it assists around 700 to 1000 disabled people every year in finding a self-supporting job and a livelihood. At present it is working in cooperation with around 25 NGOs in India and Bangladesh.
