= Community Network Projects =

Community Network
- Company type: Charity
- Founded: 1990
- Headquarters: United Kingdom
- Website: communitynetworkprojects.org

Community Network is a registered charity in the United Kingdom, formed initially in Northern Ireland in August 1990 as a six-month project to bring people together across the sectarian divide using telecommunications. It went on to become a UK-wide charity using telecommunications for social benefit.

The charity's main focus is addressing loneliness for older people, and its chief executive, Angela Harris, has spoken out about this increasing issue in society. Community Network is also included as a resource to support loneliness in older people on the National_Health_Service website NHS Choices.

Community Network has been working since October 2013 with The Silver Line, a help line for older people established by Esther Rantzen CBE, by providing group calls called "Silver Circles".

A number of other long-term projects in farming, fishing and regional communities are also supported by the charity.

Community Network operated its own teleconferencing service for 23 years until July 2013 when this operation was deemed non-core to the charity objectives and was transferred to The Phone Co-op.

The charity's day-to-day running costs continue to be partly funded by the income from this teleconferencing service which is also provided for other charities and not-for-profit organisations e.g. Mencap

== Projects ==
=== Seafarers Link ===
Community Network have provided a telephone conference service 'Seafarers Link' since 2009 through Community Network that supports retired seafarers.

=== London ===
Through City Bridge Trust funding, the Community Network have supported phone groups for the elderly in London since 2012.

=== Bedford ===
Bedford Borough Council funded a Community Network project starting in June 2012.

== Social enterprise ==
The charity is a social enterprise focussed on establishing telephone communities as a way to socialise that is accessible to some of the people most affected by loneliness – older people, carers and disabled people with mobility problems.

In 2009, Community Network was awarded the Social Enterprise Mark.

== Approach ==
Community Network operates Telephone Community groups; most 'meet' once a week for an hour, at an agreed time. Each group has a facilitator – a trained volunteer, who starts the discussion and supports group members to take part.

Before each session, experienced operators call each of the group members, including the facilitator, to find out if they want to take part. They are then connected to the discussion. People taking part can put the phone down at any point.

Some groups are for general socialising – people chat or choose a topic to discuss each week. Other groups offer health and other information. Some groups bring people together because they have something in common.

== Leadership ==
The Community Network Chief Executive is Angela Cairns from Jan 2013.

The Chair of Trustees is Stephen Heard from Dec 2012.
