= GEFEK =

Non profit medical exchange group

- Founded: 2004 by Ewald Beck
- Type: Non-profit
- Location: Giessen, Germany
- Services: Education
- Fields: Transfer of medical knowledge and technology
- Website: www.gefek.de

GEFEK, the Association for the Promotion of Independent Disease Control in Developing Countries ("Gesellschaft zur Förderung Eigenständiger Krankheitsbekämpfung in Entwicklungsländern"), was created by scientists of the University of Giessen, Germany, in 2004 and is officially registered as a non-profit organisation. The association aims at promoting the exchange of medical knowledge and biomedical technology between industry nations and countries with a low health standard, such as Mongolia, Panama, Bolivia and Yemen.

Infectious diseases are worldwide a major cause of death, especially in developing countries. Next to inexpensive drugs, there is an urgent need for affordable diagnostic methods. Recent progress in biomedical research led to new techniques highly appropriate for the diagnosis of infectious diseases. These new methods are advantageous not only because they lead to results in short time, but also because they are affordable and applicable under conditions of poverty. Major objective of GEFEK is the transfer of this knowledge to scientists in low-income countries and to establish new technology in a way that can be performed without help from abroad. The transfer includes information on the theoretical background, the performance of molecular diagnostic methods and the knowledge for the production of the necessary test substances. The self-contained operation of this technology by the affected population is the best guarantee for their sustainable application.

In contrast to other organisations, which provide help directly in crisis regions, the contribution of GEFEK consists in the transfer of basic medical knowledge and technology, in order to help the people in poor countries according to the principle "help to self-help". A lot of health problems are not due in the first instance to a lack of medicines, but rather to the lack of appropriate methods for the diagnosis of the affecting diseases. Frequently, there are no adequate diagnostic methods available which could be used, or the available methods are unaffordable, this means, considerably more expensive than the needed drugs. GEFEK not only teaches physicians and technical personnel but also the new scientific generation, i.e. students in medicine and other health-related disciplines.

== Mongolia ==
Members of GEFEK are cooperating with doctors from the Health Science University of Mongolia in the capital Ulaanbaatar. The objective of the common efforts is a countrywide evaluation of the distribution of most important infectious diseases, to enable specific control measures against these major causes of morbidity in the population. Within this cooperation and thanks to private donations, a laboratory in Ulaanbaatar was completely equipped with apparatuses needed for adequate performance of molecular diagnosis. Members of GEFEK were there repeatedly (2004 and 2005) to install the technology and to train Mongolian scientists. In this laboratory it is meanwhile possible to diagnose all important sexually transmitted diseases, tuberculosis, brucellosis, several respiratory pathogens and several diarrhoeal diseases. All these methods are specially designed to be used under limited technical and economical conditions. In the long term it is planned to enable Mongolian scientists to produce all substances needed for the continuation of the diagnosis themselves, such as recombinant diagnostic antigens, or Taq polymerase. In the future, this may make the country independent from help from abroad.

== Bolivia ==
The population of Bolivia suffers from a multiplicity of infectious diseases, such as Chagas disease. Because of its inapparent symptoms, the disease remains unrecognised most of the time and, untreated, leads after about 20 years to death, mainly due to heart pathologies. It is probably one of the major reasons for the extreme low average age of the population of 34 years only. Further prevalent existing diseases are malaria and, especially among young children, life-threatening diarrhoeal diseases, caused by entamoeba, bacteria or rotavirus. Tuberculosis, dengue fever and different forms of hepatitis are also wide spread. The diagnostic methods developed by GEFEK can be very useful for the fight against Chagas disease. A cooperation has been arranged with the national Chagas disease control initiative at the Universidad Mayor de San Simón, in Cochabamba.

== Panama ==
In July 2006, a one-week practical course was organised at the Universidad Autónoma de Chiriquí in David, Panama. About 20 students and 3 professors participated in the course. Although Panama belongs to the richest countries in Central America, the general medical care – except of Panama City - is not well developed. Many infectious diseases are common, which are neither correctly diagnosed nor treated.
