= Amici del Mondo World Friends Onlus =

Amici del Mondo World Friends ETS
- Founded: 2001
- Founder: Gianfranco Morino
- Purpose: Health, education, housing, cooperation
- Location(s): Viale Egeo 137, 00144 Rome, Italy; Theta Lane - P.O. BOX 39433-00623, Nairobi, Kenya
- Region served: Kenya, Tanzania, Ethiopia, Italia
- Key people: president Silvana Merico vice-president Mario Toti
- Website: www.world-friends.org

Amici del Mondo World Friends ETS is an independent Italian non-profit association of social utility for international cooperationWorld Friends is a Non-Governmental Organization recognized by the Italian Ministry of Foreign Affairs by Law no. 125 of 2014 updated to July 16, 2016, registered in the register of ONLUS and the Register of Legal Persons D.P.R. 361. Recognized by the Government of Kenya as a Non-governmental organization (NGO), in 2011 obtained the same accreditation at the Italian Ministry of Foreign Affairs. Established in 2001, the association has its head offices in Rome and has volunteer-based regional offices in Piedmont, Liguria, Lombardy, Friuli-Venezia Giulia, Veneto, Emilia-Romagna, Lazio, Sicily. The association's African office is based in Nairobi.

== Aims and values ==
The aim of World Friends is to contribute to the achievement of the principles established in the Universal Declaration of Human Rights in all parts of the world, giving priority to fundamental rights for health, housing and education. World Friends’ actions at present are focused on the African continent and their final goal is to improve health, social and educational conditions in the most disadvantaged populations. Every action taken responds to actual needs and to a specific request from the local communities, and is undertaken with their full collaboration.

For this reason, the World Friends’ operative centre has taken the decision to live and work in the city of Nairobi in Kenya so as to assimilate better into the social structure of the area and be able to act as spokesman for the local communities.

== History ==
World Friends began from an initiative of Gianfranco Morino, a medical doctor with more than 35 years’ experience in Africa. After having collaborated for a number of years on projects with the Italian Cooperation for Development, in 1991 he took on responsibility with the Programme for Health Prevention and Education in the nomadic area of Sololo, North Kenya, collaborating with the UN High Commissioner for Refugees. Following work with the European Union in Somalia, in 1994 he began to work in health prevention and education in the shanty towns of Korogocho and Mathare in Nairobi. In 2002 he then took over the direction of the Department of Surgery at Mbagathi Hospital, still in the Kenyan capital, being the only European to work in a state-run hospital.

In 2001, together with a group of friends and collaborators, all convinced of the need for an association to be created in Africa itself, Morino established "World Friends - Amici del mondo". The central idea was that of an organization that could properly integrate with the reality of the local population, not being thousands of miles away, and able to carry out projects deriving from the concrete needs of these populations. To respond to that need, World Friends has over the years prioritized the use of local personnel, relying minimally on the services of expatriate personnel.

== Projects ==
The objective of all World Friends projects is to promote health, education and social development of the most disadvantaged populations in the south of the world. World Friends is active in Kenya, Tanzania and Ethiopia, meeting the needs of the local populations and with their full involvement. The ultimate goal remains to encourage self-sufficiency in the communities where the Association works, and it is for this reason that World Friends makes use above all of local personnel for its activities in Africa, contributing to their professional training.

An example of World Friends approach is the construction of the Ruaraka Uhai Neema Hospital, a multi-functioning health centre opened by World Friends in November 2008 Inauguration of R.U. Neema Hospital. Situated near to the shanty towns of Nairobi the hospital treats more than 10,000 patients per month, thanks to a staff composed of 99% local personnel. The Ruaraka Uhai Neema Hospital dedicated not only to the treatment of the poorest sector of the population but also to the training of local medical personnel. This action will go on further to consolidate the work carried out by World Friends at the Mbagathi Hospital and at the surgeries located in the Nairobi shanty towns. In addition to health assistance, World Friends workers carry out action in the field of health prevention and education, above all to combat the spread of the HIV virus. Services offered by the hospital: General clinic and Maternal-Infant Clinic with vaccination services, gynecology and pediatrics; Maternity Department with operating theatre; Diagnostics Centre offering laboratory tests, radiography and echography. Accident & Emergency, minor surgery and day hospital; HIV tests and treatments; Physiotherapy and Occupational Therapy; Pharmacy; Ambulance service; Centre for Professional Training; Pediatrics Department.

Since its inception in 2001, the association has focused its plan of action on achieving the eight Millennium Development Goals, approved by the 193 member States of the United Nations for world development, to be achieved within 2015. Today, the new challenge are the Sustainable Development Goals to which all countries are called upon to contribute to bringing the world to a global, economic and social sustainability path without distinction Between South and North. Our new goal is therefore the 2030: World Friends will not only continue to work against poverty in the South of the planet, expanding its collaboration with other communities in Africa and Latin America, but will also bring programs and experience in the suburbs of the North of the World, where injustice, inequality and the lack of rights are increasingly accentuated.

== Context ==
World Friends works mainly in the sub-saharian countries of Africa, such as Kenya, Tanzania and Ethiopia. The projects of World Friends are mainly focused on populations in the shantytowns in the north - east area of Nairobi (Korogocho, Kariobangi, Babadogo, Mathare Valley - Eastleigh, Huruma, Kahawa, Soweto).around 700,000 people, half of whom are under 15 years of age.

The beneficiaries of World Friends’ projects come from backgrounds marked by poverty, violence, criminality, prostitution, the precariousness of housing and work, pollution, diseases. The health problems found by the health workers of World Friends are innumerable: gastroenteritis and severe respiratory diseases, especially in children; a permanent status of malnutrition and the presence of typhoid fever and malaria. Tuberculosis is in evident recrudescence; the number of children with physical handicaps is high. The diagnosis of ailments requiring surgery and the incidence of cancer – the latter showing a clear increase – is often delayed due to the intrinsic inefficiencies of the health systems in African countries. The lack of specialist services for diagnosis and treatment accessible to the poor worsens the outcomes of traumas and burns, very frequent among children, often causing permanent disabilities in a context where physical integrity is linked to the survival of the individual. The transmission of sexual diseases is very widespread, AIDS in particular being a very real scourge.

Regarding trends for the rest of the city and for the country, access to reproductive health services in the Nairobi slums is minimal: only 15% of the health structures present provide basic obstetrical assistance and only 35% of the births are assisted by qualified personnel. Maternal mortality in the shanty towns (590 mothers per 100,000 births in 1998) is higher than in any other region in Kenya. The infant mortality rate under 5 years of age (1,565 deaths for every 1000 babies, equal to 15.6%) is higher than that of any other urban settlement in Kenya. Lastly, because the incidence off AIDS is decreasing at the National level, in the Nairobi slums adolescents and women are still strongly vulnerable, with 37% of women between 20 and 24 years of age resulting positive to the infection.

== Networks ==
World Friends works in collaboration with many other bodies in Italian and international cooperation: CONCORD Italia Platform, Italian Observatory for Global Action against AIDS, Global Health Center of the Tuscany Region, Since 2016 World Friends is a member of LINK 2007, one of the three main networks representing NGOs nationwide. World Friends is part of regional networks that unite profit and non-profit realities, public bodies, universities and experts, thanks to the activities of local offices and volunteers. These realities work to systemize and strengthen local activities of international cooperation, the development of territorial cooperation and awareness raising in Italy. The most active are the Tuscan Forum for International Activities, the Coordination of Piedmont NGOs, the Janua Forum, the Ligurian Network for the Promotion of International Activities. Nairobi's headquarters and association projects are constantly a place to visit by delegations from various organizations and by volunteers, interns and practitioners. World Friends is a member of several networks including: Hennet - Health NGOs Network, a NGO consortium and Kenyan and international institutions operating in Kenya in the field of healthcare; Action for Children with Disabilities (ACD), Nairobi Child Protection Network (NCPT), Elimu Yetu, Kasarani Genver-Based Violence Forum.

== Partners ==
In addition to the realities involved in the projects at local level in Italy and in Africa, World Friends’ main partners are the following:

- Africa Rafiki
- Caritas Antoniana
- Comitato Internazionale per lo Sviluppo dei Popoli
- Fondazione Ivo de Carneri
- APHRC
- European Commission
- Conferenza Episcopale Italiana
- Rome Municipality
- Regione Toscana and ASL 7
- Medici per la Pace di Verona
- Oxfam Italia
- Fondazione Engera
- Department for Youth Policies and Sporting Activities
- Cuore Amico Foundation (Brescia)
- International Medical Equipment Collaborative (IMEC) - (United States)
- Trentino|Autonomous Province of Trento
- Piedmonte Region
- Università Campus Bio-Medico
- Università Bocconi
- Università Cattolica di Milano
- University College of Utrecht
- Università degli Studi di Siena
- LUMSA
- Roman Catholic Archdiocese of Nairobi|Archdiocese of Nairobi
- Kajiado County Hospital
- Ngong Sub-County Hospital
- Urafiki Centre Foundation
- Zam Zam Medical Services
- Kenya Ministry of Health
- Nairobi and Kajiado Regional Health Departments
- Ministry of Education of Kenya
- Municipal Department of Education (Nairobi)
- Children's Department
- Ministry of Children, equal opportunities and social development of Kenya
- ACREF (African Cultural Research and Education Foundation)
- Kariobangi Parish
- African Population and Health Research Centre (APHRC)
- KEMRI (Kenya Medical Research Institute)
- Slum Film Festival CBO
- The Action Foundation
- AAR Beckmann Trust
- Wings of Compassion
- WRAP
- Special Education Professionals (SEP)
- German Doctors Nairobi
- Redeemed Gospel Church Health Centre
- Mwangaza Ulio na Tumaini Health Centre
- Provide International
- National Council of Churches of Kenya (NCCK)
- St. Joseph Mukasa Health Centre
- Cordis Mariae Health Centre
- Karibu Afrika Kenya
- Slum Dunk Onlus
- SafeCare (PharmAccess Foundation)
- Health-E-Net
- Liverpool School of Tropical Medicine (LSTM)
- Kenya Pediatric Association (KPA).
