= Child Watch Phuket =

Non-profit organization in Thailand

The Child Watch Phuket Association is a humanitarian non-profit organization in Thailand, fighting against child abuse and exploitation. Founded and based in Phuket. Organization aims to help child labourers and enslaved child prostitutes to live normal and healthy child life and find the way out from exploitation.

== Background ==
Since 1998, Child Watch Phuket has helped more than 1,500 children with scholarships, day care and shelter.

In 2006, the “Childcare Holland House” was officially opened by Dr. Supaluck K-Methakul, President of Child Watch Phuket and Mr Paul Voogd, Executive Vice President and founder of Childcare.nu.

== Objectives ==
Child Watch Phuket works to help and rescue children from physical and sexual abuse.

- To save children systematically and professionally.
- To create awareness on children's rights.
- To provide needy children with welfare and basic education.

== Programs ==
Since 1995, Child Watch Phuket has been running a shelter for abused children or children in need of emergency help. The shelter operates 24 hours a day.

- Safe House Program, a shelter home for abused children.
- Prison Program, a day – care center for prisoners' children and children from slums and construction sites.
- Case follow – up Program, legal assistance for children.
- Mobile Teaching Program, education for children.
- Scholarship Program.

== Assistance from NGO's and embassies ==
In 2006, the Lions Club donated 20.000 THB for "Uncle Pitak's Home", a day care center for prisoners' children and children and children from slums and construction sites. In 1998, the Japanese embassy in Thailand purchased a house for Child Watch Phuket.
