= Fundacion Manantiales =

Argentine addiction foundation

Fundacion Manantiales (Manantiales Foundation) is a non-governmental organization, dedicated to the prevention and attendance of addictions. It has 9 seats in Argentina, Uruguay, Brazil and Spain with 14 welfare preventive programs, where around 300 people are daily attended. It was created 16 March 1993, in the city of San Isidro, Province of Buenos Aires (Argentina). It is a consulting member of the OAS and has subscribed an agreement with the UNDCP in Argentina and Uruguay, to offer workshops to prevent drugs in labor areas. At present, 300 people from the different centers are under treatment. It has been the organizer in Argentina and Uruguay of the international prevention campaign “Winners don’t use drugs” and “I feel good without drugs” in which many important figures of the political, artistic and business areas joined against the addictions. Manantiales Foundation created infodroga and infoanorexia, which are telephone information services, 24 hours a day and totally free for all the community. These services have had successful outcomes in the most developed countries and are installed in Buenos Aires and Montevideo (Uruguay). Manantiales Foundation is the only institution in Argentina and Uruguay, that has recently subscribed an agreement with UNDCP and SESI (Social Service for Industries) from Brazil for the implementation of an international prevention program. This program is directed to institutions, communities and companies. The main objective is to give moral awareness about this problem, trying to find better and healthier choices for life, through the participation and commitment of employers and their employees.
