= World Medical Relief =

Non-profit organisation in the USA

World Medical Relief is a multi-funded, non-profit charitable organization based in Detroit, United States. It is presently located in a northern suburb of Detroit, Southfield, MI.

== History ==
World Medical Relief was established in 1953 by Detroit housewife Irene M. Auberlin, who mobilized her friends and family to collect food, baby clothing, cribs, and medicines to ship overseas for a Korean war orphan. The initial help for one small boy turned into a larger mission: relieving the pain and suffering of an entire orphanage filled with 400 children.

World Medical Relief began collecting and distributing recycled medical and dental equipment, medical supplies, and medicines to aid thousands of sick and poor people around the world. By the words of Mrs. Auberlin, they were doing "God's work" by turning the sins of waste into the miracles of mercy. Although Mrs. Auberlin died in 1999, WMR continues to follow the path of a "world class beggar" and helps the poorest countries and citizens of the globe.

In 1966, the organization was granted a State of Michigan pharmacy license to fulfill prescription medication assistance program for low-income senior citizens of the state. In 2010, the agency became the responsible agency to manage the blanket program for the homeless in the Metro Detroit area. The American Red Cross Southeastern Chapter, that had handled the program for many years, changed its focus and gave up the blanket program. Rather than see it discontinue, World Medical Relief agreed to take it over and renamed the program the Blanket Relief for Area Shelters.

George V. Samson is the current president and CEO of World Medical Relief.

== Mission ==
World Medical Relief declares its mission to impact the well-being of the medically impoverished on a local, national, and international basis. It collects financial donations and goods, including medical, dental, and laboratory items, purchases and distributes such commodities. Goods are reported to be distributed in a non-discriminatory manner without regard to race, color, gender, religion, nationality or political beliefs.

The goals of the organization are stated as follows:

- Relieve human suffering.
- Demonstrate respect for all customers, clients, and patients.
- Collaborate with community organizations to provide services to those in need.
- Maintain a proactive approach to improving services provided.

In 2005, World Medical Relief spent $18,405,574 on its charity programs, according to its annual report.
