= Stone Family Foundation =

The Stone Family Foundation is one of the largest international grant makers in the United Kingdom. It aims to supports innovative, entrepreneurial and sustainable approaches to major social problems.

The foundation's main focus has been on water, sanitation and hygiene (WASH).

== History ==
The foundation was set up by John Stone, a self-made British entrepreneur, following the sale of Lombard International Assurance, a life assurance firm for wealthy individuals. After netting £124m (€145m) from its sale to Friends Provident, John Stone and his family set up the Stone Family Foundation in 2005.

The foundation has an endowment of GBP £46 million as of 31 December 2018 and takes strategic approach to its grant making. According to John Stone, "As thinkers from Aristotle to Andrew Carnegie have pointed out, it is harder to give money away intelligently than it is to earn it in the first place. In my case, it has taken me five years to scale up my philanthropy to be able to make significant grants. I wanted to be sure that my money would be put to the best possible use and have the biggest impact on those I chose to help. It does take time to give strategically in this way, but I believe it is better to proceed slowly and carefully, to ensure that philanthropic donations are committed wisely, which should bring more long-term benefit to society and, as others will be more inspired by seeing money well-spent, it should eventually result in bigger funding for charities."

In 2012, the Foundation scaled up its giving. As of that year, its target annual expenditure was £5 million.

== Activities ==
The main focus area for the foundation is water and sanitation in sub-Saharan Africa and South East Asia. To date, funding has been targeted at three countries—Tanzania, Zambia and Cambodia. The Foundation typically supports initiatives that are innovative and entrepreneurial and its current portfolio includes grants to:

- iDE Cambodia
- SNV Cambodia
- Water Aid Zambia
- Water Aid Tanzania

In the UK, the Foundation focuses its funding on adult mental health and young people not in education, employment or training and young offenders.

== See also ==
- Millennium Development Goals
- Philanthropy
- Social entrepreneurship
- Social enterprise
- Sanitation
- Waste management
- Water and sanitation program
- Water supply
- Water supply and sanitation in Sub-Saharan Africa
