= Elizabeth Associations =

German Catholic female charitable associations

Elizabeth Associations were German Catholic female charitable associations which at the start of the twentieth century had 16,000 members in 550 branches.
