= Thrive Africa =

Ghanaian nonprofit organization

- Founded: 2009
- Registration no.: D.S.W/5822
- Purpose: Education, Poverty reduction
- Location: Ghana, West Africa
- Region served: Ghana
- Services: Charitable services, Sustainable development projects
- Method: To work with local stakeholders developing projects that bring positive sustainable outcomes, using the efforts of volunteers to deliver and achieve this vision
- Key people: Maxwell Donkor (Country Director)
- Revenue: Unknown
- Website: thriveafrica.ngo

Thrive Africa is a Ghanaian nonprofit registered charitable body, founded in United Kingdom in 2009 with the aim of assisting local communities across Ghana to improve living standards and educational level through a range of self-sustainable projects.

The charity annually recruits volunteers from across the world and coordinates their efforts to implement development projects, allowing its supporters to not only to promote the advancement of education and relief of poverty, but also to gain personal experience in the development sector.

== History ==
Thrive Africa was founded in 2009 as a registered charity in United Kingdom and Ghana. In 2012 its management was fully transferred to Ghana.

== Notable projects ==
Every year Thrive Africa donate tens of thousands of books working closely with its partner Book-Cycle, the UK charity. It recruits volunteers, who help local communities to establish school libraries and organise health and sanitation workshops.

From 2011 Thrive Africa's volunteers have worked in orphanages, building libraries, building farms for caregivers of HIV/AIDS orphans, running sports lessons and educational workshops, donating clothes and kits for football players.

In 2010 British Government and its development partners made the decision that Ghana should become fully self-sufficient and do without outside help by 2020. Nevertheless, about one third of people in this country live below the poverty line (less than $1.25 a day). Therefore, the Thrive Africa's management aimed at work with the local Ghanaian communities to create long term and self-sustainable projects.
