= Omar-Sultan Foundation =

Bangladeshi charitable organization

- Founded: 2001
- Founder: Alhaz M Nurul Amin
- Purpose: Humanitarian
- Location: Dhaka City
- Origins: Chittagong
- Region served: Bangladesh
- Employees: 150 in 2015
- Website: uca.edu.bd/osf.htm

The Omar Sultan Foundation is a Bangladeshi charitable organization that offers scholarships to underprivileged and meritorious students across the country.

The foundation extends its support to top-ranked Bangladeshi Universities for better and quality education and also helps the underprivileged students of Bangladesh. The United College of Aviation, Science & Management is one of the sister concerns of this foundation.

== History ==
The foundation was established by Chondonaish Thana in Alhaz M Nurul Amin, Bangladesh. Its mission was to create a digital Bangladesh and promote it as a skilled and efficient nation.

Omar Sultan Foundation Computer Lab at Faculty of Business Studies, Dhaka University and Omar Sultan Dental Department at USTC Chittagong received donations from this foundation.

== Activities ==
- Micro Credit Program: help the economic development of villages.
- Students Micro Credit Program: help poor, meritorious students
- Youth Development Project: help jobless youth in becoming independent
- Scholarships: offer scholarships to intelligent students who cannot afford education
- Vocational Training: arrange vocational training to the generation of fully or semi-educated young children who remain jobless.
- Medical Services: support health services are available for people with lesser incomes.
- Establishes import-based industries for rural people.

== See also ==
- Islamic Foundation Bangladesh
- Grameen Foundation
- JAAGO Foundation
