= Lunches for Learning =

American / Honduran nonprofit organization

- Founded: 2005
- Type: Non-profit, Interest group
- Services: Providing a hot meal and education to children of Honduras
- Fields: Educating children
- Website: www.lunchesforlearning.org

Lunches for Learning is a non-profit organization founded in 2004 and incorporated in 2005 by Ron Hicks. Lunches for Learning provides a meal per day to children attending public schools and kindergartens within the Republic of Honduras. Lunches for Learning, Inc. is listed as an incorporated entity in the republic of Honduras, where it predominantly operates.

Lunches for Learning intends to help improvised children eat while getting a public education. The primary objective of the program is to permit children to attend school and receive a basic six-grade academic education (adequate in increasing the chances of a future above the poverty level for an individual in Honduras).

Lunches for Learning provides a daily lunch for elementary school children by utilizing the cooperative efforts of individual contributors, corporate sponsors, and the government of Honduras. Currently, the Lunches for Learning program or L4L accommodates 29 schools and 1,700 children. In the US, L4L's operations are predominantly staffed by volunteers under the leadership of an executive director. In Honduras, L4L employs local Honduran citizens to provide management and administration of this program in the country. Both volunteers and employees in Honduras and the US seeks to keep administrative and logistical costs low so that more hungry children can be fed.

In addition to its main goal, Lunches for Learning also helps to build kitchens and assists World Food Programme (WFP) in transporting legumes, corn, rice, and cooking oil necessary for producing meals.

== Board of directors ==
| Chairman | Craig Simons |
| Vice-chairman | Terry Taylor |
| Secretary | Art Walsh |
| Vice President and Treasurer | Jeff Bohman |
| Director | Linda M. Browder |
| Director | Jacque Digieso |
| Director | Steve Gulledge |
| Director | Kristi Holzimmer |
| Director | Rudiger Lind |
| Director | Armando McCormick |
| Director | Ace Necaise |
| Director | Bill Rivers |

== Staff ==
| Executive director, United States | Phil Dodson |
| Operations Administrator, United States | Mary Lou Monaghan |
| Manager of Honduran Operations | Fernado Ortiz |
| Manager of Government & External Relations | Jessica Gonzales |

== Growth ==
The Lunches for Learning program started with 84 children in 1 school. Since 2004, the L4L Organization sponsors 29 schools and accommodates over 1,700 children.

== Sponsored schools ==
The "Schools" section of the Lunches for Learning website provides an interactive GPS map with map-points in which all L4L program-sponsored schools are shown, including number of students, along with their current community.

- Benito Montoya, El Barrial, Nacaome
- Policarpo Paz Garcia, El Coyolar, Goascoran
- Francisco Morazan, La Peña, Goascoran
- 3 De Octubre, Sabana Redonda, Goascoran
- Jose Cecilio Del Valle, Piedras Blancas, Goascoran
- Nueva Honduras, El Junquillo, Goascoran
- Manuel De Jesus Subirana, Santa Lucia, Goascoran
- Jose Trinidad Reyes, El Picacho, Goascoran
- Jose Trinidad Cabañas, El Rincon, Goascoran
- Andrea Gonzales, El Amatillo, Goascoran
- Jose Trinidad Cabañas, Los Almendros, Goascoran
- Jardin Alegrias Infantiles, El Rincon, Goascoran
- Dr. Juan Lindo, La Puya, Goascoran
- Jose Cecilio Del Valle, Las Posas, Aramacina
- Napoeon Arias Cristales, Es Resbaloso, Goascoran
- Dionicio De Herrera, El Junquillo, Nacaome
- Dr. Ersy Mejia, Jicaro Abajo, Nacaome
- Jose Santos Guardiola, Jicaro, Nacaome
- Pedro Nufio, El Rincon, Nacaome
- Jose Angel Cerrato, Torrecillas, Nacaome
- Jardin El Porvenir, El Rincon, Nacaome
- Francisco Marazan, Bañaderos
- Ramon Amaya Amador, Estacones
- Ana Garcia, Tierras Morenas
- Romulo Alvarado, El Caragual
- Julio Reyes Diaz, Mapachin
- Manuel Bonilla, Las Tablas
- Gustavo Adolfo Andino, Rincon Ocotillo
- 15 de Septiembre, El Tamarindo
