= True Volunteer Foundation =

Non-governmental organisation

True Volunteer Foundation (TVF) is a non-governmental organisation which aims to empower people through education. It is headquartered in London, England and was established in 2004 as LIFECYCLE Fundraising. Though its aims to eliminate poverty are similar to many charities, it differs through its operating model, which emphasises a low cost base and works to link together the corporate sector, small charity partners and volunteers. Its core principle and trademark is Pay to Work, and its volunteering ethos is based on the vision that everyone should have a social career which is run in parallel with their paid jobs or studies.

Lifecycle Fundraising originally held charity number 1113789. It was incorporated on 20 January 2005 and changed its name to True Volunteer Foundation on 1 May 2008. Lifecycle is now one of 5 charity brands actively promoted by True Volunteer.

== Overview ==
True Volunteer Foundation is dedicated to alleviating poverty globally through education. It does this through various means, including the building of schools and the provision of microfinance, capacity building and employment training. It is headquartered in London, England and was established in 2004 by a group of like-minded individuals who wanted to give something back.

The organisation hosted its first fundraising event in Kempton Park, raising funds to build three schools in Sri Lanka; it expanded this to a network of 18 schools across Asia and Africa. Today, True Volunteer Foundation spans across 33 countries, reporting that its projects directly impacted 325,009 people in 2013.

Its core principle and trademark, Pay to Work, enables the organisation to operate within a low cost base and helps ensure no less than 90 per cent of project donations go direct to end beneficiaries. True Volunteer Foundation is reported to be funded through corporate donors and events, and utilises pro bono services from corporate partners and members of the public to operate within what it terms as a pioneering financial model.

== Guiding principles ==
=== Pay to Work ===
True Volunteer Foundation works with over 100 volunteers who donate between 5 and 35 hours per week to run projects for the organisation. True Volunteers do not get paid and do not claim general expenses. The organisation calls this principle Pay to Work, which is a registered trademark of the charity. The Pay to Work principle is central to its model and is embedded into every aspect of the charity's work.

Pay to Work enables the organisation to work within a low cost base. According to Michael Padmanathan, founder of True Volunteer Foundation, "this approach is highly appealing for volunteers and corporate sponsors, who are often put off by the high running costs of traditional charities".

Volunteers are vital to the financial model: by not claiming a charge for their services or expenses they are effectively meeting a significant proportion of the organisations’ cost base.

=== Social career ===
True Volunteer Foundation's volunteering ethos is based on the vision that everyone should have a social career which is run in parallel with their paid jobs or studies. People volunteer for the organisation on their own terms, specifying how much time they want to dedicate; and they can volunteer either from home, the office, in the field or commuting to and from their day jobs or studies.

Called ‘True Volunteers’, each person is given a functional or project role within the organisation which matches their interests, skills and availability. Roles range from Head of Department to Country Manager, and from Accountants to Fundraisers. The organisation's goal is to provide a platform for individuals to give back to society so they can empower those less fortunate than themselves.

=== Corporate social responsibility ===
The corporate sector is the major source of funding for True Volunteer Foundation, either through project-based funding as part of a company's corporate social responsibility (CSR) program, or the provision of pro bono professional products and services. The charity offers bespoke charity projects, allowing sponsors to input into the projects in a way that aligns with the company's own goals and priorities: its proposition to the corporate sector is "let us do the work you want to see done". To date the organisation states it works with 50 corporate partners offering tailored CSR programmes.

Its funding model is set up to enable corporate partners to support its work across three areas: funders and pro bono partners who meet core costs (e.g. office costs, marketing and administration); partners to fund charitable projects; and pro bono event partners to meet costs in running the charity's event programme.

=== Partnership approach ===
True Volunteer Foundation states that its model of working with three parties makes it unique within the charity sector: the charity works to link together the corporate sector, small charity partners and True Volunteers. The organisation uses this approach to overcome three issues it identified in the sector, which are corporates needing support with charitable giving; small charities needing support with securing funding and delivering projects; and volunteers wanting to give back on their own terms.

The organisation works to provide approximately 92 small charities with the resources to become successful. This may include access to funding, volunteer resources or project management support, so that True Volunteer Foundation and its charity partners can jointly deliver projects. To date it states that it has jointly delivered over 100 International and UK Projects with its small charity partners.

The charity also partners with over 30 universities in the UK and Europe, providing student work placements across different study disciplines. Its aim is to offer volunteer roles which educate the next generation in social responsibility.

== Main projects ==
=== Computing for One Million people, Madagascar ===
In 2010, True Volunteer Foundation partnered with the Madagascan Government, Microsoft and the Dodwell Trust to roll out a country wide program bringing essential computing resources and skills to one million people by 2015. The partnership provided 480 computers in 40 training rooms to teach computer literacy in schools and regional resource centres across Madagascar.

=== Wimbledon Sporting Project, UK ===
Launched in 2012 to coincide with the London 2012 Olympic Games, the Wimbledon Sporting Project is a five-year educational programme, which includes films, books and sporting activities provided to schools in the London Borough of Merton at no cost. Through a mixture of sport history, stories from sporting champions and practical sports packages, the aim of the project is to inspire the next generation of sporting champions.

In May 2012, the Common Ground film premièred at the Odeon in Wimbledon, bringing together celebrities, corporate donors and schools to provide sustainable sports education to schools across Merton. 21 sporting celebrities, 18 young sporting hopefuls, 39 sponsors and partners, 27 True Volunteers and over 60 individuals from different walks of life all donated their time, expertise and resources to produce an inspirational film and book for young people. It is estimated the film would have cost over £90,000 to produce, but due to its partner ecosystem, only cost £400.

Celebrities starring in the film and book include Jacquie Beltrao, Greg Rusedski, Will Greenwood, Steve Cram, Daley Thompson, Alec Stewart, Sean Kerly and John Scales.

The project aims to provide free sporting opportunities to 27,000 school children across the London Borough of Merton.

=== Nuffield School, Sri Lanka ===
Nuffield School for deaf and blind children is located in Kaithady, which is in the Jaffna District situated in the Northern Province of Sri Lanka. Civil War fought for three decades in Sri Lanka had a disastrous impact on the entire country, leaving most of the buildings at the Nuffield School badly damaged. To significantly improve the future for the school children, True Volunteer Foundation raised funds for a complete refurbishment of the facilities. Completed in September 2012, the renovated facilities now provide accommodation and schooling for up to 300 deaf and/or blind children per year.

=== Vinh Quang Primary School, Vietnam ===
Vinh Quang Primary School educated approximately 100 children in Kien Giang province within Vietnam. To enable the school to support more local children, in 2012 True Volunteer Foundation funded a two-storey extension, doubling the school's size and adding classroom space and resources to allow Vinh Quang Primary School to accommodate up to 300 school children.

All funds for the project were raised by a group of cyclists who took part in True Volunteer Foundation's Cycle Vietnam event in November 2011. The team cycled 400 km across Vietnam and Cambodia, raising thousands of pounds to build the school in Vietnam and support an Orphanage in Cambodia.

To promote the challenge within the UK, True Volunteer Foundation managed two events in the run up to the trip to increase visibility. This included entering a team of cyclists in Cyclothon UK 2011 and hosting a celebrity tennis tournament day at David Lloyd Leisure Centre in Raynes Park. Special guests attending the celebrity tennis tournament included Mike Read, Victor Ubogu and Sue Mappin.

== Supporters ==
True Volunteer Foundation is supported by 42 high-profile public figures and celebrities. Supporters include Sir Cliff Richard, Jacquie Beltrao, Steve Cram, Ainsley Harriott, Greg Rusedski, Sean Kerly and Daley Thompson.

True Volunteer Foundation is also supported by Baroness Helen Newlove, and was part of her vision of a ‘Civic Service’ through providing volunteering opportunities for the Department for Communities and Local Government (DCLG) ‘Social Action Week’ in November 2011 and 2012.

In conjunction with Baroness Newlove, True Volunteer Foundation set up and launched the Newlove Neighbourhoods Fund, an integrated nationwide programme which addresses crime in seven regions across the UK. Through its work with Baroness Newlove, True Volunteer Foundation featured as the preferred partner in projects related to the Big Society, and featured in two government reports commissioned by Prime Minister David Cameron.

== Finance ==
The recorded income of all brands in True Volunteer Foundation is very small, falling from £7,291 in 2007 to £2,181 in 2008. The charity commission does not require accounts for this charity.

LIFECYCLE did not charge for its services and offered a commitment that "no commissions, wages or admin costs are deducted from the donations received."

True Volunteer states that its annual operating costs are approximately £1000 and include audit fees. In 2008, therefore, its administrative costs would appear to consume nearly 50% of its income of £2181. Despite this, Lifecycle alone says it has benefited over 30,000 children in 2008.

== History ==
LIFECYCLE Fundraising logo

True Volunteer Foundation was founded by Michael Padmanathan in late 2004, with the idea of giving something back to the community. It started out as a series of informal fundraising events among a network of friends and acquaintances, but has since expanded to organising both corporate and private fundraising activities on a substantial scale.

During 2005, True Volunteer Foundation became a UK registered limited company, an organisational member of the Institute of Fundraising and a member of the National Council for Voluntary Organisations. The main highlight of 2005 was the Fundraising Ball in April, which attracted 300 guests and raised in excess of £25,000. This was used to fund the construction of a children's home and three nursery schools in Sri Lanka.

In the first quarter of 2006, True Volunteer Foundation expanded its operations to include new corporate social responsibility and private wealth management programmes. True Volunteer Foundation has recently become a registered charity in the United Kingdom and was registered with the Charity Commission for England and Wales on 19 April 2006. Now Lifecycle has become part of a larger organisation which is called True volunteer Foundation. It has charitable status, and so has become a fundraising organisation that is "feeding" itself. That is to say it is now a charity supporting itself and "partner" charities, and seems to have positioned itself as if it had a large charity status. Its web site claims support from the Royal Family and sporting personalities, and although it may be doing good works in many countries, seems to apply exaggeration and spin. True Volunteer Foundation is also split into five other categories including Greencycle, Lifecycle, and other "cycles" and "Charity Levels", incorporating very diverse objectives, as yet not apparent on the Charity Commission web pages.

=== Historical successes ===
LIFECYCLE's focus in 2005 was on the areas most affected by the Tsunami disaster, particularly in the country of Sri Lanka. Through a combination of fundraising events and donations from members, LIFECYCLE was able to provide funding for various projects, including:

- the construction of a children's home in eastern Sri Lanka, in partnership with Arobanam Children's Fund
- the production of an English teaching pack, in partnership with Volunteers for English in Sri Lanka
- the servicing of 12 solar powered radios for radio listener groups in Madagascar, through the Dodwell Trust

In 2006, as well as continuing to fund reconstruction efforts in Sri Lanka, LIFECYCLE is expanding its operations with new projects in countries to include Bulgaria, Nepal, India and Madagascar. LIFECYCLE has completed the following projects in the first quarter of 2006:

- provision of two new wells, a pharmacy and five latrines in Madagascar, in partnership with AZAFADY
- a successful, life-saving heart operation for a girl of 16 months in Sri Lanka, in partnership with the SHIVA Charity

== Awards ==
In 2013, True Volunteer Foundation received an award from the Merton Partnership Volunteering awards for its Wimbledon Sporting Project and won the People's Choice Award at the Forum3 exhibition in 2010.

== Registrations and affiliations ==
- LIFECYCLE is a not-for-profit limited company registered in the United Kingdom, with company registration number 5338347.
- LIFECYCLE is a UK registered charity, with registered charity number 1113789.
- LIFECYCLE is an organisational member of the Institute of Fundraising, registration number Z62539.
- LIFECYCLE is also a member of the National Council for Voluntary Organisations, number 6566.
