= Samsara Foundation =

Thai charitable foundation

Samsara Foundation, Thailand
- Samsara Foundation Logo
- Formation: 2001
- Type: Charitable foundation
- Headquarters: Chiang Mai, Thailand
- Official language: English, Thai and Dutch
- Chairman: Carl Samuels
- Key people: Annelie Hendriks (Director of capital projects)
- Website: Samsara Foundation and Stichting Samsara (Dutch language)

Funded by individual gifts and contributions from a variety of organizations, Samsara Foundation supports the education of underprivileged rural children. According to the organization, its mission is "to contribute to the education and health of underprivileged children in rural areas of northern Thailand."

Samsara was established in 2001 as a charitable foundation under Dutch law. The foundation considers education key to poverty alleviation and to the development of Thailand from a poor to a developed society. Now headquartered in Chiang Mai, in 2008, the organization received foundation status from the government of Thailand.

== Focus ==
Samsara works out of northern Thailand - in one of the country's poorest provinces, Mae Hong Son. Priority is given to very basic and concrete projects like the installation of water purification systems, the building of kitchens and dormitories, and the provision of educational tools. Besides these projects, Samsara provides scholarships for individual children who are promising students, but may not have the means to continue their studies without financial support.

Samsara focuses its efforts on remote mountain villages, home to many hill tribes like the Karen people and the Hmong. The average annual income per family is around 10,000 baht (approximately €210, US$333).

== Operations ==
Projects are managed by director Annelie Hendriks - the founder, volunteer, and a Dutch national. Ratana Keunkeaw, a Thai citizen, assists her in her efforts. They work in close collaboration with the Department of Education in the Mae Sariang District and with the directors of the schools who are involved.

Samsara's philosophy is to seek and actively promote participation in the community. Therefore, villagers voluntarily do most of the construction work. Many of them are parents of the schoolchildren. These actions contribute to a better relationship between school and village, and promotes support for education within the community.

Most of the schools in the mountains of Mae Sariang District (185 schools with 27,000 children) are only accessible in the dry season. The rainy season makes it difficult to use the narrow, slippery roads. Construction and monitoring, therefore, must be accomplished during a seven-month period (November through May).

A Samsara project may provide several different benefits to a single school or similar benefits to several schools. Furthermore, some schools have been the recipients of improvements for more than one project.

Since 2002, Samsara Foundation has provided the following facilities, services, and amenities at schools in northern Thailand: 41 school dormitories, 25 school canteens, five school libraries,16 toilet buildings, water purification installations at 73 schools, 10 cement rainwater collecting tanks for 48 schools, books for 44 schools including furniture and small facilities, for 100 schools medicines; for 40 schools teaching materials for children with special needs, and for many children hundreds of one-year scholarships.

=== Scholarships ===
In 2008, Samsara began an initiative called “Tomorrow's Leaders”. Under the terms of this program, Hill Tribe children with top school marks will be offered an opportunity to continue their education at a vocational school or university for up to six years. Samsara's ordinary scholarship program funds uniforms, school fees, learning materials, and dormitory accommodation for children from very poor families.

=== Partnerships ===
Samsara's work is made possible through partnerships with individuals, family foundations, and with internationally active charitable organizations. The latter include Rotary International, Rotary Clubs, organizations such as the Alberta Government's Wild Rose Foundation, and Wilde Ganzen foundation of the Netherlands. Another major partner is the Mae Sariang school district, which actively participates in helping to implement foundation projects.
