= The Canadian International Learning Foundation =

Canadian charity

Canadian International Learning Foundation
- Abbreviation: CanILF
- Founder: Ryan Aldred
- Type: Funded by donations. Some projects receive additional funding from CIDA
- Location: Ottawa, Ontario, Canada
- Volunteers: 40
- Website: http://www.canilf.org/

The Canadian International Learning Foundation (CanILF) is an Ottawa, Ontario, Canada-based, volunteer-run registered charity which provides and promotes professional education in areas of the world affected by war, illness and poverty (at-risk areas).

== Mission ==
CanILF seeks to reach its goals through the following activities:

- Funding for Scholarships and Infrastructure:Awarding scholarships to students who demonstrate academic potential, community service and leadership, and to provide educational equipment (such as computers or textbooks) to the schools they attend;
- Online Courses:Providing education to students via the Internet, including courses in entrepreneurship, business management or Information Technology (IT); and
- Mentoring:Offering instruction, advice and practical assistance on planning, management and proposal writing to the leaders of educational institutions.

== Projects ==
=== Afghan-Canadian Community Center (ACCC) ===
The Afghan-Canadian Community Center (ACCC), is a safe and secure place for women to receive an education. The ACCC provides courses in Business Management, IT, English and Health Care to approximately 1,500 women and men. Students at the ACCC also receive recognized Canadian online education via the Southern Alberta Institute of Technology and the Canada e-School. The ACCC's programs provide the skills its students need to obtain employment at a cost-per-student from $10 to $25 per month. Once employed, students support themselves and their families (on average, 6 family members per student), give back to their communities and participate in the reconstruction of Afghanistan. Because of ACCC training, more than 500 students have obtained employment or promotions.

The school presently receives more than half of its operating expenses through the Kandahar Capacity Project, which is funded by the Canadian International Development Agency’s Kandahar Local Initiatives Program.

=== Uganda Literacy and Education Program ===
CanILF also operates a project to benefit the Community Empowerment Program at St. Paul's Kabira Adult Attention and School of Orphans (KAASO) via its Uganda Literacy and Education Program. The Community Empowerment Program provides women and men in the community with education in basic literacy, business, agriculture and traditional artisanry.

=== Yemen Micro-Project ===
The Yemen Micro-Project (YMP) is The Canadian International Learning Foundation's first project in the Middle East. The YMP's goal is to help to connect local partners in Yemen with educational and information technology expertise in Canada through collaborative initiatives. Canada Bridges, an organization that has extensive experience in offering business education in Yemen, has agreed to help CanILF choose suitable partners and establish relationships with the Government of Yemen.

== Volunteers ==
Members of the Foundation in Ottawa meet in The Glebe on a weekly basis.

== Partners ==
- Southern Alberta Institute of Technology (SAIT): A group of approximately 30 students at the Afghan-Canadian Community Center (ACCC) are currently studying Business Management via online courses taught online by the Southern Alberta Institute of Technology (SAIT).
- CW4WAfghan: Provided extensive financial and administrative support to the Canadian International Learning Foundation and the two organizations maintain a close partnership to promote and sustain women's education in Afghanistan.
- EdGen: EdGen host the profiles of students of the Afghan School Project, thereby encouraging donors from across the globe to help students receive life-changing education.
- Vital English: Vital English donated 100 months of blended e-learning courses to CanILF for the benefit of the partner schools in Afghanistan and Yemen.
- Clout Marketing: Clout have been providing their services to the Canadian International Learning Foundation since 2009.
