= Global H2O =

US-based non-profit organization

Global H2O Logo

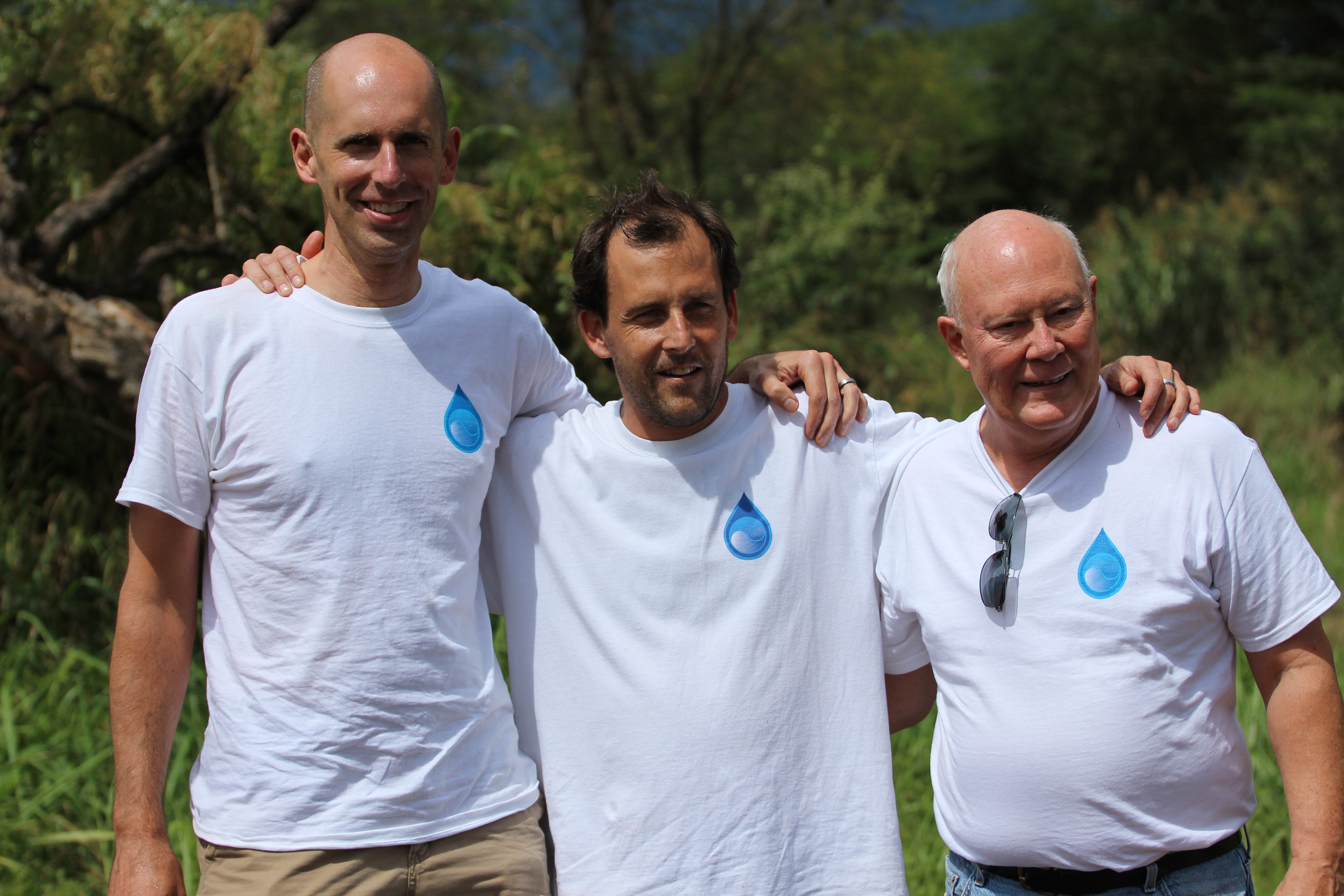
Three Founders in Uganda

Global H2O Group (established November 2009) is a 501(c)(3) registered charity in the United States, which was founded by James DeWitt Wilde, David Simons, and Chris Wooten. According to the charity, Global H2O has funded over 30 projects in Northern Uganda, helping 60,000 people to obtain clean drinking water from the production of standard United Nations designed boreholes (deep wells with hand pumps).

It now operates in the UK, Germany and United States for fundraising purposes. It has also partnered with the Royal Order of Saint Lazarus in Ireland to deliver clean drinking water to the impoverished of Northern Uganda. Global H2O is not politically oriented, not religion oriented, all volunteer, with the goal for efficient investment of donor funds (at least 80% of funds must be allocated to projects).

== Mission ==
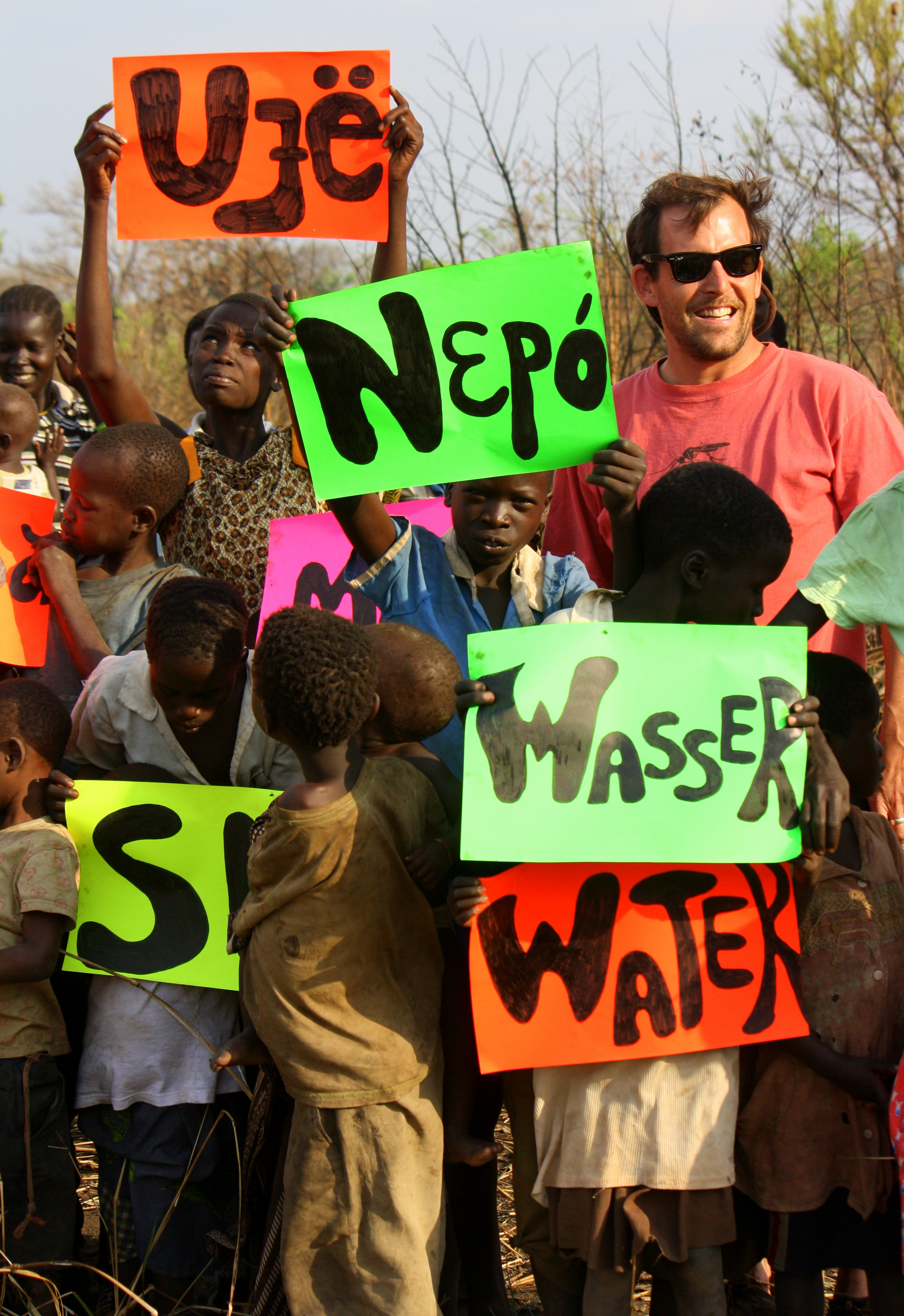
Water in Uganda

The mission statement is as follows:

Our goal at Global H2O is to provide clean water sources to communities through construction of wells, rain harvesting facilities, and spring boxes. We contract with organizations in developing countries to identify where we can significantly improve lives in a short period of time, with minimal expense and complexity.

A $20 donation provides clean water to one person for the rest of his or her life.

The water problem is vast, but the solution is simple and effective.

== A Clean Water Initiative ==
Wilde discovered the water crisis during an expedition in the Himalaya on Cho Oyu, the world's sixth highest mountain. According to his web site (www.jamesdewittwilde.com), James fell ill with dysentery and it was during these moments of agony during the descent that he "understood" the Water, Sanitation and Hygiene issues (WASH). Using PR from his 7 Summits campaign and thanks to the help of Sage Business Solutions, Modry Design Studio, and Great Outdoor Provision Company, he secured the initial funding and key fundraising software for Global H2O.

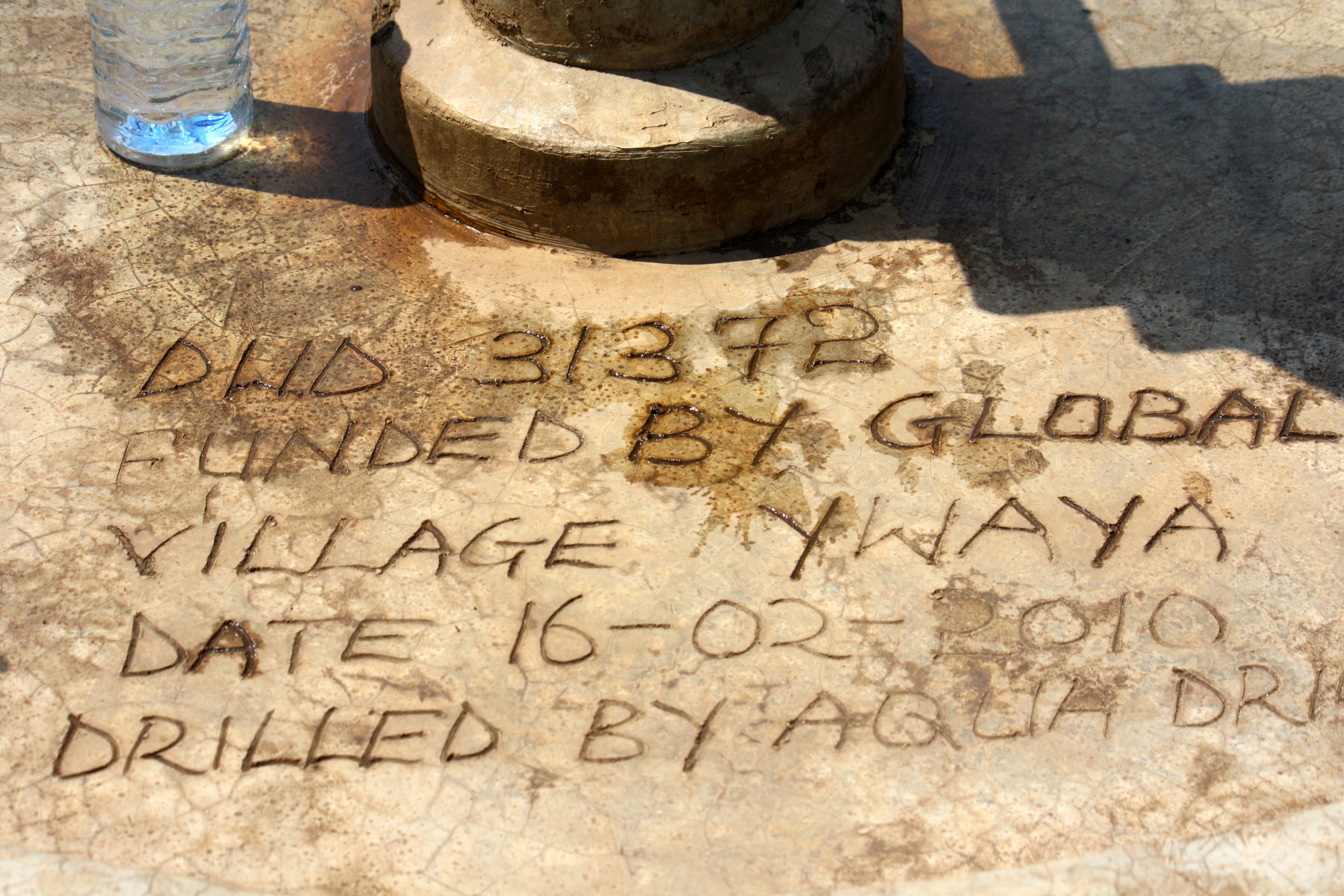
Global H2O's first well

As a result of funding provided for his Everest expedition in 2010, Wilde decided to self fund his expedition and use the sponsors funds to finance the very first water project in 2010. He was accompanied by Madara Repse, a professional photographer/ journalist, who in turn shot the photos which have become the face of the company today. The project which was completed in February 2010 is still in use today, and Wilde makes a point of visiting it every time he is in Northern Uganda. Wilde's vision which was immediately shared by his partners, Chris Wooten and David Simons was to build an all volunteer team with a clear focus on efficiency of allocation of donations to projects. The company commits as part of its policy to ensure that at least 80% of all donations make their way into projects. The current level is 91% according to their web site. The tenets were quickly developed to include non affiliation to religion or politics and to demonstrate all work completed on behalf of the donors.

The company grew rapidly during the ensuing two years adding affiliated Limited Liability Companies in Austria, Germany, and the United Kingdom. The company has seen 350% donation growth on average per year since its inception across all affiliates.

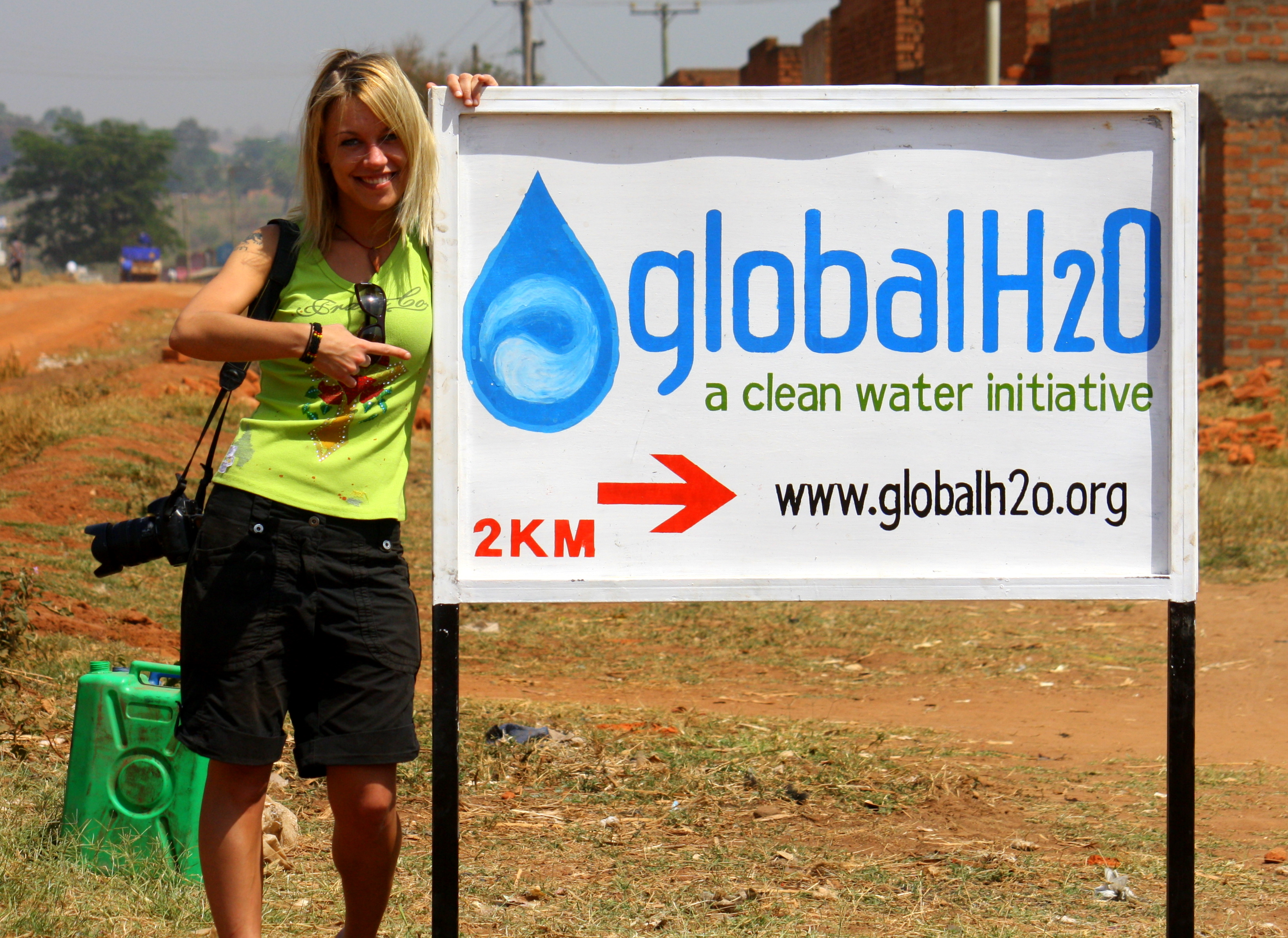
Madara Repse & Global H2O

== Board Members and Executive Committee ==
During this time, Chris Wooten joined the board as Chief Marketing Officer and Davis Simons became Administrative Officer. Later, the board grew to include Michael Sosnowy as Chief Financial Officer and Stefanus van der Merwe as Chief Operating Officer and David Humphrey as non-executive voting member.

Later, Executive Committee Members joined as the international affiliates grew within the organisation. David Humphrey (Head of Germany and now permanent Board Member), Virginia Anne Newton (Head of Fundraising) and Rob Shaw (Head of the United Kingdom) are all part of the decision team.

== The South Sudanese Refugee Crisis in Uganda ==
In 2014, Global H2O undertook an initiative together with its supplier Sub Saharan Drilling U LTD to install 20 wells in three different refugee camps in Uganda. Phase one consisted of eight wells which were installed in the Kiryandongo and Rwamwanja Camps, four in each. These were funded thanks to donations from Stop Hunger Now (a Raleigh, North Carolina–ased charity focused on hunger relief via donated meals), Christ Church and the Episcopal Diocese of North Carolina.

Phase two consists of 12 wells and 10 latrines which will be built in the Lamwo installations near the South Sudanese border. These were funded by donations from Knorr Bremse Global Care, Tantris Restaurant (Thanksgiving 2014), STI Consulting and B.telligent. These wells and latrines will be completed by May 2015.

Phase three which is currently in the funding stage, involves a much larger investment of over $1 million.

== Annual fundraisers ==
The core events currently occur in Munich, Germany, Charlotte and Raleigh North Carolina.

Thanksgiving (Munich, Germany) The Thanksgiving event, sponsored by the Eichbauer family (owners of the Tantris Restaurant in Munich), takes place every year on Thanksgiving with all proceeds from the food and drinks benefitting the charity.

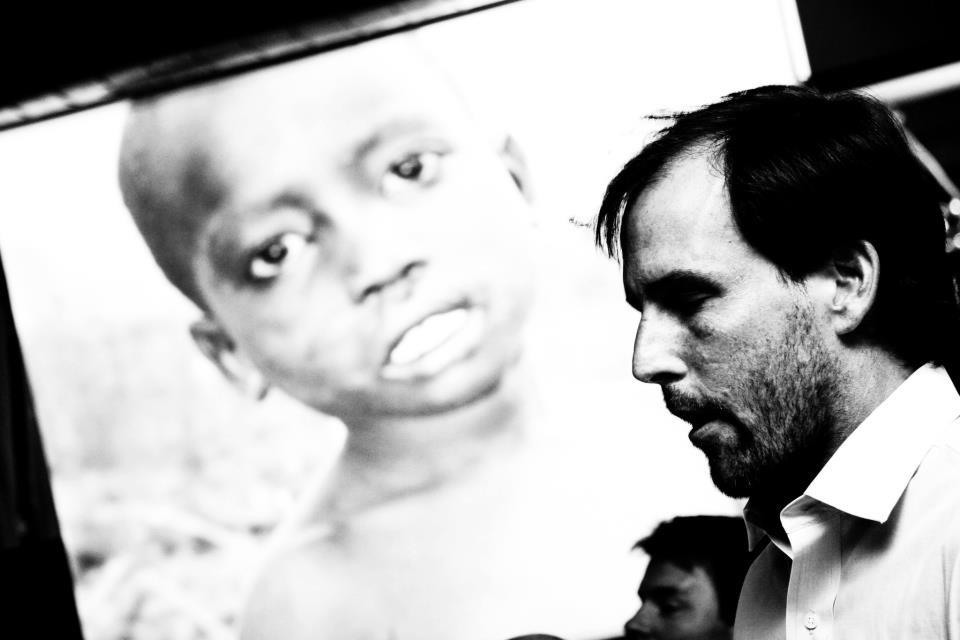
Thanksgiving Fundraiser

Oktoberfest (Raleigh, North Carolina) In Raleigh, the US team has created Oktoberfest in a response to the well established Thanksgiving event. Silent auctions, beer, sausages, pretzels and music from the Little German Band help the team to also create a fun atmosphere for helping the people in Uganda.

NODA Grand Prix (Charlotte, North Carolina) In the hope to involve the sporting community, the NODA Grand Prix was created and has become a huge success. All ages and types of racers gather in the spring in Charlotte to compete for prizes or simply for fun to fundraise for Global H2O.

Christmas (Dublin, Ireland) The Royal Order of the Hospitaller of St Lazarus of Jerusalem in Dublin has invited Global H2O the last two consecutive years to be their international charity of choice.

== Moving Mountains ==
The story of Global H2O is captured in the recently published Autobiography of James Wilde, Moving Mountains. The book contains details of Wilde's climbing background and how it transformed into the idea to form a charity focused on bringing clean drinking water to those in need. According to the charity, the proceeds of all books sold are going to benefit the charity directly.

== See also ==
- Millennium Development Goals
- WASH
- International development
