= Refresh Bolivia =

- Legal status: Charity
- Region served: Bolivia
- Services: Construction, healthcare, teaching
- Website: https://www.refreshbolivia.com/

Refresh Bolivia is a student nonprofit organization originally founded at Harvard University. The organisation is dedicated to constructing a "maternal and child care oriented community health center" in Cochabamba, Bolivia. Previous international chapters of the organization have existed at the University of Toronto, McMaster University, and Queen's University. Current active chapters include the Cambridge chapter, Claremont chapter, and Rochester chapter. These include students from Harvard University, the Claremont Colleges, and the University of Rochester. According to the group, it has benefited "more than 2,000 people" by "constructing ecological bathrooms; teaching health workshops to men, women and children; and conducting research on the health needs of our target communities." Each January, students are recruited by the community to participate in a "two week-long service project."
