= Creative Services Support Group =

The Creative Services Support Group (CSSG) is a registered charity, based in New Delhi, India, established to aid underprivileged young adults through skills training and mentorship within the creative sectors.

== History ==
CSSG was founded in 2011 by Anand Kapoor.

Working with marginalized youths from several partner organisations, CSSG provides guidance to newfound adults who aren’t on traditional career paths, through mentorship, advice, and creative career opportunities. CSSG works with a youth to learn their interests, train them in the relevant skills, pair them with a likeminded mentor and provide them with a career opportunity.

== Charity dinners ==
CSSG uses high-profile events for fundraising. In an article of the Financial Express, Kapoor, founder of CSSG, states that “charity doesn’t need to be miserable […] if there is a celebratory cheer, giving becomes a joyful act and something that is transferred to the eventual recipients.”
