= Veniños =

Veniños (Venezuelan Children in Need), is a UK registered charity, dedicated to improving the lives of street and shanty town children in urban Venezuela. It has no religious or political affiliation. The funds raised by Veniños are used to support projects run by well respected non-governmental organisations operating in Venezuela".

Veniños was founded by a couple of British citizens who lived in Venezuela for some years. During that time they each witnessed, first hand, some of the reality of disadvantaged children's lives. With experience of NGO organisations working to overcome the difficulties of lives based in poverty, these ladies after moving back to the UK wanted to keep helping such worthwhile projects, and so looked to formalise their efforts by creating a new charity.

Lisa Tylee, one of Veniños founders, lived in Venezuela and says of her experience, “having worked with street and shanty town children in Caracas, I know that young people need our support and our understanding to help them improve their lives... so I hope that by raising awareness here, as well as funds, we can help these children.”

From 2003, Trustees and Volunteers have put together time and effort to build the charity, to support a series of projects that are closely monitored and that are designed to make a positive impact on the lives of children living in poverty in Venezuela.

== Ongoing projects: Walking the walk ==
In Venezuelan neighbourhoods such as “Los Samanes” or “Los Rosales”, Veniños has worked with communities and local charity groups to develop sustainable educational and sport projects. Through supporting local teachers, childcare centres and sponsoring sport clubs, these initiatives bring more opportunities and a better standard of life to children and young people.

In another project, Veniños have helped Hogar Bambi -a child care centre - to fund a lawyer to provide children with identity papers. This problem has been a common one in Venezuela and not having official papers delays the child's access to the education system. You can find more information about Veniños work in Veniños Newsletters or on their Projects’ page Further information about Hogar Bambi can be found their web site

== Fundraising activities: Awareness and funds with creativity ==
With Volunteer groups in different cities, many people have pooled their talents to help the Veniños cause and make a difference to lives in Venezuela. Initiatives have come from various areas: running marathons and organising music concerts in London, auctioning paintings in Nottingham, hosting Salsa parties in Aberdeen or walking great distances from Cornwall to Scotland, Venezuelans and people from different countries have found a way to give their time and effort for a good cause. For the last 5 years, Veniños supporters have been involved with a series of larger fundraising events, such as:

- The London Marathon 2005
- Savoy London’s Ballroom
- Big Sur marathon in California
- Walking Lands End to John O’Groats, 5-a-side football tournaments, Céilidh- Latin nights
- Concerts at the Bolivar Hall in London. With the support of the Bolivarian Republic of Venezuelan Embassy in London
- First Venezuelan Art exhibition in Nottingham
- The Hydro Active Women's Challenge - London 2007
- Loch Ness Marathon
- Anglo Latin American Foundation Fiesta
