= Kidney Education Foundation =

Indian health organization

- Established: 2010
- Founder: Dr Sanjay Pandya
- Headquarters: Rajkot, Gujarat, India
- Fields: Medicine, Healthcare, Education, Kidney Diseases, Nephrology
- Official languages: English, Chinese, Spanish, French, Arabic, Hindi, Russian, Portuguese, German, Japanese and 29 other languages.
- International Liaison Officer: Dr Tushar Vachharajani
- Website: www.kidneyeducation.com
- Remarks: Active (90 million hits in 130 months)

The Kidney Education Foundation (KEF) is a health awareness organization focused on kidney diseases. It provides information about the prevention and care of kidney diseases through books and websites currently translated in 39 international languages.

The Golden Book of World Records title, as awarded to the Kidney Education Foundation on 8 March 2017.

The Asia Book of Records title, as awarded to the Kidney Education Foundation on 15 March 2017.

The organization has been founded by an Indian nephrologist, Dr Sanjay Pandya, in 2010 to create awareness about kidney disease prevention primarily through free access to information to the general population. For this common cause, nephrologists across the globe have joined this mission, including many leaders of the international nephrology community such as Dr Giuseppe Remuzzi, Past-President of the International Society of Nephrology, who prepared the Italian version and Dr Guillermo García-García, President of the International Federation of Kidney Foundations, who prepared the Spanish version of the book and website.

The book and website offer comprehensive information about common kidney-related disorders, and their prevention and care on a single platform in many different languages.

The American Society of Nephrology (ASN) published an extensive article in March 2020, recognising the Foundation's work and mission. KEF is endorsed by the World Kidney Day (WKD) campaign as an external organisation supporting World Kidney Day activity. ERA-EDTA (European Renal Association - European Dialysis and Transplant Association) has cited KEF as its first resource for patient education.

== History ==
In 2005, Dr Sanjay Pandya began drafting a book to educate patients about the prevention and care of kidney diseases and common issues related to kidneys. His book, written in Gujarati is titled Tamari Kidney Bachavo, which translates to Save Your Kidneys. Attributing to its success in the state, the book was later translated into Hindi (2008) by Pandya to make it accessible to a wider audience across India.

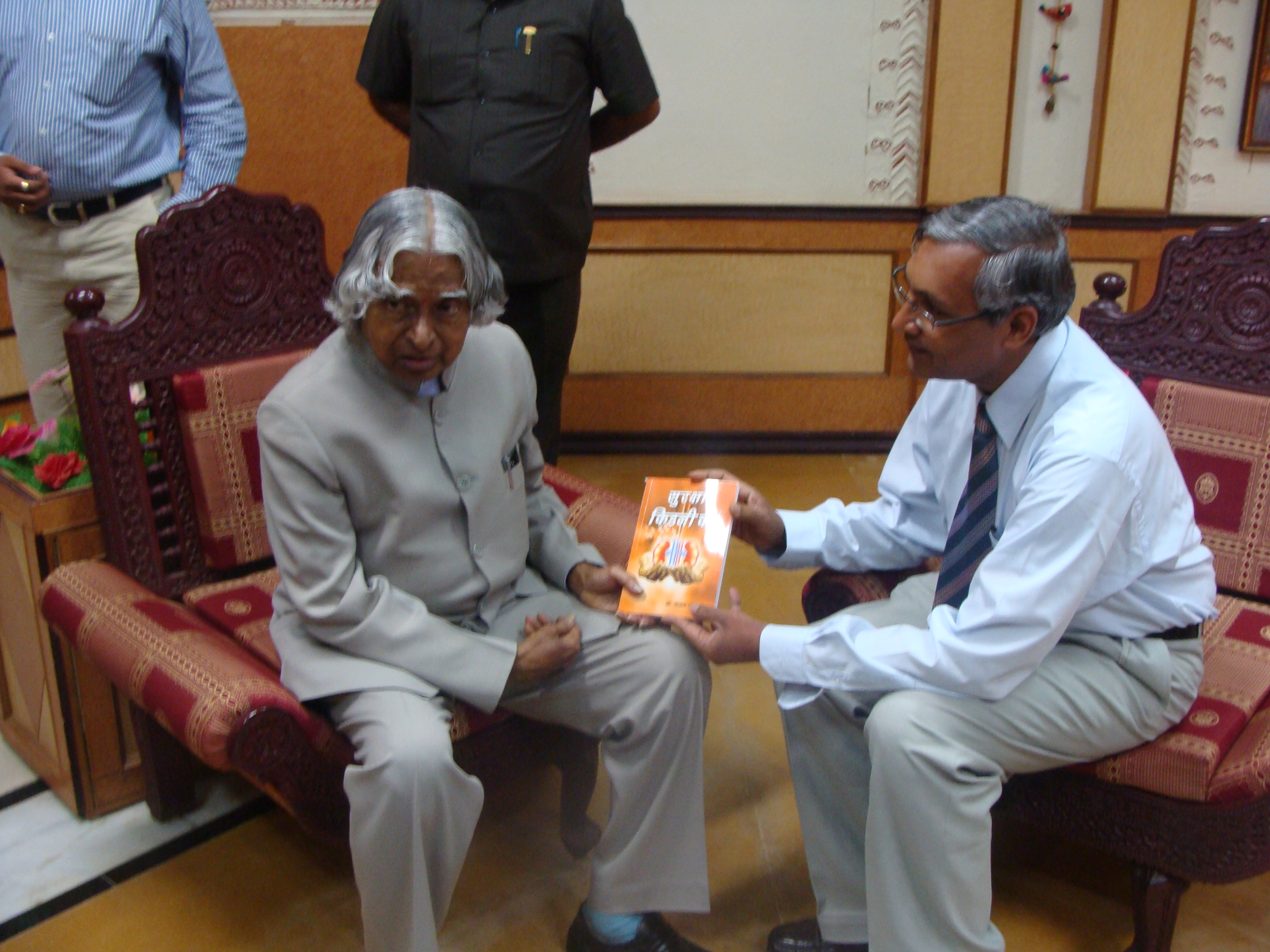
Dr APJ Abdul Kalam congratulating Dr Sanjay Pandya on the release of his book, Save Your Kidneys

In 2010, Pandya founded the Kidney Education Foundation to overcome the two biggest hurdles of inaccessibility and language barriers, to reach the global population. Initially, the Hindi and Gujarati editions were released on the internet to achieve this goal with the launch of the KEF website. In 2012, Pandya wrote and released a free online English edition. Following these early books, several nephrologists from across the world joined this cause with time.

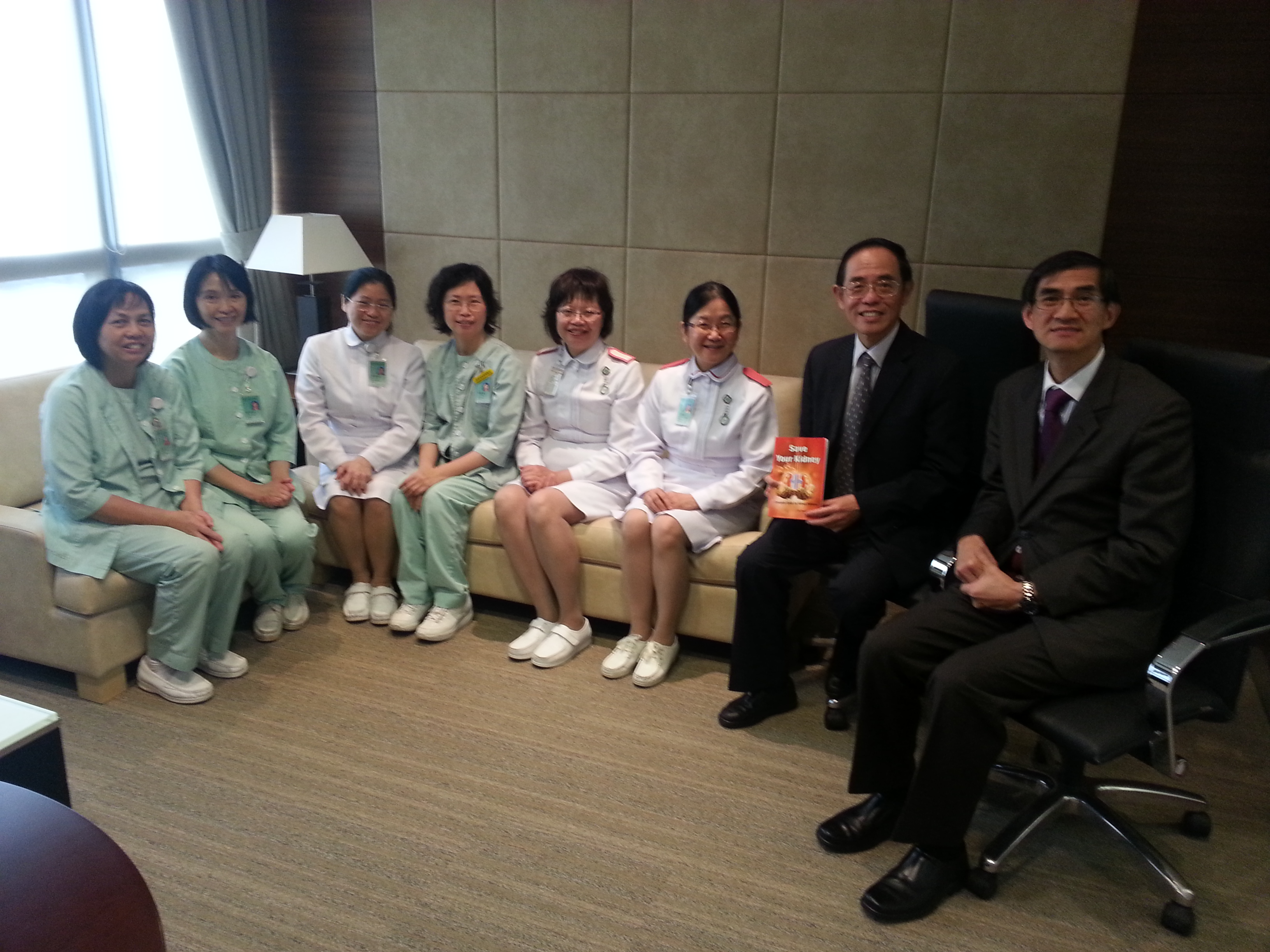
Book release of Save Your Kidneys in Chinese

Various teams of international nephrologists began to translate the content in their native languages, making it available to their local vernacular (non-English speaking) audience. In a span of eight years, a team of more than 100 nephrologists at the Kidney Education Foundation has developed books and websites in 39 languages, including major international languages such as English, Italian, Chinese, Spanish, French, Arabic, Hindi, Russian, Portuguese and Japanese.

== Organization ==
The Kidney Education Foundation consists of nephrologists from around the globe, who play the role of individual language project leaders. The team efforts are driven by Founder and Chief Mentor, Dr Sanjay Pandya from Rajkot, India. Pandya coordinates with all the nephrologists, thus ensuring the preparation and publication of the book and website.

Dr Tushar Vachharajani serves as the International Liaison Officer who seeks world kidney experts with similar philanthropic interest aligned with the Foundation's mission. He invites them to join this initiative and help prepare a version of the kidney book and/or the website in their native language.

Other notable members of the team are Dr Giuseppe Remuzzi, Past-President, International Society of Nephrology, Kidney Fund, Bergamo, Italy; Dr Guillermo García-García, President, International Federation of Kidney Foundations, Guadalajara, Mexico; Dr Takashi Yokoo, Chief Professor and Medical Director, Jikei University School of Medicine, Tokyo, Japan; Dr Ho Chung Ping, Medical Director, Integrated Dialysis Facilities (HK) Ltd., Hong Kong, China; Dr Edison Souza, Professor, Nephrology University of Rio de Janeiro, Brazil; Dr Abdou Niang, Secretary-General, Senegalese Society of Nephrology, Dakar, Sénégal; Dr Valeriy Shilo, Associate Professor of the Department of Nephrology, FPDO MSMSU, Russia; Dr Ashok Kirpalani and Dr Dilip Pahari, Ex-President, Indian Society of Nephrology, India; and Dr Sanjib Kumar Sharma, Nepal.

The book and website are currently available in 39 different languages (See table below.) The book is also made available for free on WhatsApp Messenger.

Sr. No.	Language	Book	Website	Author(s)
1	Gujarati (2010)	તમારી કિડની બચાવો	Kidney in Gujarati	Dr Sanjay Pandya (India)
2	Hindi (2010)	सुरक्षा किडनी की	Kidney in Hindi	Dr Sanjay Pandya (India), Dr Shubha Dubey (India)
3	Marathi (2011)	सुरक्षा किडणी ची	Kidney in Marathi	Dr Jyotsna Zope (India)
4	English (2012)	Save Your Kidneys	Kidney in English	Dr Edgar Lerma (USA), Dr Sanjay Pandya (India)
5	Telugu (2012)	మూత్ర పిండాల భద్రత	Kidney in Telugu	Dr Krishnan Srinivasan (India)
6	Bangla (2013)	আপনার কিডনি বাঁচান	Kidney in Bangla	Dr Dilip Pahari (India), Mrs Pumpa Dutta (India)
7	Kutchi (2013)	આંજી કિડની ભચાયો	Kidney in Kutchi	Dr Sanjay Pandya (India)
8	Malayalam (2013)	വൃക്കകളെ സംരക്ഷിക്കുക	Kidney in Malayalam	Dr Jayant Thomas Matthew (India)
9	Arabic (2014)	حافظ علي كليتك	Kidney in Arabic	Dr Dawlat Hassan Sany (UAE)
10	Chinese (2014)	拯救 你的肾	Kidney in Chinese	Dr Ho Chung Ping (Hong Kong)
11	Kannada (2014)	ಕಿಡ್ನಿ ಸುರಕ್ಷೆ	Kidney in Kannada	Dr Mallikarjun Khanpet (India)
12	Portuguese (2014)	Previna-se, Salve Seus Rins	Kidney in Portuguese	Dr Edison Souza (Brazil), Dr Gianna Kirsztajn (Brazil)
13	Punjabi (2014)	ਸ਼ੁਰਕਸ਼ਾ ਕਿਡਨੀ ਦੀ	Kidney in Punjabi	Dr N P Singh (India)
14	Spanish (2014)	Cuide su Riñón	Kidney in Spanish	Dr Guillermo García-García (Mexico), Dr Jonathan Chávez-Iñiguez (Mexico)
15	Tamil (2014)	உங்கள் சிறுநீரகங்கள் சேமிக்க	Kidney in Tamil	Dr Sanjay Pandya (India), M Srinivasan (India)
16	French (2015)	Sauvez Vos Reins	Kidney in French	Dr Abdou Niang (Senegal), Dr Samira Elfajri Niang (Senegal)
17	Italian (2015)	Salviamo i Nostri Reni	Kidney in Italian	Dr Giuseppe Remuzzi (Italy), Dr Daniela Melacini (Italy)
18	Japanese (2015)	腎臓を守るために	Kidney in Japanese	Dr Takashi Yokoo (Japan)
19	Sindhi (2015)	पंहिंजी किडनीअ खे बचायो	Kidney in Sindhi	Dr Ashok Kirpalani (India)
20	Urdu (2015)	آپ گردے محفوظ کریں	Kidney in Urdu	Dr Imtiyaz Wani (India)
21	Nepali (2016)	आफ्नो मृगौला बचाऔँ	Kidney in Nepali	Dr Sanjib Kumar Sharma (Nepal)
22	Assamese (2016)	আপোনাৰ বৃক্কদ্বয় সুৰক্ষিত কৰি ৰাখক	Kidney in Assamese	Dr Ramen Basiya (India), Dr Pranamita Kalita (India)
23	Russian (2016)	СОХРАНИТЕ ВАШИ ПОЧКИ	Kidney in Russian	Dr Valeriy Shilo (Russia), Dr Ivan Drachev (Russia)
24	Swahili (2016)	Okoa Figo Lako	Kidney in Swahili	Dr Gabriel L Upunda (Tanzania), Dr Bashir Admani (Tanzania)
25	Oriya (2016)	ଆପଣଂକ ବୃକକ୍ର ସୁରକ୍ଷା	Kidney in Oriya	Dr R N Sahoo (India)
26	German (2016)	Rette Deine Nieren	Kidney in German	Dr Hans-Joachim Anders (Germany), Dr Seema Baidya Agrawal (Germany)
27	Thai (2017)	คำแนะนำสำหรับการดูแลและรักษาโรคไต	Kidney in Thai	Dr Kriang Tungsanga (Thailand)
28	Persian (2017)	کلیه های خود را حفظ کنید	Kidney in Persian	Dr Hamid Mohammadjafari (Iran)
29	Sinhala (2017)	ඔබගේ වකුගඩු සුරකිමු	Kidney in Sinhala	Dr Surjit Somiah (Sri Lanka)
30	Meitei (2017)	Save Your Kidneys	Kidney in Manipuri	Dr Sanjeev Gulati (India)
31	Lao (2017)	ຄຳແນະນຳສຳລັບການດູແລ ແລະ ການປິ່ນປົວພະຍາດໄຂ່ຫຼັງ	Kidney in Lao	Dr Noot Sengthavisouk (Lao PDR)
32	Serbian (2017)	Sačuvajte svoje bubrege	Kidney in Serbian	Dr Zoran Paunic (Serbia)
33	Turkish (2018)	Böbreklerinizi Koruyun	Kidney in Turkish	Dr Faruk Turgut (Turkey)
34	Vietnamese (2018)	Hãy gìn giữ thận của bạn	Kidney in Vietnamese	Dr Ha Phan Hai An (Vietnam)
35	Filipino (2018)	Pangalagaan ang inyong Mga 'Kidney'	Kidney in Filipino	Dr Edgar Lerma (USA), Dr Elizabeth Angelica Lapid-Roasa (Philippines)
36	Korean (2018)	콩팥을 건강하게	Kidney in Korean	The Korean Society of Nephrology – Dr Yong-Soo Kim (Korea)
37	Malay (2019)	Selamatkan Buah Pinggang Anda	Kidney in Malay	Dr Hin-Seng Wong (Malaysia), Dr Suryati Yakob (Malaysia)
38	Ukrainian (2021)	Бережіть свої нирки	Kidney in Ukrainian	Prof. Dmytro Ivanov (Ukraine)
39	Amharic (2021)	ኩላሊትዎን ይታደጉ	Kidney in Amharic	Dr Esete Getachew (Ethiopia)
