= New Brunswick Innovation Foundation =

Canadian foundation

- Abbreviation: NBIF
- Formation: 2002
- Legal status: Foundation
- Headquarters: Fredericton, New Brunswick
- Services: venture capital and applied research investments
- CEO: Jeff White
- Website: nbif.ca

New Brunswick Innovation Foundation (NBIF) is an agency that seeks to promote entrepreneurship in the Canadian province of New Brunswick by making venture capital investments in startup companies and funding applied research to developing new intellectual property. An independent non-profitable corporation, the Foundation manages $120 million, and leverages $310 million more from other sources. The foundation is based in Fredericton, New Brunswick.

== Investment areas ==
The New Brunswick Innovation Foundation (NBIF) invests in research and development projects and early-stage companies in these key areas:

- Knowledge Industries: This includes information and communication technologies, geomatics, and various engineering fields.
- Life Sciences: Focuses on biotechnology, marine science, and wood science.
- Advanced Manufacturing: NBIF invests in companies involved in plastics and rubbers, metalworking, and electronics.
- Value-Added Natural Resources: This sector encompasses agriculture, forestry, minerals, aquaculture, and fisheries.
- Energy and Environmental Technologies: Investments are made in energy generation, storage, infrastructure, water and wastewater management, air and climate solutions, and recycling and waste management.
