= List of non-governmental organizations in Thailand =

This is a list of charitable projects and non-governmental organizations (NGOs) working in Thailand or connected with Thailand.

== Animal welfare ==
- Elephant Nature Park
- Soi Dog Foundation
- Wildlife Friends Foundation

== Community development ==
- Asia Foundation
- ActionAid
- Adventist Development and Relief Agency (ADRA)
- American Refugee Committee
- Andaman Discoveries
- Bangkok Community Help Foundation
- CARE International Thailand
- Caritas International Thailand
- Catholic Office for Emergency Relief and Refugees (COERR)
- Cooperazione e Sviluppo
- Department for International Development
- Development and Education Programme for Daughters and Communities Center (DEPDC)
- European Commission Humanitarian Office (ECHO)
- Food and Agriculture Organization (FAO)
- Heifer Project International
- Jesuit Refugee Service (JRS) Thailand
- Openmind Projects Foundation
- Peace Corps Thailand
- Plan International
- RADION International Foundation
- Rotary Club
- United Nations Association of Thailand (UNAT)
- United Nations Development Program (UNDP)
- United Nations Office for the Coordination of Humanitarian Affairs (OCHA)
- United States Agency for International Development (USAID)
- World Food Programme

== Disabled ==
- Adventist Development and Relief Agency (ADRA)
- Caritas International Thailand
- Christian Foundation for the Blind in Thailand
- Christian Care Foundation for Children with Disabilities
- Father Ray Foundation

== Education and children ==
- ActionAid Thailand
- Adventist Development and Relief Agency (ADRA)
- The Alliance for Safe Children
- Asia Foundation
- Baan Gerda home for AIDS orphans in Lopburi
- Baan Unrak
- Bangkok Post Newspaper Foundation
- Caritas International Thailand
- Catholic Office for Emergency Relief and Refugees (COERR)
- Child Watch Phuket
- Children's Organization of Southeast Asia (COSA), Chiang Mai
- Christian Care Foundation for Children with Disabilities
- Compassion International
- Development and Education Programme for Daughters and Communities (DEPDC)
- Dear Burma
- End Child Prostitution, Child Pornography and Trafficking of Children for Sexual Purposes (ECPAT) International
- Father Ray Foundation
- Foundation For Children
- Isara Foundation
- Mercy Ministries Foundation
- OpenmindProjects- INGO
- Plan International Thailand Foundation
- RADION International Foundation
- Sister Joan Evans
- SOS Children's Village Thailand
- Starfish Country Home School Foundation
- Thai Children's Trust
- The Human Development Foundation
- United Nations Children's Fund (UNICEF)
- Volunteers in Asia
- World Vision Foundation of Thailand
- Youth With A Mission
- YWCA Pak Kret

== Elderly ==
- Adventist Development and Relief Agency (ADRA)

== Environment ==
- Freeland Foundation
- Green Fins Thailand
- Greenpeace, Southeast Asia, Thailand
- Plant A Tree Today Foundation
- World Wide Fund for Nature

== Human rights ==
- Amnesty International Thailand
- Asian Forum for Human Rights and Development (FORUM-ASIA)
- Children's Organization of Southeast Asia (COSA)

== Medical ==
- Adventist Development and Relief Agency (ADRA)
- ANESVAD Foundation
- Caritas International Thailand
- Catholic Office for Emergency Relief and Refugees (COERR)
- Jesuit Refugee Service Thailand
- Médecins Sans Frontières
- Saint Camillus Foundation, runs Camillian Hospital
- Thai Red Cross Society

=== HIV/AIDS ===
- Baan Gerda home for AIDS orphans in Lopburi
- The Human Development Foundation
- Pearl S. Buck International (Thailand)

== Women ==
- Asia Foundation
- International Rescue Committee
