= International non-governmental organization =

Form of non-governmental organization

An international non-governmental organization (INGO) is an organization which is independent of government involvement and extends the concept of a non-governmental organization (NGO) to an international scope. INGOs can admit members affiliated to government authorities as long as it does not interfere with their freedom to express themselves. INGOs operate under the principles of neutrality, humanity, impartiality, and independence. Around the world, there are about 75,000 international organizations and about 42,000 of them are active. While INGOs conduct a variety of activities, the most common areas of focus are economic development, public health, education, human rights, culture, science, and humanitarian assistance.

NGOs are independent of governments and can be seen as two types: advocacy NGOs, which aim to influence governments with a specific goal, and operational NGOs, which provide services. Examples of NGO mandates are environmental preservation, human rights promotions or the advancement of women. NGOs are typically not-for-profit, but receive funding from companies or membership fees. Many large INGOs have components of operational projects and advocacy initiatives working together within individual countries.

Intergovernmental organizations such as International Labour Organization (ILO) and United Nations are formed when sovereign states form treaties but INGOs are not bound by state treaties when operating internationally.

INGOs can either be private philanthropic organizations such as Carnegie, Rockefeller, Gates, and Ford Foundations or as arms of existing international institutions like the Catholic Church. After World War II, INGOs began to increase due to the need for economic development or humanitarian needs. Such INGOs include SOS Children's Villages, Oxfam, Catholic Relief Services, Care International, and Lutheran World Relief. However, the influence of INGOs started to extended heavily in the 1980s.

Except for incorporation under national laws, no current formal legal status exists for INGOs, which can lead to complications in international law. INGOs have been trying to get a legal status under the international law. They have not legal personality and therefore, no formal rights. INGOs must then operate under state laws even though they still have to follow the principles of independence and neutrality. China for instance, only allows foreign NGOs that have Chinese sponsor organizations and the government has the power to close and examine their offices and question their staff.

== History ==
International non-governmental organizations emerged as a result of the need for humanitarian aid as global problems increased after World Wars. No single government could solve these problems leading to the formation of INGOs. Governments began offering greater support to private, international organizations, and NGOs in the 1980s as a way of allowing more time and resources to be spent on national projects. Often, a humanitarian aid organization would clash with a government's approach to tackle a situation. In such cases, INGOs have sought out autonomy to extend help regardless of political or ethnic affiliation.

In 1910, the Union of International Associations (UIA) were the first to suggest that a "super-national" status be given to international organizations with diplomatic intentions without governmental influence. The International Law Association (ILA) modified this, adding that this "super-national" organizational status may be adopted for associations formed for no profit. One of the oldest organization to be referred to an INGO is Save the Children-UK that was founded in 1919. Since then, INGOs have been operating under their founding principles to provide different community welfare models.

== Activities ==
The number of INGOs performing different activities has varied considerably over time. Many INGOs today provide relief and developmental aid to communities that are in crisis. These programs include health-related projects such as HIV/AIDS awareness, prevention and treatment, clean water, and malaria prevention. INGO roles extend to education-related projects such as ensuring equitable education for all genders and providing books. Overall, INGOs help to provide the social services that governments do not provide. International non-governmental organizations are some of the first responders to natural disasters, like hurricanes and floods, or crises that need emergency relief such as the International Red Cross and Red Crescent Movement. Other organizations, like the International Justice Mission, are working to make judicial systems more effective and legitimate. Other INGOs promote micro-finance and education which directly impact citizens and communities by developing skills and human capital while encouraging citizen empowerment and community involvement.

NGOs, in general, account for over 15% of total international development aid, which is linked to economic development. As of 2007, aid (partly contributed to by INGOs) over the past thirty years is estimated to have increased the annual growth rate of the bottom billion by one percent.

== Criticisms ==
Given they are usually supported by donations, a popular concern about INGOs is where the money goes and whether it is spent efficiently. High administrative costs can be an indication of inefficiency, enrichment of employees at the expense of beneficiaries, embezzlement or misdirection of funds to corrupt local officials or dictatorship. Numerous attempts have been made to remedy the accountability of INGOs surrounding where and for what their money is being used. Websites like Charity Navigator and GiveWell attempt to provide transparency as to how much goes to administrative costs, what activities money is spent on, whether more donations would be helpful, and how cost-effective the activities are compared to other charities or potential activities. However, INGOs have also played an important role in pressuring international organizations to strengthen their accountability mechanisms, opening them up to greater scrutiny by stakeholders.

Moreover, multiple organizations often exist to solve the same problem. Rather than collaborating to address a given situation, organizations frequently interact as competitors, which creates bottlenecks of treatment and supplies. Conflicts typically require organizations to quickly provide aid to regions with conflict. As such, ensuring immediate and future care quality is paramount. To this point, INGOs must prepare regions for when they leave by providing the tools and guidance necessary to support their citizens. More research must be done on the impacts of INGO support from the perspective of the recipient country or region, as much of currently published research has been completed from the lens of a Westernized donor or INGO.

Another criticism is that many of the people benefiting from INGOs have no way to influence those activities and hold the organizations accountable (for example by threatening to withhold donations). Some charitable organizations solicit the participation of local communities to avoid problems related to intercultural competence, and avoid unintended consequences due to lack of buy-in or lack of knowledge about local conditions. Some INGOs have been accused of lack of partnership with local organizations since they have all the funding and they do not credit these local institutions and often do not give them equal respect. Additionally, INGOs often require/expect their partners to follow a Western model which can be incompatible with local community needs.

In March 2015, the European Journal of International Relations criticized the impact of INGOs on government decision-making, claiming they are slowing integration of developing countries into the global economy.

== Notable international NGOs ==
=== Multiple interdisciplinary projects ===
- ActionAid
- ACTED
- ADRA
- AIESEC
- CAFOD
- CARE
- CRS
- Cuso International
- Danish Refugee Council
- Food For The Poor
- Islamic Relief
- International Olympic Committee
- Mercy Corps
- Oxfam
- Save the Children
- SOS Children's Villages
- Tzu Chi Foundation
- World Vision International
- Plan International
- Eastern Caribbean-Southeast Asia Chamber

=== Research ===
- ResearchX

=== Economics ===
- International Federation of Freight Forwarders Associations (FIATA)
- International Air Transport Association (IATA)
- World Economic forum

=== Health ===
- Amref Health Africa
- Doctors Without Borders
- GAVI
- The Global Fund to Fight AIDS, Tuberculosis and Malaria

=== Children and youth ===
- Compassion International
- International Federation of Catholic Parochial Youth Movements (FIMCAP)
- Plan
- Reggio Children Foundation
- Save the Children International
- SOS Children's Villages
- Terre des hommes
- World Association of Girl Guides and Girl Scouts (WAGGGS)
- World Organization of the Scout Movement (WOSM)
- World Vision International
- AIESEC
- Justice Call
- UNOY

=== Education ===
- European Association of History Educators
- Junior Achievement
- The Library Project
- OpenmindProjects- INGO

=== Human rights ===
- International Rescue Committee
- Human Rights Watch
- Human Rights Foundation
- Amnesty International
- Commonwealth Human Rights Initiative
- Friends of Peoples Close to Nature
- Humanists International
- International Christian Concern
- International Commission against the Death Penalty
- International Federation for Human Rights
- Protection International
- Survival International

=== Environmental ===
- Greenpeace
- International POPs Elimination Network
- International Union for Conservation of Nature
- World Wide Fund for Nature

=== Water, sanitation, and hygiene ===
- WaterAid
- Water.org
- Initiative: Eau
- Water for People

=== Multilateralism ===
- Sister Cities International
- World Federation of United Nations Associations

=== Religion ===
- International Federation of Catholic Parochial Youth Movements (FIMCAP)
- Lutheran World Relief

=== Space and technology ===
- COSPAR
- Internet Society
- RIPE NCC

== See also ==
- European Convention on the Recognition of the Legal Personality of International Non-Governmental Organizations
- Foundation (non-profit)
- International Non-Governmental Organisations Accountability Charter
- Nonprofit organization
- Think tank
- World Polity Theory
