= Vias =

Vias or VIAS may refer to:

- Vias (rail company), in Germany
- Vias, Hérault, a commune of the Hérault département in France
  - Vias station
- Voluntary Industrial Aid for Spain, an organisation during the Spanish civil war

== See also ==
- Via (disambiguation)
