= Via =

Via or VIA may refer to the following:

== Arts and entertainment ==
- Via (Volumes album), 2011
- Via (Thalia Zedek album), 2013
- VIA (music), Soviet and Russian term for a music collective

== Businesses and organisations ==
- Via Foundation, a Czech charitable foundation
- VIA Programs (Volunteers In Asia), an American non-profit organization
- VIA Technologies, a Taiwanese manufacturer of electronics
- VIA University College, a Danish university college
- VIA Vancouver Institute for the Americas, a Canadian education organization
- Volunteers in Africa Foundation, an American non-profit organization
- VIA, stock ticker for:
  - Viacom (1952–2006)
  - Viacom (2005–2019)
- Vià, a French television network

=== Transportation ===
- VIA Metropolitan Transit, in San Antonio, Texas, U.S.
- Via Rail, rail operator in Canada
- Via Transportation, a global transportation technology company
- Air VIA, a former Bulgarian airline
- VIA Airways, a Bulgarian airline, now Fly2Sky Airlines
- Via Airlines, a former American airline
- Viasa, a former Venezuelan airline, ICAO airline VIA
- VIA Motors, an American commercial electric vehicle manufacturer

== Science and technology ==
- Via (electronics), an electrical connection between conductor layers in a printed circuit board or a microchip
- Via (moth), a genus of moths in the family Noctuidae
- Virtual Interface Adapter, a network protocol
- Virtual Interface Architecture, a networking standard used in high-performance computing

== Other uses ==
- Videira Airport, Brazil (IATA code VIA)
- Via (geomancy), a geomantic figure
- Via (surname), including a list of people with the name
- Values in Action Inventory, a proprietary psychological assessment measure
- VIA, a brand of instant coffee by Starbucks
- Rokospol Via, a Czech aircraft design
- Octavia "Via" of the Ars Goetia, a character in the animated series Helluva Boss

== See also ==
- Vias (disambiguation)
- Roman road (viae Romana)
- Viaduct, a kind of bridge
