= CFBT =

CFBT may refer to:

- Campaign for Better Transport
- Christian Foundation for the Blind in Thailand
- CfBT Education Trust, charity in the United Kingdom
- CFBT-FM, radio station in Canada
- Compartment Fire Behaviour Training, special training and techniques for interior firefighting.
