= CBT =

CBT most commonly refers to:

- Cognitive behavioral therapy, a psychotherapeutic approach

CBT or cbt may also refer to:

== Broadcasting ==
- CBT-FM, a radio station in Grand Falls-Windsor, Canada
- Certified Broadcast Technologist, a professional title

== Businesses ==
- Cabot Corp (NYSE:CBT), a chemical manufacturer
- Cincinnati Bell Telephone, an American telco in Ohio
- Connecticut Bank and Trust Company, a regional banking institution that merged into Bank of New England

== Computing ==
- .cbt, an extension for tarred comic book archive files
- Complete binary tree, a binary tree data structure where all levels are filled
- Computer-based testing, electronic administering of examinations
- Computer-based training
- Core-based trees, a proposal for making IP Multicast scalable by constructing a tree of routers
- Closed beta test, a beta version released to a select group for testing

== Publishing ==
- cbt (publisher), Munich, Germany
- Children's Book Trust, Delhi, India
- Committee on Bible Translation, for the New International Version

== Science ==
- Cannabitriol, a phytocannabinoid
- Center for Biochemical Technology, India
- Complete binary tree, in computer science
- Coulomb blockade thermometer, in physics
- Core body temperature, in biology and medicine

== Sport ==
- Commonwealth Bank Trophy, in Australian netball
- Competitive Balance Tax, in Major League Baseball
- Confederação Brasileira de Tênis (Brazilian Tennis Confederation)

== Transport ==
- Campaign for Better Transport (disambiguation), several advocacy groups
- Ceneri Base Tunnel, a railway tunnel in Switzerland
- Compulsory Basic Training, a British motorcycling certification

== Other uses ==
- Cadet Basic Training at the United States Military Academy
- Cock and ball torture, a sexual activity
- Cock and Ball Torture (band), a German grindcore band

== See also ==
- Chicago Board of Trade (CBOT)
