= COSA =

COSA is an acronym and may refer to:

- Circles of Support and Accountability, are groups of volunteers with professional supervision to support sex offenders as they reintegrate into society after their release from incarceration
- Committee on Sustainability Assessment, a non-profit global consortium of institutions, which uses participatory methods to pioneer the scientific measurement of sustainability in agriculture
- COSA, a 12-step family program of Sex Addicts Anonymous
- Children's Organization of Southeast Asia (COSA)
- Colliery Officials and Staffs Area of the National Union of Mineworkers, a British trade union
- Company of Science and Art

== See also ==
- Cosa
