= Radion =

Radion may refer to:

- Radion (physics), a scalar field in quantum field theory in spacetimes with additional dimensions
- A nightclub in Amsterdam
- A DC comics villain or toxic substance (see List of DC Comics metahumans and List of objects in the DC Universe)
- RADION International
- Radion (given name)
