= Bzr =

Bzr may refer to:

- GNU Bazaar
- Benzodiazepine receptor (also known as the GABA_{A} receptor)
- Béziers Cap d'Agde Airport
- Toyota Levin/Trueno BZ-R
