= Heinz Drossel =

German anti-Nazi activist

- Heinz and his wife Marriane Drossel, who he saved during the Holocaust and married in 1946, when this photo was taken
- Born: 21 September 1916; Berlin, Germany
- Died: 28 April 2008 (aged 91); Simonswald, Germany
- Occupation(s): Attorney, judge, and Head of the Courts Council
- Known for: Saving Jewish refugees
- Spouse: Marianne Hirschfeld (m. 1946)
- Awards: Righteous Among the Nations (1999); Federal Cross of Merit (2001); Wallenberg Medal (2004)

Heinz Drossel (German: [haɪnts ˈdʁɔsl̩]; 21 September 1916 – 28 April 2008) was a German lieutenant in World War II who was named one of the Righteous Among the Nations, shared with his parents, for helping Jews escape persecution. He was the son of Paul and Elfriede Drossel, both anti-Nazis, and shared their political philosophy. Drafted in November 1939, Drossel served in the Battle of France before serving on the Eastern Front for the rest of the war. He saved a woman, Marriane Hirschfeld, who became his wife after the war. He also freed Soviet soldiers to avoid execution. He and his parents also save a woman Margot, her parents, Lucie and Jack Hass and Ernst Frontheim, who became Margot's husband after the war.

Drossel and his parents Elfriede and Paul Drossel received the title Righteous Among the Nations from Yad Vashem on 12 January 1999 in recognition of the risk they had taken to hide and care for Jews during the war. In 2001, he received the Federal Cross of Merit, the highest German civilian award. In 2004, he received the Wallenberg Medal given to humanitarians.

== Personal life ==
Born in Berlin, Germany on 21 September 1916, Drossel was the son of Elfriede (1892–1975) and Paul Drossel (1880–1954). He completed law school in 1939.

Drossel's parents were anti-Nazis and they refused to join the Nazi Party. Because he would not join the extreme German nationalist party, he was unable to practice law and was drafted into the German Army.

His parents were retired and living in Senzig, near Berlin during World War II (1939–1945). They also had an apartment in Berlin, but left the city during the war to avoid the bombing.

== World War II ==
Drossel served the German Army for six years. He fought in the Battle of France in 1940 before being transferred to the Eastern Front on the border of the Soviet Union (USSR). In 1942, he was commissioned a lieutenant. Drossel was loyal to his troops, but hated Nazism. Drossel tried to help a soldier who did not think he could shoot anyone for Nazi Germany. When the soldier was threatened with execution if he did not fire his gun, Drossel advised him to shoot in the air. Unable to do that, he was shot by a firing squad. Drossel said of the man, "He was the only hero in my life."

Rather than executing several Soviet prisoners as ordered in 1941, Drossel helped them escape. He later released a Russian officer. In 1942, he saved a woman, Marianne Hirschfeld, while on leave. She was in the process of jumping off a bridge in Berlin. Drossel found out that she was a Jew who would rather kill herself than be sent to a concentration camp. He let her stay in the family's apartment in Berlin. Drossel provided her food and shelter temporarily. He also gave her money to find a safer place to stay.

When he was wounded, he went to his parents' house to recuperate. Ernst Fontheim approached Drossel the evening of 26 March 1945 and asked for his help. Frontheim had been renting the summer home of Drossel's neighbor, Frieda Kunze, and was living there with his future wife Margot and her parents, Lucie and Jack Hass (Note: Kunze had worked for Ernst's father, Dr. Georg Martin Fontheim, who with his wife, Eva Irene, were arrested on 24 December 1942 by the Gestapo. Jews and non-Jew German citizens were outlawed from contact, but Kunze had continued to see the family friends and help Ernst.) since 30 January 1943. They had forged identification papers, claiming to be a family named Hesse who had left the city due to air raids. They lived by purchasing food on the black market. Someone had reported that they were Jews to the authorities. The Drossels provided food, a place to store their belongings, and helped them find a place to hide out. Ernst and Jack stayed at the Drossels' apartment in the Tempelhof quarter of Berlin, sharing it with a family who moved in after their home was destroyed. Margot and Lucie lived in another apartment. The Gestapo came to Senzig looking for the four the following night. (After the war, Margot and Ernst married and emigrated to the United States, settling in Ann Arbor, Michigan. Ernst Frontheim worked at the University of Michigan's Atmospheric, Oceanic and Space Sciences Department as a senior research scientist.)

Drossel returned to the Eastern Front and led troops against the Red Army. He was imprisoned for disobeying orders by the Waffen-SS (the combat branch of the Nazi Party) to lead his men in a "suicide attack" on 4 May 1945. (Note: A version of the events is that when the SS unit ordered Drossel's soldiers to shoot and kill him, Drossel ordered that they shoot the SS unit.) Drossel was arrested, court-martialed, and sentenced to death. The Russian Army advanced into Germany, freed Drossel from the German prison, and then put him in a Russian prison camp, where he remained for a couple of months or until the end of the year.

== After the war ==
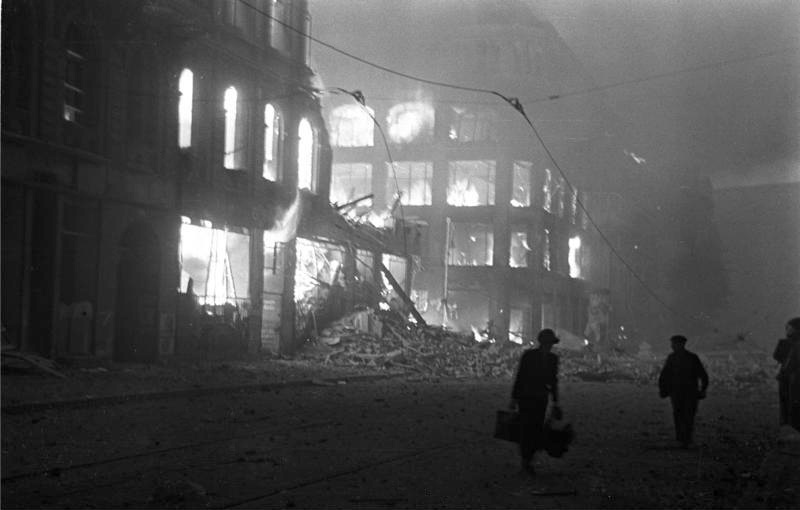
Berlin after air raids

Drossel found Marianne Hirschfeld in Berlin and they were married on 4 May 1946. They had a daughter Ruth. Antisemitism lingered after the war. Because his wife was Jewish, Drossel had difficulty establishing a law practice. He was a judge and then became head of the Courts Council, which makes decisions about hiring and promoting judges. He was a director of the social court in Berlin. He moved to Freiburg in 1975 and he became the director of Constance's Social Court. (Note: According to Constance's Social Court, "[t]he social court in Konstanz decides on matters of social security, basic security for those who are able to work, social assistance, social compensation law, the law on severely disabled persons and other areas of law.") He retired in 1981.

Drossel wrote the book Die Zeit der Fuechse (The Time of the Foxes) of his experiences and had it published in 1988.

External media

Audio
- Oral history interview with Heinz Drossel

Video
- Heinz Drossel, 2004 Wallenberg Lecture

He spoke to groups of people to them about the realities of the war, the nature and prevalence of antisemitism, and how to manage moral dilemmas. Drossel and his parents were awarded the title Righteous Among the Nations by Yad Vashem on 12 January 1999, and participated in a ceremony at the Israeli Embassy in Berlin for them in 2000. After receiving the award he said,

After I got the honor of Yad Vashem, I have spoken before more than 5,000 German young people in schools and high schools. It's necessary to give young people the courage to be human.

In 2001, he received the highest award available to civilians in Germany. On 19 October 2004 Drossel received the Wallenberg Medal, awarded to humanitarians. Drossel gave an oral history interview at the United States Holocaust Memorial Museum in 2007.

Drossel died on 28 April 2008 in Simonswald, Germany.

A biography of Drossel's life Bleib immer ein Mensch: Heinz Drossel, ein stiller Held 1916-2006 (Staying Human: The Story of a Quiet WWII Hero, English edition) was published by Katarina Stegelmann in 2013.
