= Béziers Cap d'Agde Airport =

Béziers Cap d'Agde Airport Aéroport Béziers Cap d'Agde
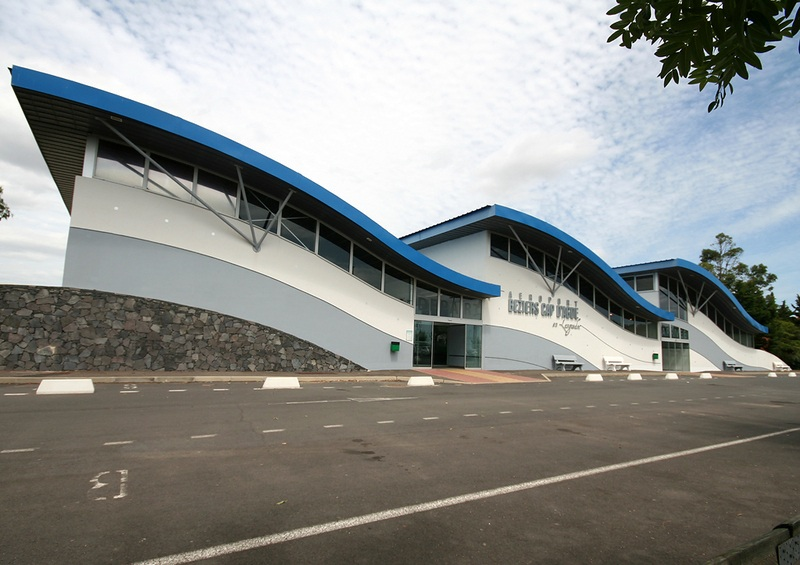
- IATA: BZR; ICAO: LFMU

Summary
- Airport type: Public
- Operator: CCI Béziers Saint-Pons
- Serves: Béziers
- Location: Vias, Hérault, France
- Elevation AMSL: 56 ft / 17 m
- Coordinates: 43°19′24″N 003°21′12″E
- Website: www.beziers.aeroport.fr

Map
- Location of airport in Occitanie region LFMU (France)

Runways
Direction	Length		Surface
Direction	m	ft	Surface
10/28	2,000	6,562	Asphalt

Statistics (2014)
- Passengers: 263,790
- Passenger Change 22-23: ▲20.0%
- Source: French AIP, UAF

Béziers Cap d'Agde Airport (French: Aéroport Béziers Cap d'Agde) (IATA: BZR, ICAO: LFMU) is an airport serving the town of Béziers and nearby Languedoc coastal resorts including Cap d'Agde. It is 11.5 km (6.2 NM) southeast of Béziers, near Vias in the Hérault department.

== History ==
Because of its comparatively short runway measuring 1,820 m × 30 m (5,971 ft × 98 ft), the airport was unable to benefit from the growth of low-cost flights that had fuelled expansion at other airports in the region (Carcassonne, Perpignan, Montpellier and Nîmes). For some years there were plans to extend the runway and this work was finally carried out between November 2006 and February 2007. The new runway is now capable of handling the Boeing 737-sized jets favoured by low-cost carriers. Facilities are limited, with departure capacity just capable to accommodate passengers for two Boeing 737s, using the two gates.

After a runway expansion completed in 2007, daily direct flights to Paris Orly and seasonal services to Bastia were augmented by Ryanair flights to and from Bristol International Airport, which commenced March 2008. On 24 March 2008, it was announced that during the summer months Ryanair flights would also operate to and from London Stansted with a possibility of being extended should they prove successful. Further flights from Béziers to London Luton Airport were announced in June 2008 and these commenced twice a week from October 2008.

== Facilities ==
The airport resides at an elevation of 56 feet (17 m) above mean sea level. It has one paved runway designated 09/27 with an asphalt surface measuring 2,000 by 45 metres (6,562 ft × 148 ft) The runway is equipped with ILS. Both local trains and TGV pass directly beside the terminal but do not stop as there is no airport station.

== Airlines and destinations ==
The following airlines operate regular scheduled and charter flights at Béziers Cap d'Agde Airport:

Airlines	Destinations
Ryanair	Charleroi; Seasonal: Bristol, Edinburgh, London–Luton, London–Stansted, Manchester, Shannon, Stockholm–Arlanda, Weeze
