= Sompop Jantraka =

Thai activist

Sompop Jantraka is a Thai activist dedicated to protecting children from exploitative labor and child trafficking.

After graduating with a bachelor's degree in political science from Chiang Mai University in 1988, Sompop began working as a researcher for the International Labour Organization. He also collaborated with a journalist to investigate trafficking issues in Thailand.

== Development and Education Programme for Daughters and Communities ==
In 1989, Sompop founded the "Daughters Education Programme (DEP)" to prevent girls from being forced into the sex industry, by funding their education. Working with a network of volunteers in villages in northern Thailand, DEP intervenes with girls and their families before they are sold to brothel owners, providing them with free vocational education so they can be self-reliant and economically independent.

In 1992, DEP became a part of a larger umbrella organization, Development and Education Programme for Daughters and Communities (DEPDC). DEPDC operates an emergency shelter for abused and abandoned children and for girls who have left prostitution. DEPDC also offers education programs and human rights training for indigenous people and undocumented migrants.

== Mekong Youth Net ==
Sompop resigned as director of DEPDC in 2007 to focus on anti-trafficking programmes throughout the Greater Mekong sub-region, including Laos, Vietnam, Burma, Cambodia, and Yunnan Province in China. Through the Mekong Youth Net, grassroots youth leaders have been brought together to provide relief and solutions to the exploitation of girls among the hill tribes and minority communities of the region.

== Honors and awards ==
- Ahmadiyya Muslim Prize for the Advancement of Peace (2026)
- Ashoka fellow, Public Broadcasting Service New Hero (2005).
- In March 2008, Sompop Jantraka was awarded the Wallenberg Medal by the University of Michigan.
- In 2015, he was the runner-up for the Robert Burns Humanitarian Award to Olivia Giles.
