= VIA Programs =

US-based non-profit organization

VIA (formerly Volunteers In Asia and Trans-Pacific Exchange) is an independent, non-sectarian, 501(c)(3) non-profit forming organization that is dedicated to increasing understanding between the United States and Asia. Based in the San Francisco Bay Area and founded in 1963, VIA specializes in provides two kinds of programs. VIA's Asia Programs offer Americans the chance to live and volunteer in Asia, while VIA's Stanford Programs enable East Asian university students the opportunity to participate in multi-week themed programs in the United States.

== History ==
VIA was established in 1963 during an era of radical social change in the United States. After two world wars and amidst the rising threat of Communism, many Americans in the 1960s looked to better acquaint themselves with the international community. During this time the Peace Corps was established with great success. It was also during this period that the US Congress established the East–West Center in Hawaii, an institution designed to strengthen relationships between Americans, Asians, and Pacific Islanders. Although much smaller than these organizations, VIA aimed to provide a range of educational and exchange opportunities to better connect Asians and Americans without governmental or religious affiliation.

In 1963, Dean of Freshmen Men at Stanford University Dwight Clark responded to student calls to better equip themselves for the future by organizing a group that visited Hong Kong that summer to engage in a variety of volunteer service projects. Thus began a yearly tradition of summer volunteering that was officially established in 1966 as Volunteers in Asia. In response to the Vietnam War, two-year positions were created for conscientious objectors seeking alternative service opportunities in Indonesia, Japan, the Philippines, Korea, Taiwan or Nepal.

By the end of the Vietnam War, Volunteers in Asia had firmly established summer programs for undergraduates and two-year programs for college graduates. The programs were expanded to include students from other Bay Area universities and then, in the late 1990s, nationwide recruitment was instituted. Over the years, volunteers have been placed in 15 Asian countries, including Bangladesh, China, Hong Kong, Indonesia, Japan, Korea, Laos, Macau, Myanmar, Nepal, Philippines, Sri Lanka, Taiwan, Thailand, and Vietnam.

In the 1970s, VIA added to its offerings by establishing programs designed to expose Asian students to American culture. Originally operating under the name Trans-Pacific Exchange, these opportunities are now called VIA Stanford Programs. The longest-running of these is the American Language and Culture program, which hosts over 150 students each summer. Participants have come from Japan, Taiwan, Singapore, South Korea and Mainland China. VIA Stanford Programs have taken a variety of themes, but they all strive to give participants the linguistic and cultural skills to excel as global citizens.

== Connection with Stanford University ==
Throughout its history, VIA has had logistical and cooperative ties with Stanford University in California. Although never a university program, VIA began as a Stanford student project and for its first years was only available to Stanford University students. For over four decades, VIA's home office was located on Stanford's campus. Although VIA's main office moved to San Francisco in 2006, VIA continues to use Stanford facilities to host its Stanford Programs, recruits participants from Stanford's student body and maintains a satellite office on campus. Nonetheless, VIA has always and continues to operate as an entirely independent entity.

== Confusion about name ==
Whereas the core programs and mission of VIA have not changed, there is often confusion about the name of the organization, currently in its 5th decade.

Name	Notes	Dates Used
Volunteers in Asia	Original name of the organization, and still its legal, 501(c)(3) name	Mid-1960s to Late 70s.
Volunteers in Asia and Trans-Pacific Exchange	Trans-Pacific Exchange (TPE) was added in the mid-1970s to represent the programs bringing Asian college students to the U.S.	Mid-1970s to 2000.
VIA (pronounced VEE-uh)	Used as a nickname since the 1960s, became the name used by the organization publicly in 2000.	2000 to present.
VIA Programs	Used only to differentiate from other VIAs. Used specifically as Web address: www.viaprograms.org	Since mid-1990s.

== Current programs ==
For US residents, VIA continues to offer one- and two-year volunteer opportunities in Asia. Countries include Cambodia, People's Republic of China, Indonesia, Laos, Myanmar, Thailand and Vietnam. In addition, summer cultural immersion programs are offered in China, Indonesia and Vietnam. Additionally, Stanford students can participate in VIA's Stanford Programs as hosts or student coordinators. VIA offers six fellowships, two CJ Huang fellowships for Stanford students interested in service in China and four Vietnam Community fellowships for students interested in social work in Vietnam.

For residents of Japan, Taiwan, South Korea and Mainland China, VIA Stanford Programs offers the following opportunities in the spring: Exploring Health Care and Serving American Community. Summer programs include: American Language and Culture, Exploring Social Innovation, and Asia-US Service Learning.

== See also ==
- List of non-governmental organizations in the People's Republic of China
- List of non-governmental organizations in Vietnam
- List of social and non-governmental organisations in Myanmar
- List of non-governmental organizations in Thailand
