= Eastern Caribbean-Southeast Asia Chamber =

- Formation: 2017; 9 years ago
- Type: Non-Governmental Organization
- Diplomatic Affairs Envoy and Executive Director: Matthew Pajares Yngson
- Website: ecseachamber.org

Eastern Caribbean-Southeast Asia Economic and Cultural Chamber is an international non-governmental organization founded in 2017. It is an entity in accordance with the European Convention on the Recognition of the Legal Personality of International Non-Governmental Organisations.

The goal of the Chamber is to progress economic and cultural exchange of the independent island nations in the Eastern Caribbean that are part of the Organisation of Eastern Caribbean States and the wider Caribbean region. The Chamber promotes and pushes relations of these small countries to Southeast Asia which is the fastest economically progressing region in the world according to the World Economic Forum.

== Recognition ==
The Chamber is recognized by the United Nations as a participant to the United Nations Global Compact and a partner of the SIDS Global Business Network under the United Nations Office of the High Representative for the Least Developed Countries, Landlocked Developing Countries and Small Island Developing States.

It has been formally granted special accreditation by the United Nations General Assembly as an observer to the International Conference on Small Island Developing States, the High-Level Summit of the Future, the Ocean Conference, and the Conference on Landlocked Developing Countries.

The Chamber is a member of the Conference of NGOs in Consultative Relationship with the United Nations and is registered on the European Union's Transparency Register. It is also recorded by the Union of International Associations.

== Activities ==
It works with governments, private sector, and the academe to achieve common objectives.

The Chamber is the official secretariat of the Caribbean ASEAN Council.

It is also the learning provider and registrar of the Asia Caribbean Open Institute.
