= Thai Children's Trust =

UK-based children's charity

Logo of the Thai Children's Trust

The Thai Children's Trust, formerly Pattaya Orphanage Trust, is a registered charitable organization in the United Kingdom (No. 1085407) which supports vulnerable and disadvantaged children in Thailand. It helps fund projects for orphans, refugee children, HIV positive children and children with AIDS, homeless children, tsunami orphans and children and young people with disabilities. The Trust has recently helped support the Teacher Preparation Center, a training school for mobile teacher trainers, in Mae Sot. The TPC trains trainers who work in the Eastern states of Burma/Myanmar, trying to restore and improve educational standards in areas ravaged by years of civil war. The Trust has also found some funding for villageONE, a project combining education and community development which hopes to start work in Mon State, Burma/Myanmar, later this year.

They are reportedly the largest UK charity focusing on Thailand. They send over £700,000 to Thailand's most vulnerable children, providing a safe and loving home, which includes daily necessities like food, shelter, medical care and education for over 1500 children.

== History ==
The Pattaya Orphanage Trust was founded in 1982 by Baron Riccardo Carini. Originally, it supported the Pattaya Orphanage which was founded by Father Ray Brennan, an American Redemptorist priest, in 1972. Today, the Thai Children's Trust supports over thirty projects across Thailand. Since 2009, the Trust has been under the patronage of Vincent Nichols, the Archbishop of Westminster.

== Operations ==
The charity focuses on disadvantaged and vulnerable children across Thailand. Projects it supports provide full care, including accommodation, education and medical care to over a thousand children. It also supports health, education and nutrition projects which help over 3000 children.

The charity supports a range of projects across Thailand run by its partner organisations, which include the Father Ray Foundation, Baan Than Namchai Orphanage, Sarnelli House Thailand, The Good Shepherd Sisters, and the Pattaya Orphanage.

The Thai Children's Trust does not open projects of its own. It is their policy to always operate through local organisation. They believe that in this way, the donation could bring double benefit. They could build local expertise, train local managers and staff whilst still supporting the children who are the main focus.

The Trust concentrates its effort on four main areas: Children at Risk, Children with Disability, Children with HIV and Child Refugees. Under "Children at Risk", the projects to care for the children are further classified into children who are orphaned and abandoned, victims of the tsunami, street children and victims of child trafficking.

The trust has worked closely with the Catholic Church in Thailand to support projects managed or supported by Catholic religious orders, such as the Redemptorists, the Camillians and the Sisters of the Good Shepherd. The trust is also endorsed by Burmese Nobel Peace Prize winner Aung San Suu Kyi for their work with Burmese refugee children in camps on the Thai border. In a letter read out at Westminster Abbey on 4 October 2011, she says: "The fate of migrant and refugee children is of particular concern; in addition to the deprivations they suffer they are often not certain if there is any part of the world they can call their own… Any effort to make the lives of such children healthier, happier or more secure is a truly worthwhile project." Some of the projects that the Thai Children's Trust supports on the Thai-Burma border are the Mae Tao Clinic, and the Room to Grow Foundation which provides meals for nearly 1000 refugee children on a daily basis.

The Trust chooses carefully which projects and organisations in Thailand to support. They stay closely involved with their partners, who operate on the ground and know precisely what the children need. By being involved, the trust can keep track of both the children's needs and the support that they would be able to offer. By having such a direct link to the children they care for, the Trust can see clearly where the money goes.

== Activities ==
Sponsor a child

The Thai Children's Trust runs a program for donors around the world to contribute £18 a month to sponsor a child at one of the residential programs it supports. There is also an opportunity to sponsor meals for Burmese migrant children, more than half of whom are clinically malnourished. The money collected from the sponsorship is meant for the lodging, education and food for the children. Some of the beneficiaries include Street children in Thailand who lead a life of poverty, living in slums or sleeping on the street, and are often exposed to dangers. The home provides a safe haven for the vulnerable children and a reliable way back into their life.

Besides through their own website, the Trust also uses other social media channels like Facebook and Twitter to create public awareness.

== Website ==
- Thai Children's Trust official website
- Thai Children's Trust Blog
