= Safa Al Ahmad =

Saudi Arabian journalist and filmmaker

- Occupations: Filmmaker, journalist
- Years active: 2010–present

Safa al-Ahmad (Arabic: صفاء الأحمد) is a Saudi Arabian journalist and filmmaker. She directed documentaries for PBS and the BBC focusing on uprisings in the Middle East. On November 19, 2019, she was awarded the Wallenberg Medal at the University of Michigan. She was the joint winner of the 2015 Index on Censorship Freedom of Expression Award for Journalism and was a finalist for the 2014 Sony Impact Award.

== Career ==
Safa started her career in field of documentary film-making. She rose to international fame when she participated on BBC Arabic by directing many documentaries since 2012 to date.
