= System area network =

Networks for cluster computing

System area networks (SAN) are high-performance, connection-oriented networks that link computer clusters. Microsoft SQL Server 2005 uses it for high-performance connectivity through Virtual Interface Adapter (VIA). This technology is used since the advent of Windows 2000.

== See also ==
- Storage area network
- Virtual Interface Adapter
