= Development and Education Programme for Daughters and Communities =

Thai nongovernmental organization

The Development and Education Programme for Daughters and Communities (DEPDC) is a non-profit, community-based NGO working in Thailand to prevent child exploitation and prostitution and defend the rights of minors. The DEP, later the DEPDC, was founded in 1988 by Sampop Jantraka, as a response to the practice of selling young children into the sex industry. Women and children of Thai nationality are being increasingly victimized, but additionally and especially vulnerable to this type of exploitation are children of refugee, or "stateless", status, who have no citizenship and therefore no access to education, health care or legitimate work opportunities. DEPDC offers free education, vocational training, and full-time accommodation for young girls and boys, and helps combat human trafficking in the Mekong sub-region.

== History ==
DEPDC started in 1989 by helping nineteen girls, founded as the Daughters Education Program, their program has now expanded to helping over 400 girls find alternatives to entering the sex trade. DEPDC works with community leaders to identify which girls are going to be at a higher level of risk to enter the sex trade, they then work with the family to gain their trust and support. Gaining the family's trust and support is crucial to the success of the girls; however, they program does offer alternative living arrangements for girls that are not allowed to stay with their family.

Sompop Jantraka, a winner of the Wallenberg Medal, grew up impoverished in southern Thailand. In 1988, while working to identify why women and children went into prostitution, he decided that working to eliminate this epidemic was to be his life goal. He used the money that he earned as a researcher to pay families of girls that would have otherwise been sent to a life of sexual slavery, but instead were allowed to stay home and obtain their education.

== Mission ==
The DEPDC's mission is to "aim to instil self-confidence and positive attitudes among the children as well as improve the material, social, and spiritual quality of life for these children and their communities."

== Projects ==
- Half Day School: Based in Mae Sai, this project provides basic education and vocational training to the vulnerable children in the surrounding area so that they are less likely to end up in exploitative situations.
- Mekong Regional Indigenous Child Rights Home (MRICRH): Based in Mae Chan, this project provides accommodation, swimming lessons, and enrolment in the local school as well as basic English lessons for indigenous and at risk children.
- Sustainable Agricultural Skills Training: As part of their vocational training, children in all DEPDC shelters are thought to be self-sufficient through agricultural activities such as the planting, growing, and harvesting of crops.

== Donors ==
The projects are sponsored and supported by the ILO, UNICEF, USAID, Oxfam Netherlands and others. In addition, The Thailand Project: Higher Education as Humanitarian Aid proposes to partner non-governmental organizations with American universities with the goal of offering educational opportunities to stateless young women like those who attended DEPDC in order to give these individuals the tools to return to their home country and work to combat the conditions that cause child exploitation and prostitution.
