= Cbj (publisher) =

German publisher of children's literature

cbj
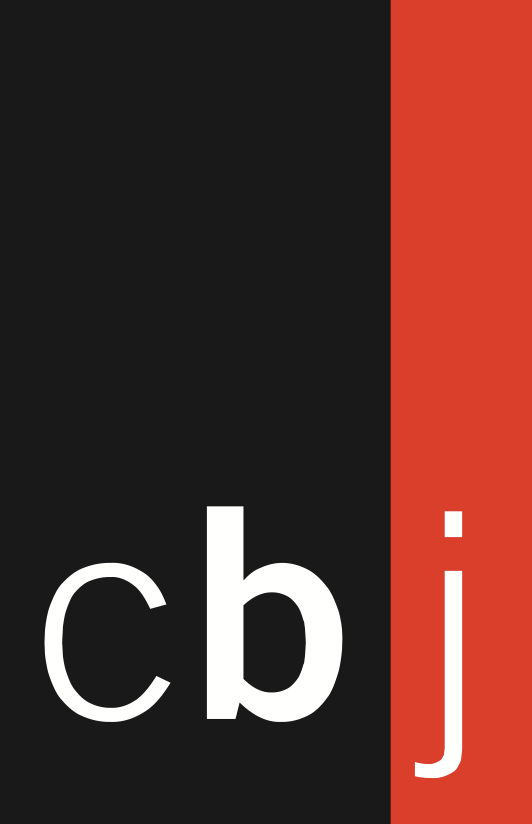
- Parent company: Penguin Random House
- Founded: 1968
- Founder: Jürgen Weidenbach
- Country of origin: Germany
- Headquarters location: Munich
- Fiction genres: children's literature
- Official website: cbj

cbj is a German publisher of children's literature based in Munich. It was founded in 1968 under the name "C. Bertelsmann Jugendbuchverlag" (C. Bertelsmann Youth book publishing) and is still an independent part of the Random House Publishing Group. cbj publishes works by German and international authors. The publisher was made known by the book series "The Famous Five" by Enid Blyton, among others. In 2008, a part of the program was redistributed in the newly founded cbt publishing.

== History ==
The history of cbj dates back to the 19th century. In 1835, Carl Bertelsmann founded C. Bertelsmann Publishing, the whose program also included children's books. In 1861, 1869 and most recently in 1955, parts of the Liesching publishing from Stuttgart was taken over. Allowing the youth book program to grow. Youth books were later made one of five divisions of C. Bertelsmann Publishing. As the Bertelsmann Concerns Publishing merged into the Bertelsmann Publishing Group in 1968, for children's literature the C. Bertelsmann Youth book Publishing was founded. In the early 1970s, the C. Bertelsmann Youth book Publishing published moved from Gütersloh to Munich, as with the other trade publishers of Bertelsmann. In 1995, it launched, under the name "omnibus", a commercially successful series of paperbacks. In 2004, C. Bertelsmann Youth book Publishing was renamed cbj, so that it would not be confused with C. Bertelsmann Publisher. Pocket books for children appeared further under the name "omnibus" and paperbacks for young people under "cbt".

At the same time, the program of the publishing house was expanded in scope, while they had previously published mainly books for the age groups of 10 or 12 years, titles for younger readers were also put out. Under the direction of Jürgen Weidenbach, publishing sales grew strong the next four years. Since 2008, cbj and cbt are two independent publishers with their own hardcover and paperback programs. In the course, the "omnibus" brand was discontinued, and diverse titles were added in the programs from cbj and cbt. In 2009, cbj audio was started for audiobooks of children's literature, which was formally offered under the name "audionauten". Since the renaming, cbj audio functions as an independent publisher under the Random House Publishing Group, but is organizationally assigned to Random House Audio. In August 2014, Nicola Bartels took over editorial responsibilities for cbj and cbt, publishing director is still Jürgen Weidenbach.

== Program ==
Today cbj publishes a wide range of literature from children's book through to youth books for readers aged 3 to 14 years and "All Age " titles. The publisher offers both paperbacks and hardcover. Content included in the program are in the areas of hardcover picture books, illustrated children's books, read-aloud stories and children’s novels, and also fantastic socio-critical scenarios for teenagers. Additionally, cbj also offers nonfiction. The publisher also offers a few apps.

Among the authors from cbj include German writers such as Ingo Siegner, Julian Press, Patricia Schröder, Usch Luhn and Ute Krause. Additionally, cbj publishes German-language editions from international authors, including Christopher Paolini ( "Eragon"), Jonathan Stroud ( "Bartimaeus"), Markus Zusak ( "The Book Thief"), Michael Scott ("The Secrets of the Immortal Nicholas Flamel") and Tony DiTerlizzi ( "the Spiderwick Chronicles"). Furthermore, is the publishing of book series such as "Der kleine Drache Kokosnuss " (Ingo Siegner), "Five Friends" (Enid Blyton) or "Nele" (Usch Luhn). In collaboration with GEOlino, classical children's literature is published under the name "GEOlino library", including "The Jungle Book" or "Treasure Island" (Robert Louis Stevenson). As of September 2005 over 380,000 copies were sold.

Overall, there are currently more than 1,400 titles available.

=== Reading Promotion ===
In the 1990s, the C. Bertelsmann Youth Publishing initiated the campaign "Ich schenk Dir eine Geschichte", which is carried out within the framework of the World Book Day. In recent years, the publisher has reached through this, multiple runs of over a million copies, most recently, in 2015 with "Die Krokodilbande in geheimer Mission" by Dirk Ahner. Additionally, cbj is a member of Arbeitsgemeinschaft von Jugendbuchverlagen ajv (Association of Youth book publishers). The avj represents the interests of the publishing industry and promotes projects and awards in the field of children's literature.
