= European Convention on the Recognition of the Legal Personality of International Non-Governmental Organisations =

International treaty

The European Convention on the Recognition of the Legal Personality of International Non-Governmental Organisations is an international treaty that sets the legal basis for the existence and work of international non-governmental organizations in Europe. It was adopted by the member states of the Council of Europe, meeting at Strasbourg on 24 April 1986. It entered into force on 1 January 1991; signatory states were Austria, Belgium, France, Greece, Portugal, Slovenia, Switzerland and the United Kingdom.

As of 31 May 2018, the treaty has been ratified by Austria, Belgium, Cyprus, France, Greece, Liechtenstein, North Macedonia, Netherlands, Portugal, Slovenia, Switzerland, and the United Kingdom, and has been extended by the UK to Guernsey, Jersey, and the Isle of Man.

== See also ==
- Legal personality
