= Starfish Country Home School Foundation =

Starfish Education Foundation
- Founded: March 2005
- Purpose: Improving access to quality education for children in Thailand and beyond
- Headquarters: 278 Moo 10 T. Inthakhin, Amphoe Mae Taeng, Thailand 50150
- Origins: Chiang Mai, Thailand
- Region served: Thailand
- Employees: 85
- Website: http://www.starfishedu.org

Starfish Education Foundation, formerly named Starfish Country Home School Foundation, was registered as a non-profit organization in Thailand in March 2005. The foundation’s principal offices are located in Mae Taeng District, about 45 km (27 miles) north of Chiang Mai Province in northern Thailand.

The use of Starfish in the name of Starfish Education Foundation originates from the famous parable of Loren Eisley, The Star Thrower. That story reflects Starfish Education Foundation's philosophy of trying to give significant assistance to a relatively less important beneficiaries so as to have a large impact on their lives.

Starfish Education Foundation is not affiliated with any religious or political organization.

== Starfish School ==
In April 2005, Starfish Education Foundation completed purchase of the site of a former resort on the Ping River and remodeled this for use as a home and free bilingual school for needy ethnic minority children. Starfish School opened in June 2005 with 10 students. It was registered with the Thailand Education Ministry as a kindergarten (anubaan) in 2006 and as a primary school (prathom) in 2008. Teaching is in a combination of English and Thai. The school uses a curriculum that it calls Thaiglish to teach English. Thaiglish is a picture-based curriculum that uses a combination of Thai and English script to more accurately represent the sound of American English words. The school has also developed its own curriculum for teaching mathematics. Most of the primary school students at the Starfish School study Western ballet, jazz and Thai classical dancing.
