= Khek Noi =

Coordinates: 16.8118°N 100.9671°E

Khek Noi เข็กน้อย
- Tambon
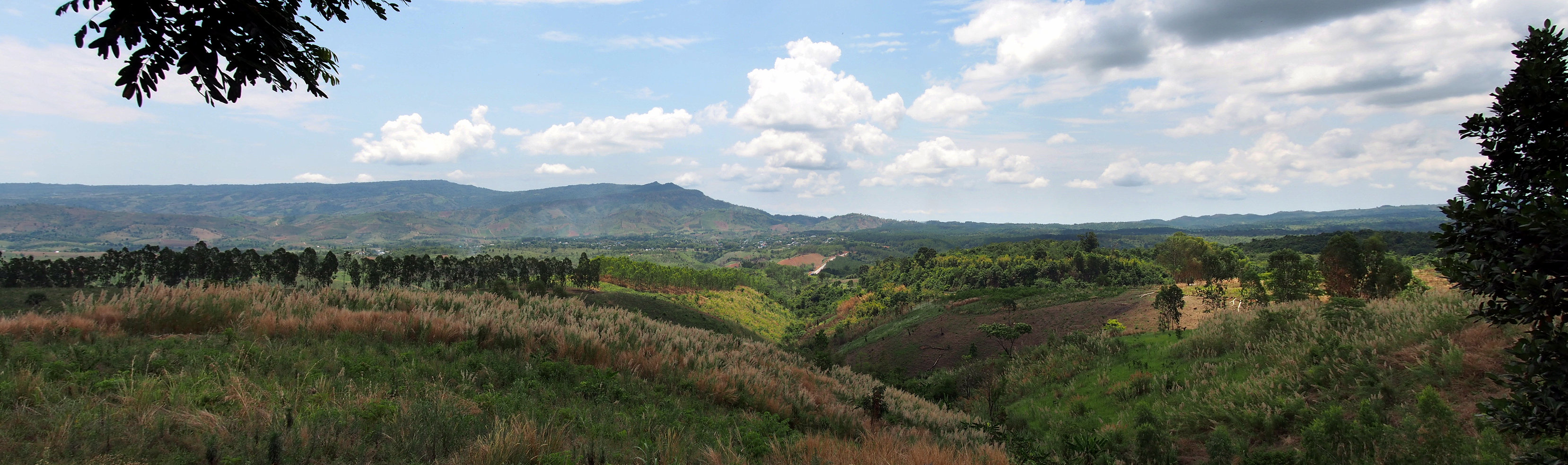
- The village of Khek Noi in the Phetchabun Mountains
- Interactive map of Khek Noi
- Country: Thailand
- Province: Phetchabun
- Amphoe: Khao Kho

Population (2017)
  - Total: 15,382
- Time zone: UTC+7 (TST)
- Postal code: 67280
- TIS 1099: 671107

Khek Noi (Thai: เข็กน้อย, pronounced [kʰèk nɔ́ːj]) is a tambon (subdistrict) of Khao Kho District, in Phetchabun Province, Thailand. In 2017 it had a total population of 15,382 people.

== History ==
The subdistrict was created effective August 10, 1989 by splitting off 6 administrative villages from Khaem Son.

== Administration ==
=== Central administration ===
The tambon is subdivided into 12 administrative villages (muban).

No.	Name	Thai
1.	Ban Huai Ban Khao	บ้านห้วยบ้านขาว
2.	Ban Khek Noi	บ้านเข็กน้อย
3.	Ban Pa Kluai	บ้านป่ากล้วย
4.	Ban Khek Noi	บ้านเข็กน้อย
5.	Ban Lao Lue Kao	บ้านเล่าลือเก่า
6.	Ban Pak Thang	บ้านปากทาง
7.	Ban Sak Charoen	บ้านศักดิ์เจริญ
8.	Ban Chai Chana	บ้านชัยชนะ
9.	Ban Prakop Suk	บ้านประกอบสุข
10.	Ban Charoen Phatthana	บ้านเจริญพัฒนา
11.	Ban Khiri Rat	บ้านคีรีรัตน์
12.	Ban Santi Suk	บ้านสันติสุข

=== Local administration ===
The whole area of the subdistrict is covered by the subdistrict administrative organization (SAO) Khek Noi (องค์การบริหารส่วนตำบลเข็กน้อย).
