= Plant A Tree Today Foundation =

Non-governmental environmental organization

Plant A Tree Today Foundation (PATT)
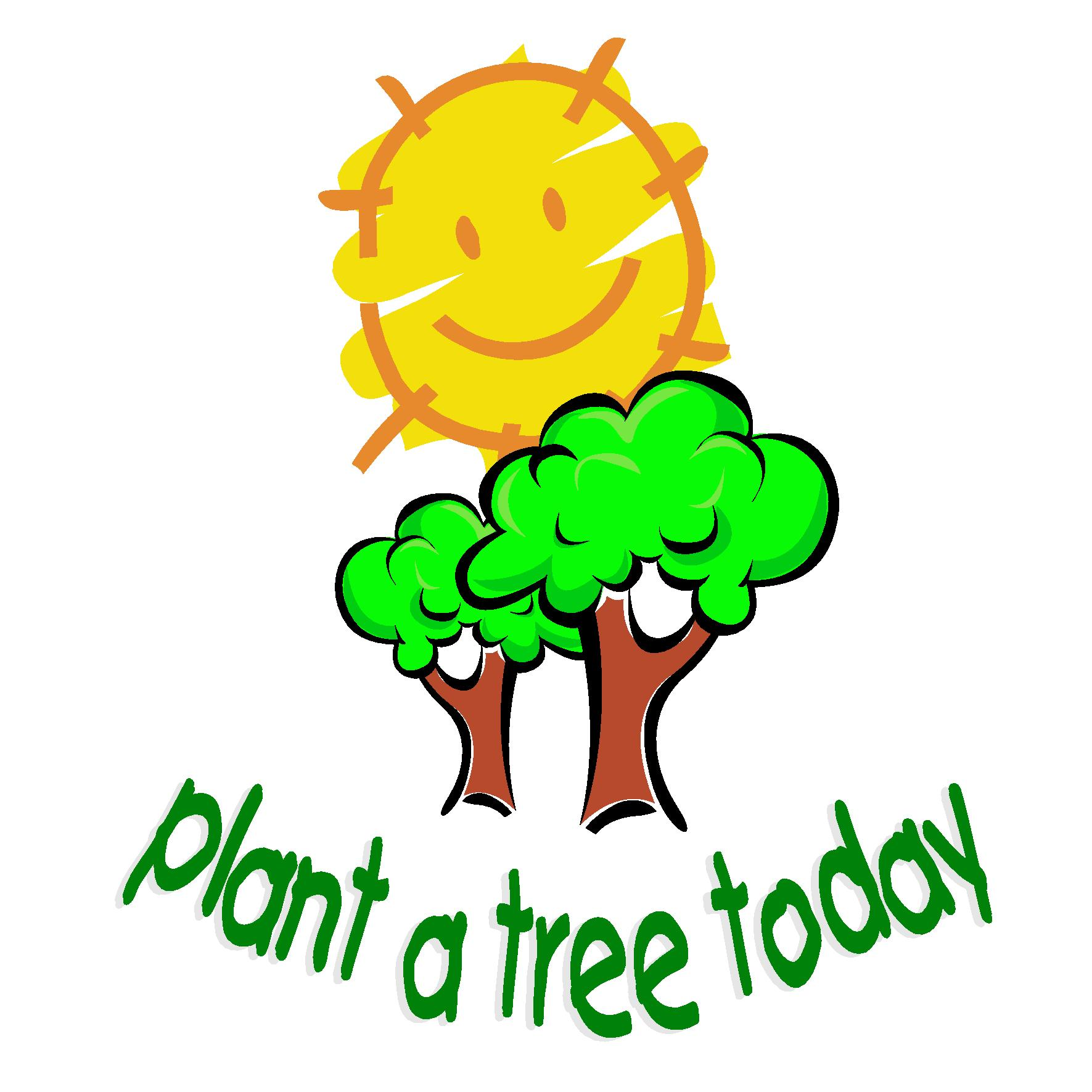
- Founded: 2 November 2005
- Founder: Andrew Steel
- Type: UK Registered Charity; Thai Foundation
- Purpose: Environment, Climate Change, Ending poverty
- Location(s): Offices and operations in Thailand, Indonesia, Malaysia, India, South Africa
- Region served: Global
- Method: Donations and Grants
- Website: pattfoundation.org

The Plant A Tree Today Foundation (PATT) is a non-governmental environmental organization with primary operations in the United Kingdom and Thailand. Established in 2005, PATT attempts to raise environmental awareness and foster better practices in less developed nations around the world, planting trees as a means to combat deforestation and climate change. Planting tree help to reforest cleared land. Planting of trees also plays a role in climate change adaptation.

== Organisational history ==
=== Establishment and purpose ===
The Plant A Tree Today Foundation or the P.A.T.T., was organised in November 2005 by Andrew Steel, who established the organization as a means of combating ongoing deforestation in less-developed nations around the world through public education and tree-planting campaigns. The group is a registered charitable organisation in the United Kingdom since 2006.

Shortly after its launch, PATT began to work with UK fundraising consultant The Midas Partnership, which assisted in the generation of the initial capitalisation of the group. Fundraising activities were conducted both in the UK and in Thailand, a nation of primary concern to the organisation.

It is also a registered foundation in Thailand. Steel remains a Director of the foundation, assisted by Charlotte Whalley.

PATT works to raise awareness of global environmental issues, campaign for better environmental practices and take action against deforestation and climate change by planting trees. It implements tree planting projects and carbon offsetting with environmentally conscious businesses, provides environmental education to schools in developing countries, and funds community development projects in rural communities centered on tree planting and reforestation.

Reforestation projects sponsored by PATT attempt to generate broad participation among the affected communities. For example, a 2008 reforestation project in Phetchaburi, Thailand, brought together schoolchildren, monks, governmental officers, and local villagers with forestation staff in planting over 2500 trees. Native tree species were replanted in a forest degraded by selective logging in an effort to restore animal habitat. The restored lowland deciduous tropical forest was to be used in the future as a tool for future environmental education.

=== Carbon Bank and Village Development Project ===
In 2009 the Carbon Bank and Village Development Project sponsored by PATT was awarded a 2009 United Nations-backed SEED Award. The SEED Initiative, founded by the United Nations Environmental Programme, the United Nations Development Programme and the International Union for the Conservation of Nature, identifies and supports promising locally oriented enterprises in developing countries which are working to improve livelihoods and manage natural resources sustainably.

The group's Carbon Bank and Village Development Project targeted 48 rural villages in Thailand, helping to establish community forests and a micro-finance system in each, managed by the local communities themselves. Ultimately it is hoped that degraded land in these communities will be reforested and climate change lessened through the project, while at the same time village economies are enhanced.

=== UK Educational Programme ===
In 2012, PATT launched a programme to join with almost 600 primary schools in the UK to provide educational materials, including online lesson plans and activities to be downloaded by teachers and used in classes. The educational materials are linked with the national curriculum, allowing the future generation to become aware of climate change and the problems which come with global warming.

The programme includes an intranet site for students and teachers to communicate and view lesson plans, as well as being able to interact with others in the programme. Facts are supported by resources, such as live webcam and video sessions from the wildlife from the middle of the forests, showing the reforestation projects being carried out by PATT. Maps are also available to pinpoint on-going and future projects.

== Programs ==
The Plant A Tree Today Foundation operates a number of projects across the globe:

Thailand

- Khao Yai National Park - Forest restoration
- Phra Pradaeng - Urban community forest restoration
- Bang Pu - Mangrove restoration
- Doi Mae Salong - Agro-forestry, habitat restoration, sustainable development
- Ban Nong Muang - Carbon offset, reforestation, and sustainable development
- Bangkok - School Tree Nurseries
- Bangkok - EcoKids environmental education
- Phetchaburi- Wildlife habitat restoration
- Doi Suthep-Pui National Park - Forest restoration and research
- Ratchaburi - Community forestry
- Khao Takiab - Mangrove forest restoration
- Ban Non Tong, - Carbon offset, reforestation, and sustainable development
- Chiang Rai - Jatropha Biodiesel and Village Development

Indonesia

- Tabanan, Bali - Habitat restoration
- Pramuka Island, Jakarta Bay - Mangrove forest restoration
- Sideman, Bali - Matthew Faid Forest, Trees for Life
- Lombok - Agro-forestry

India

- Chennai - Reforestation
- Mumbai - Corporate social responsibility

South Africa

- Table Mountain - Threatened species preservation

Malaysia

- North Selangor - Peat Swamp forest reserve restoration

The organisation states that it intends to plant 1 million trees in Thailand in 2011.

== Timeline ==
- 2 November 2005 - The PATT Foundation officially formed
- 7 December 2006 - PATT becomes a Registered Charitable Foundation in the United Kingdom
- 2006 - Installation of Thailand School Tree Nurseries
- June 2007 - Carbon Free Development Village Development projects started in Thailand
- 9 April 2008 - Projects begin in Indonesia at Sideman Village, Bali, and planting begins for the Matthew Faid Memorial Forest
- 11 July 2008 - PATT becomes a Registered Foundation in Thailand
- October 2008 - Projects begin in India with a collaboration between PATT and the SAGE Foundation. First project on behalf of Standard Chartered Bank conducted at INS Trata in Worli.
- December 2008 - Thailand Eco Kids camps begin
- 22 April 2009 - Projects begin in South Africa in conjunction with World Environment Day.
- 12 May 2009 - United Nations SEED Award.
- The Founder of the PATT Foundation, Andrew Steel was awarded an honorary doctorate in recognition of his environmental commitment and charitable work in July 2012 by the University of Hull.
- November 2012 - UK Primary Schools Programme launched.
