= Via (surname) =

Via is a surname. Notable people with the surname include:

- Angela Via (fl. 2000–2006), American singer
- Chris Via (born 1992), American ten-pin bowler
- Dennis L. Via (born c. 1958), US Army general
- Elizabeth Jane Via (born 1947), American lawyer and womanpriest
