= Vias station =

Railway station in France

Vias
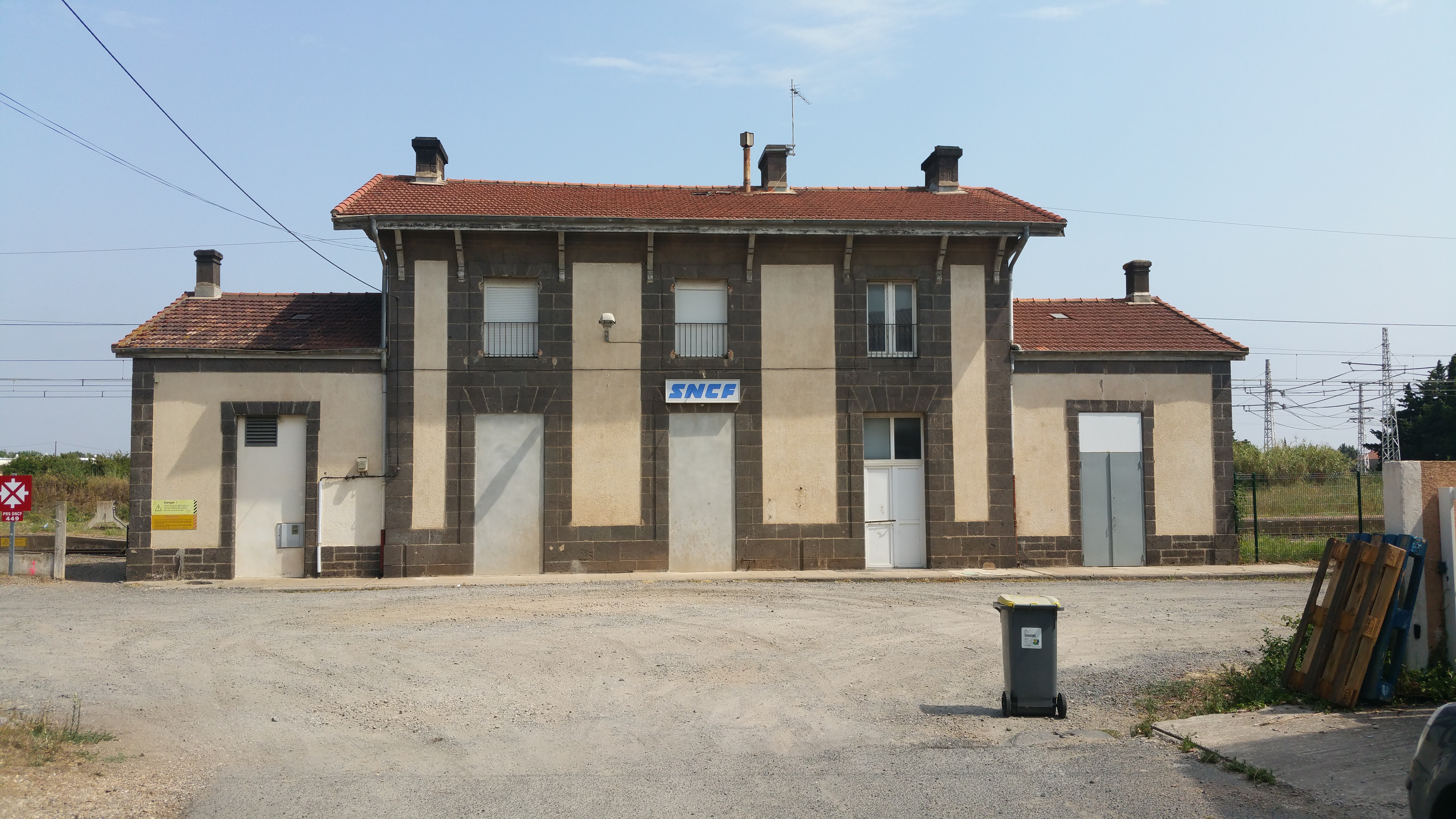
- Vias Station

General information
- Location: Vias, Occitanie, France
- Coordinates: 43.31576°N 3.42537°E
- Line: Bordeaux–Sète railway

Other information
- Station code: 87781260

History
- Opened: 1857

Services
Preceding station	TER Occitanie	Following station
Béziers towards Narbonne	21	Agde towards Avignon-Centre
Location

Vias is a railway station in Vias, Occitanie, southern France. Within TER Occitanie, it is part of line 21 (Narbonne–Avignon).
