= Baan Unrak =

Baan Unrak is a non-profit humanitarian organization that supports children and single mothers in Sangkhla Buri, Kanchanaburi Province, Thailand. It incorporates the Baan Unrak Children’s home, Primary School, and community development projects such as a weaving center where single mothers make handicrafts and earn a fair wage.

== Baan Unrak Children's Home ==
The children's home was founded in 1991 as a home for orphans and destitute children. It is currently home to over 140 children, as well as several single mothers. All of the mothers and 80% of the children at Baan Unrak are refugees from Myanmar (or Burma) which borders the district.

The children are taught to lead a vegetarian lifestyle and practice meditation and yoga regularly. Besides receiving an education, they are engaged in various holistic activities such as gardening, art, music and dance.

== Baan Unrak Primary School ==
The primary school was opened in 2005 and is a fully accredited school in Thailand. It was created to provide an education for children that face significant barriers attending Thai government schools. Many of the children are immigrants from Burma, and several are many years behind the normal grade level for their age. The school specializes in offering a holistic education, teaching through stories, plays, traditional dance and various activities.

== Women’s Weaving Center ==
Baan Unrak offers support services to single mothers who are struggling to provide for their children. Mothers are able to stay at the children’s home with their children and work in the weaving center where they earn a fair wage and can save for the future. The handicrafts are sold at one of the three Baan Unrak clothing stores located in Sangkhlaburi.

== Community Relief ==
Teenagers living at the children’s home are in charge of the community relief project to distribute rice, milk and blankets to remote villages in the Sangkhlaburi region. For households without an able-bodied man, the teenagers rebuild their roof-tops before the rainy season.

== Animal Rescue Centre ==
Run by Gemma Ashford, UK actress and social photographer - Gemma Ashford Photography, the Baan Unrak Animal Sanctuary*, was established to control and care for the large feral dog population in Sangkhlaburi and environs. It is sponsored by private donation support and the following the organisations, the Worldwide Veterinary Service, The Humane Society and Lush cosmetics.
