= Cbt (publisher) =

German publisher of children's literature

cbt
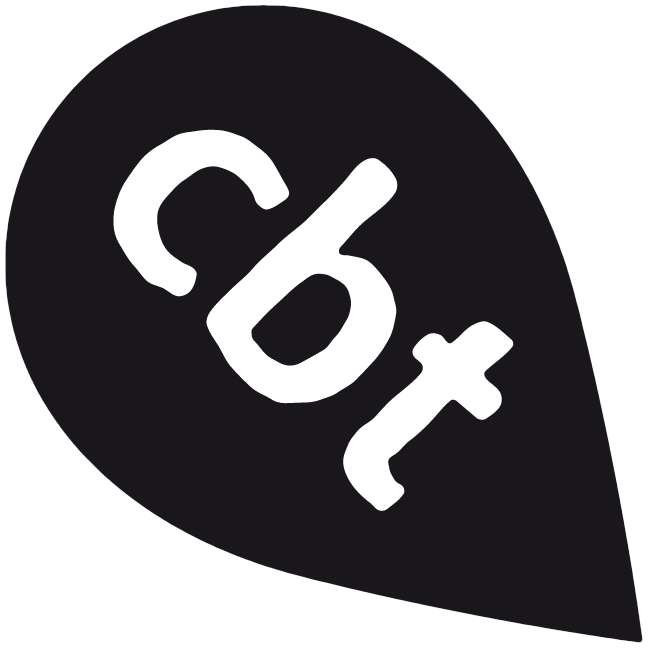
- Parent company: Random House
- Founded: 2008
- Country of origin: Germany
- Headquarters location: Munich
- Fiction genres: children's literature
- Official website: www.randomhouse.de/cbt/

cbt is a German publisher of children's literature based in Munich. It is part of the Random House publishing group.

== History ==
In 2001, the publisher cbj began publishing paperback under the cbt brand name. In 2008, the program was extended to hardcover copies, and cbt upgraded into an independent publishing house within the Random House publishing group. Therefore, both cbj and cbt both possessed a paperback and hardcover program. Reasons for the reorganization of the publisher were stated to be the large demand in the area of books for young people. Cbt first focused on adolescents, starting from 13-years of age. In 2014, they extended their audience to readers from 9 to 16 years of age. Additionally, the brand identity of the publisher was revised. In August 2014, Nicola Bartels took over publishing responsibilities for cbj and cbt, the publishing director is still to this date, Jürgen Weidenbach.

== Program ==
Among the authors of cbt include German writers such as Christine Fehér, Elisabeth Herrmann, Friedrich Ani, Nina Blazon and Wulf Dorn. In addition, cbt publishes German-language editions from international authors such as, Jay Asher (Dead Girls don't Lie), Lauren Kate (Angel), Robert Muchamore (CHERUB) and Veronica Roth (Determination). Some published paperbacks of cbt include those from authors such as David Levithan, Lisa J. Smith, Rachel Cohn, Sara Shepard and Simone Elkeles. Also included in the cbt program are the all-age titles, such as Monika Feth with Die Erdbeerpflücker.
