= Wallenberg Medal =

- Description: Award honoring outstanding humanitarians whose actions reflect the commitment and sacrifice of Raoul Wallenberg
- Country: United States
- Presented by: University of Michigan

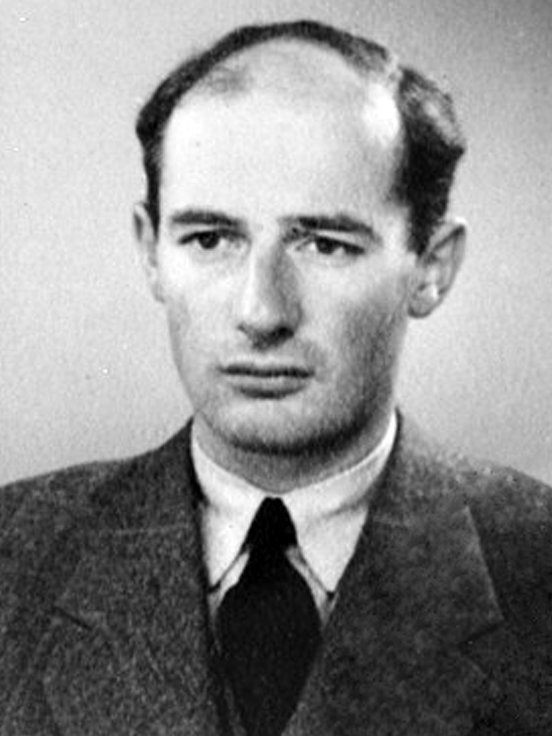
Raoul Wallenberg in 1944

The Wallenberg Medal of the University of Michigan is awarded to outstanding humanitarians whose actions on behalf of the defenseless and oppressed reflect the heroic commitment and sacrifice of Raoul Wallenberg, the Swedish diplomat who rescued tens of thousands of Jews in Budapest during the closing months of World War II.

== Raoul Wallenberg at the University of Michigan ==
Encouraged by his grandfather, Gustaf Wallenberg, a diplomat and member of a prominent Swedish family of bankers, industrialists and politicians, Raoul Wallenberg came to Ann Arbor in 1931 to study architecture at the University of Michigan. Here, his grandfather believed, he could escape the isolation of the elite position of his family and would have the chance to experience the broader world.

Wallenberg wore sneakers and rode a bicycle around campus, living in a boarding house rather than the more exclusive society of the fraternities. His many friends admired his modesty, sense of humor, and insightful intelligence. As an architecture student, he was recognized for his aptitude for finding practical solutions to complex problems. In 1933 he worked in Chicago at the Swedish pavilion in Century of Progress. He spent summers hitchhiking across the US and Canada, and in 1934 drove with a friend to Mexico City in a battered Ford.

He earned his degree with honors in architecture in 1935, winning the American Institute of Architects silver medal for student with highest academic standing.

== The Wallenberg Endowment ==
The Wallenberg Executive Committee, which includes faculty, students and members of the Ann Arbor community, raises funds for the endowment and select the annual medalist.

== Taubman College of Architecture and Urban Planning Wallenberg Scholarships ==
The University's Taubman College of Architecture and Urban Planning also awards Wallenberg Scholarships to exceptional undergraduate and graduate students, many of which are given to enable students to broaden their study of architecture to include work in distant locations.

== Medalists ==
- Elie Wiesel (1990)
- Jan Karski (1991)
- Helen Suzman (1992)
- Tenzin Gyatso, 14th Dalai Lama (1994)
- Miep Gies (1994)
- Per Anger (1995)
- Marion Pritchard (1996)
- Simcha Rotem (1997)
- John Lewis (1999)
- Nina Lagergren (2000)
- Marcel Marceau (2001)
- Kailash Satyarthi (2002)
- William "Bill" Basch (2003)
- Heinz Drossel (2004)
- Paul Rusesabagina (2005)
- Luise Radlmeier (2006)
- Sompop Jantraka (2008)
- Desmond Tutu (2008)
- Lydia Cacho (2009)
- Denis Mukwege (2010)
- Aung San Suu Kyi (2011)
- Maria Gunnoe (2012)
- Ágnes Heller (2014)
- Masha Gessen (2015)
- Bryan Stevenson (2016–2017)
- March For Our Lives and B.R.A.V.E. Youth Leaders (2018)
- Safa Al Ahmad (2019)
- Lucas Benitez (2023)
- Nnimmo Bassey (2024)
- Vladimir Kara-Murza (2025)
