= The Library Project =

Non-profit organization

- Type: Non-profit organization
- Industry: Education
- Founded: 2006
- Headquarters: Xi'an, China
- Key people: Tom Stader (Director and Founder)
- Website: www.library-project.org

The Library Project is a non-profit organization that donates books and libraries to under financed schools and orphanages in China and Vietnam. The Library Project was founded on the principle that education is change and the key to breaking the cycle of poverty in the developing world. The Library Project gets the local community involved through book drives and awareness raising, and partnering with local charities and companies. Since 2006, The Library Project has established over 600 libraries and donated more than 350,000 local and English language books to rural elementary schools and orphanages throughout China and Vietnam with another 350 planned for completion in 2012.

== Programs ==
The Library Project has three distinct programs. All books are purchased in-country via generous individual or company donations or acquired through local community based book drives.

Elementary School Program — Each elementary school receives bi-lingual children's books, tables and chairs, paint and posters.

Orphanage Program — Each small orphanage receives bi-lingual children's books, tables and chairs, paint and posters as well as games and floor mats.

2008 Earthquake Program — The Library Project has provided books and libraries for elementary schools and orphanages in Sichaan and Shanxi Provinces as they have rebuilt as a result of the devastating 2008 earthquake.

== Results ==
- Providing access to books to over 200,000 children
- Donating over 350,000 English and local language children’s books, encyclopedias and reference books
- Creating libraries
- Establishing over 600 libraries in rural elementary schools and orphanages in 21 provinces throughout China and Vietnam

== Locations ==
The Library Project works in some of the most remote regions of China. TLP has established libraries in 21 provinces throughout China with special focus on Sichuan, Anhui and Shaaxi provinces In 2013, TLP expanded their operations within Vietnam.

Some of regions and provinces The Library Project works:

- Anhui Province: Fuyang, Hefei
- Beijing
- Chongqing
- Guangdong Province: Heyuan, Qingyuan
- Guizhou Province: Guiyang
- Hubei Province: Wuhan, Xiangfan
- Inner Mongolia Province: Erdos, Huhhot
- Jiangsu Province: Wuxi
- Jilin Province: Changchun
- Liaoning Province: Dalian, Dandong, Shenyang
- Ningxia Province: Yinchuan
- Shaanxi Province: Xi’an, Baoji, Ankang, Yanan, Weinan, Hanzhong, Xianyang
- Shandong Province: Jinan, Linyi, Dongying
- Shanghai
- Shanxi Province: Taiyuan
- Sichuan Province: Chengdu, Guanghan, Guangyuan
- Xinjiang Province: Urmuqi
- Yunnan Province: Kunming
