= RADION International =

Non-governmental organization

- Formation: 2007
- Founder: Eugene Wee, Benjamin Goh
- Type: Non-governmental organization
- Purpose: Vulnerable & Marginalized Communities
- Location: Singapore, Thailand Laos
- Region served: Thailand Laos Singapore Philippines Myanmar Pakistan
- Method: Child rescue, Advocacy, Rehabilitation, Humanitarian Relief, Disaster Recovery, Community Development, Education, Livelihood development
- Website: www.radion-international.org

RADION International is a Singapore-registered Christian humanitarian relief and development non-government organization (NGO). RADION's core work primarily focuses on both short-term aid, and long-term assistance to underprivileged and marginalized communities in Asia. RADION International, headquartered in Chiang Mai, Thailand, serves communities across Thailand.

RADION has also been involved in short-term projects in disaster areas such as Myanmar, Laos and The Philippines.

RADION's programs cover child rescue and protection, community development and disaster recovery, with the bulk of its work dedicated to aiding vulnerable and at-risk children, and looking upstream to strengthen social safety nets in target communities.

Most of its donors are Singaporeans and Thais.

== Founding ==
RADION International (aka RADION) was founded in 2007, starting as two-man team based in Thailand. The Singaporean founders of RADION had learned of the plight of some 8,900 Hmong from previous humanitarian missions and were inspired to provide aid to the critically needy among the refugees. The Hmong, who had sought asylum in Northern Thailand following the events of the regional conflicts in Laos, had fallen into extreme poverty, with children becoming a particular high-risk group.

The organization designed most of its programs to address the needs of these children and their families, which founders say necessitate long-term efforts of some "20-to-40 years".

As of 2024, the organization has grown in size and scope of influence and currently claims to impact more than 7,000 lives a year. (as reported in their corporate video)

RADION is governed by an International Board of Directors, including both Singaporeans and Thais, with Mr Peter Phan as Chairman of the Singapore Board. The organization is led by Executive Director Eugene Wee, who is also one of the founders.

== Organizational Philosophy ==
The organization is founded on Christian values. According to its founders, RADION's name originates from the combination of two words, "RADIATING" and "MISSION". It strongly believes in reaching vulnerable and needy groups through practical actions and being a catalyst for change within these communities.

The motto of RADION is "Every Life Matters"

=== Long-term Focus ===
RADION targets communities that are underserved due to political, geographical or social constraints. The organization provides aid and promotes community development through a two-pronged approach: administering programs to beneficiaries, while looking upstream to strengthen social safety nets.

The organization is currently the only non-governmental organization serving the Hmong hill-tribe village of Khek Noi — the largest Hmong community in Thailand.

== Impact and Accolades ==
=== Impact ===
RADION is one the early advocates for Asset Based Community Development (ABCD), serving with the community, and working alongside grassroots leaders to bring about change. Through its various initiatives, RADION has brought about significant transformation to the marginalized communities it serves.

Since its inception, RADION's community development initiatives and successful collaboration with local leaders has brought juvenile substance use down from 25% in the early years to the current 8% (as reported in their 2024 Ministry Report video)

In the past, the STREETKIDS! program also saw a 66% rehabilitation success rate for juvenile drug users on the program.

RADION also continues to equip the community with essential knowledge and skills (e.g. training of first responders in first-aid and mental health), with the result that many beneficiaries are now equipped to uplift their own communities.

In recognition of its significant contributions, RADION has been awarded with the following:

=== Awards ===
- Special Consultative Status with the United Nations Economic and Social Council (ECOSOC)
- Recognition award from Social Development Office, Royal Thai Embassy (Singapore)
- named Outstanding Brand by BrandAlliance

== Key Initiatives ==
RADION runs a number of long-term as well as short-term programs in Asia, with most of its efforts targeting under-reached communities in Northern Thailand. The number of initiatives have grown over the years, in response to the evolving needs of their beneficiaries on the ground.

=== 1. StreetKIDS! Rehabilitation Shelter (STK) ===
A rescue and rehabilitation program for children from high-risk backgrounds (i.e. poverty, substance abuse, gang-related activity, physical / sexual abuse and neglect). The program provides education, nutrition, healthcare, emotional support and character development for these children. Beginning in 2008, the StreetKIDS! program served at-risk children of primary school-going age but soon grew to include youth (from 2011). It now shelters children up to the age of 21. In 2012, the StreetKIDS! program also broadened to include a rescue arm which provides direct assistance to children who are at risk of being trafficked as well as victims of abuse.

The program currently operates in two centres located in Thailand - Dream Center (Phetchabun) set up in 2016, and Hope Center (Chiangmai), built in 2022.

- DREAM Center - a shelter for children of primary school-going age brought into the StreetKIDS! program and the base for its rescue arm. The DREAM Center also serves as a community hub and training centre for the Hmong hill-tribe village of Khek Noi where it is located.

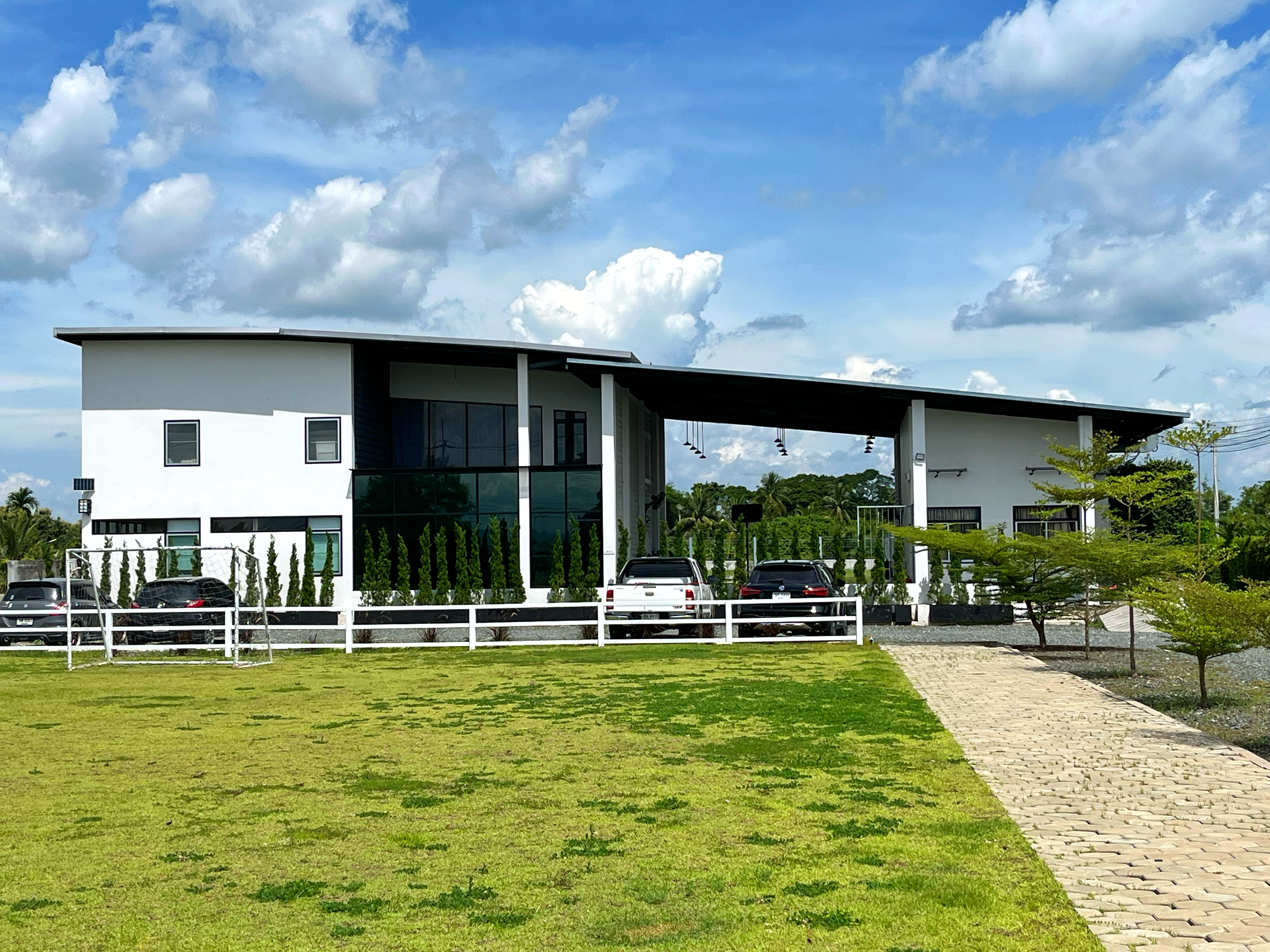
RADION International, HOPE Centre, Chiang Mai, Thailand

- HOPE Center - an integrated trauma care and family service center, which extends support to older child survivors and families who require counselling and therapy. The HOPE Center provides needs assessment, trauma first-aid, counselling and treatment (cognitive behavioral therapy, art therapy, music therapy) which are open to the public.The HOPE Center works on a subsidised and pay it forward model, allowing full-paying patients to offset treatment costs for other lower income families.

=== 2. Community Development ===
Over the years, RADION has made inroads by nurturing social enterprise and other community-based initiatives with the aim of addressing issues of poverty, domestic violence, substance abuse and lack of healthcare among rural communities. These include:

- Project SHOPHOUSE - One of RADION's earliest initiatives which provided low-cost internet access to needy students.
- Integrated farm project - sharing of farming technologies in areas of animal husbandry, agriculture, aquaculture and bio fuel development.
- Social Enterprises for Victims of Domestic Violence - providing jobs, work skills training and rehabilitation in a safe environment to empower womenfolk towards financial independence and self-sufficiency.

It currently runs the Community Development Program (CDP) - a consolidated, holistic programme with a two-pronged approach focusing on:

- Advocacy - to educate youth in an effort to break the vicious cycle of poverty, violence and drugs, and
- social enterprise - to provide practical work-skill training and safe shelter for victims of domestic violence.

=== 3. Village Outreach Program (VO) ===
A dignity program that provides nursing care, nutrition and emotional support to critically needy, disabled and terminally-ill beneficiaries in the community.

=== 4. HOPE Scholarship ===
A scholarship programme started in 2020, in response to the economic downturn post COVID-19 pandemic, where countless Thai families lost the ability to continue funding their children's university education.

The HOPE scholarship provides a bursary to high performing students who have a clear goal of contributing back to their communities after graduation.

== Humanitarian Aid and Crisis Relief ==
RADION provides long-term as well as short-term assistance to needy communities

Project LIVES! - This annual humanitarian relief and awareness campaign operating out of Singapore was first started in 2007 and sought to aid targeted communities by providing relief items through community action.

DREAM Center - RADION provides direct assistance to all rural villages within a 120 km radius of its DREAM Center in Phetchabun, Thailand in the event of natural calamities or disasters that occur in the area. The DREAM Centre also serves as the base from which partner organizations provide medical screening and aid to the village.

The organization also carries out short-term crisis relief as follows:

Humanitarian Relief - projects targeted at channeling timely life-saving support (e.g. food, shelter, medical care and crisis support) to underserved communities in the event of natural disasters or calamities.

Disaster Recovery - projects which aim to provide mid-term assistance to communities impacted by disasters through the provision of livelihood options and economic recovery.

== Past Crisis Relief Projects ==
- "Thailand: Protect Hmong Refugees". Human Rights Watch. August 30, 2007.
- [Jan 2009] - Provided medical assistance to 8 villages within a 120 km of RADION's field office in Phetchabun during the sudden cold snap of 2009
- [Nov 2013 - Jan 2014] - Among the fist to respond after Super Typhoon Haiyan (Yolanda) hit the Philippines. The disaster response team spearheaded missions into Capiz Province that had been devastated by the typhoon but neglected by aid agencies. The relief and rebuilding effort continued for a period of 1 year, with volunteer teams providing medical care, relief items and establishing development initiatives to assist and restore affected communities
- [2017-2020] - the Child protection and development program (CPDP) was initiated to serve communities in Laos, in partnership with the Ministry Of Labour and Social Welfare (MLSW), Laos PDR.
- [2022] - provided aid to families affected by the floods in Chiang Mai
- [2019-2023] - RADION's DREAM center served as the only quarantine centre in the area during the COVID-19 pandemic.
- [2024] - supplied fresh potable water and aid to more than 400 families in Chiang Mai affected by the Flood Crisis in Thailand
- [2025] - Provided food, shelter, medical aid and post-trauma therapy to victims of the 7.7 magnitude Myanmar earthquake.

== Partners and Key Donors ==
RADION International has worked with and is supported by the following sponsors and partners:

=== Companies and Corporations ===
3M	DKSH	Noel Gifts
Active Cool	EM Services	Pan Pacific Singapore
Afiko Delivery	Far East Packaging Industrial Pte Ltd	Pattaya Garden Restaurant
Afton Chemical	GGN Grenature Grains	PeraMakan
APL	GoGo Van	Scoot
Beacons Pharmaceuticals	Green with Envi	Seatrade
Biotronik	Hermitage Wine	SilkAir
Bridge Learning	Hilton Garden Inn	SKS Books
Cathay Pacific	iFLY Singapore	Starhub
Ceva Logistics	INTASE	Syngenta
Chinatown Heritage Centre	Keppel Club	The Dental Studio
Colins Photograffi	LC Development	Tiffany Chairs Rental
CON-LASH	LION Corporation	Trusted Services
Conrad Singapore	Mitsuk OSK Lines (MOL)	Welch Allyn Singapore
Crocs	MSA Singapore	York Hotel
CTC Global	NCL	

=== Non-Profits and Universities ===
Cornerstone Community Services	Project Kyrie
Cru Singapore	Project Light
FoodBank	RauLife
Habitat for Humanity	The Salvation Army
Salt & Light	The Thought Collective
Our Daily Bread Ministries	Youth Guidance Outreach Services (YGOS)
Lee Foundation (Singapore)	Gracefield Foundation (Singapore)
HealthEX	Singapore Management University (SMU)
SCAPE Singapore	National University of Singapore (NUS)
Rotary Club Pandan Valley	

=== Churches and Religious Organizations ===
Paya Lebar Methodist Church	Lighthouse Evangelism Church
Trinity Christian Center	Faith Community Baptist Church
Wesley Methodist Church	Covenant Evangelical Free Church
Grace Assembly of God	Bethesda Frankel Estate Church
Changi Baptist Church	Singapore Bible College

=== Government Agencies ===
National Youth Council (Singapore)
Ministry of Culture, Community and Youth (Singapore)
Royal Thai Embassy (Singapore)
