= Christian Care Foundation for Children with Disabilities =

Thai non-governmental organization

Christian Care Foundation for Children with Disabilities (CCD) is a non-governmental organization in Thailand. It was established in 1986 by Christian Outreach for Relief & Development (CORD), UK. Located in Nonthaburi, north of Bangkok.

The Foundation helps abandoned children with disabilities, regardless of gender, nationality, creed or religion. By May 2007, it provided rehabilitation to about 500 children from the government homes in cooperation with local authorities. It also supports families who have children with disabilities living at home in rural areas, and provides physical therapies, advice, training, and develops parent support networks. CCD have provided training for organizations from Laos, Cambodia and Vietnam on how to develop services to the disabled in these countries.

== Projects ==
- Four day-care centres

Rainbow Day-care - CCD centre for community children and children from Baan Feung Fah Government Children's Home. Baan Feung Fah - CCD centre based at the Government Home for children up to 7 years of age. Baan Rachawadee Girls - CCD centre based at the Government Home for girls and young women age 7 plus. Baan Rachawadee Boys - CCD centre based at the Government Home for boys and young men age 7 plus.

- Small residential care homes

Rainbow House - residential care for approximately 10 children. Happy Home - independent living home for 6 young men. Vision House - independent living home for 6 young men.

- Community-based rehabilitation programs (CBR)

CBR1 - serving families in Nakhon Pathom province. CBR2 - serving families in Nonthaburi and Pathum Thani provinces. CBR3 - serving families in Chai Nat province.

Some of the disabled and needy kids have been adopted by new parents with the help of the Christian Care Foundation. There are former CCD children living in the UK, USA, Australia, Europe and in Thailand.

Donors to CCD are private citizens, humanitarian organizations, business companies, religious organizations.
