= Virtual Interface Adapter =

A Virtual Interface Adapter (VIA) is a network protocol (such as TCP/IP ...) supported by Microsoft SQL Server since July 2005. The specific implementation of VIA will vary from vendor to vendor. In general, it is usually a network kind of interface but is usually a very high-performance, dedicated connection between two systems. Part of that high performance comes from specialized, dedicated hardware that knows that it has a dedicated connection and therefore doesn't have to deal with normal network addressing issues.

The VIA protocol is used to support VIA devices, such as VIA Storage Area Network devices.

Comes in the concept of clustering (i.e.) load balancing method. The load balancer will have this VIA and through VIA it will connect the databases.

The VIA protocol is deprecated by Microsoft, and will be removed in a future version of Microsoft SQL Server. It is however supported in SQL Server 2008, SQL Server 2008 R2, SQL Server 2012, and SQL Server 2014.

== See also ==
- System Area Network
