= Dear Burma =

Non-profit school for Burmese migrants in Thailand

DEAR Burma (Development of Education and Awareness for Refugees from Burma) is a non-profit and non-denominational school for Burmese migrant workers living and working in and around Bangkok, Thailand and located in downtown Bangkok. It was established by Burmese activist Myint Wai from the Thai Action Committee for Democracy in Burma.

The school, founded in 2000, offers a classroom learning experience that is new even to some adult workers, for whom education was a luxury back home. In the 12 years it has been open, more than 12,000 Myanmar workers have studied and graduated from the school.

== History ==
When the school first began operations, classes were conducted in front of Ramkamhaeng University's student club building, where they stayed for several months. The workers organised the classes themselves although it proved quite a hurdle to draw people at first. Refugees and activists also joined the classes eventually. The Thai-Burma Coordinating Committee later decided the school should move to the Christian Students Centre in Bangkok and Myint Wai took the helm of the school.

== Founder / headmaster ==
Headmaster Myint Wai, 57, a former student who fled the military crackdown in 1988, has been a source of hope and offers help to fellow Myanmar citizens in need, including migrant workers. He currently resides in Bangkok.

He attributed the success of the school to the wide range of assistance it gets including from organisations and political groups inside Myanmar which have supported and monitored the work of the school. He has said, in reference to the school, that it is negotiating with both ministries to be recognised as a vocational training institute in Thailand.

As many Burmese migrant workers do not speak or read Thai, they don’t know local laws, regulations or traditional culture, so problems often occur between Thai authorities and migrant workers. We want to solve this problem by providing them with training.

— Mying Wai, Bangkok Post, July 2, 2011, Other Migration Issues in Mekong

Myint is also the deputy director of the TACDB.

== Classes ==
The school is open Sundays to teach Thai language, English language, Burmese language, photography and computer skills to migrants who have immigrated from Myanmar to start a new life in Bangkok. The school also has a traditional dance class.
