= Catholic Office for Emergency Relief and Refugees =

Catholic Office for Emergency Relief and Refugees (COERR) is a private non-profit organization, established by the Catholic Bishops Conference of Thailand (CBCT) in 1978.

The Office's declared mission is to provide relief to people affected by natural disaster, give assistance to the refugees and displaced persons, as well as to the poor and the needy Thai individuals, including the local population affected by the influx of refugees into Thailand. COERR takes part in the operations of Committee for Coordination of Services to Displaced Persons in Thailand (CCSDPT).

In 1986 the organization was awarded Pope John XXIII International Peace Prize by Pope John Paul II.

The President of the Catholic Office for Emergency Relief and Refugees is Michael Cardinal Michai Kitbunchu.

== Border Programs ==
- Relief Support
- Education
- Environmental Protection & Agricultural Training/Production
- Self-Help Activities
- Separated Children
- Community-Based Waste Management
- Preservation of Traditional Ethnic Arts & Crafts through the Elderly

== Programs for Thai Communities ==
- Vocational Training (Sewing and Auto-mechanical Classes) for the poor youth in Surin and Buriram provinces on the Thai-Cambodian border.
- Assistance to Elderly and Handicapped Villagers in remote provinces by means of Consumable Supplies for the Needy.
- Assistance to Children of Landmine Victims by means of Education Supplies.
- Assistance to Handicapped Schoolchildren in Surin and Buriram provinces by means of Education Supplies.
- Catholic Volunteer Services for Emergency Relief.
- Volunteers for Social and Environmental Development (VSED) rendered in schools and community.
- Health Promoting Schools
- Floods Preparedness Training
