= Adventist Development and Relief Agency =

Humanitarian agency operated by the Seventh-day Adventist Church

Adventist Development and Relief Agency (ADRA)
- Founded: 1956
- Founder: Seventh-day Adventist Church
- Type: Humanitarian/Aid/Disaster Relief/Development
- Location: Silver Spring, Maryland, US
- Region served: 12o+ Countries Worldwide
- Product: ADRA implements region-appropriate solutions for positive and sustainable change where it is needed most across 4 crucial impact areas: Health, Education, Livelihoods, and Emergency Relief. ADRA's core development objective is the well-being of those they serve, taking a holistic approach to programs, humanitarian response and advocacy.
- Owner: Seventh-day Adventist Church
- Key people: Paulo Lopes, President; Teresa Ferreira, Vice-President for Strategic Engagement and Growth; Jair Parada, Vice President for Finance; Thierry Van Bignoot, Vice-President for Sustainable Development; Imad Madanat, Vice-President for People and Excellence.
- Revenue: $173,000,000 (2009)
- Employees: 5,000 (2009)
- Website: adra.org

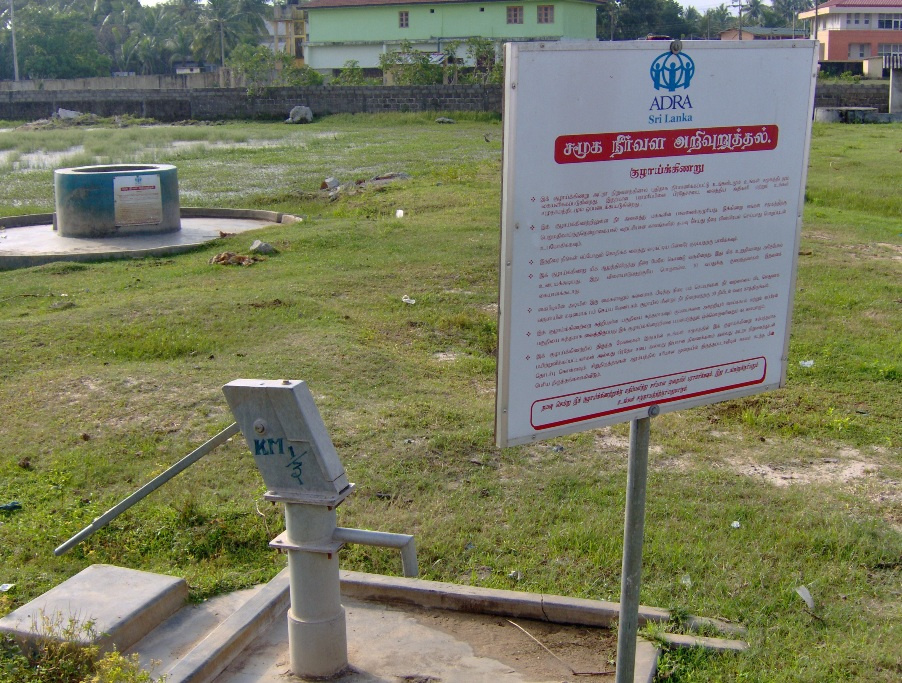
Drinking-fountain in Sri Lanka built by ADRA support, after the 2004 Indian Ocean earthquake and tsunami

The Adventist Development and Relief Agency International (ADRA or ADRA International) is a humanitarian agency operated by the Seventh-day Adventist Church for the purpose of providing individual and community development and disaster relief. It was founded in 1956, and it is headquartered in Silver Spring, Maryland, United States.

In 2004, ADRA reported assisting nearly 24 million people with more than US$159 million in aid. Its staff numbered over 4,000 members. As of the end of 2007, it had operations in 125 countries. According to Forbes, in 2005, ADRA ranked among America's 200 largest charities

Adventist Development and Relief Agency (ADRA) is a faith-based, non-governmental organization that has made strides of holistic effort for the perseverance of human well-being. This organization is motivated by religious beliefs regarding humanity and distributes social service through volunteers.

ADRA distributes relief to communities living in life-threatening poverty, war impacted zones and other critical living conditions.

== Mission ==
The organization's mission statement is: "ADRA works with people in poverty and distress to create just and positive change through empowering partnerships and responsible actions." Its stated reason for existence is "to follow Christ's example by being a voice for, serving, and partnering with those in need", and the 1983 organizational documents include a biblical rationale for conducting humanitarian work.

== Purpose ==
ADRA partners with communities, organizations, and governments in order to develop:

- Food Security
- Economic Development
- Primary Health
- Emergency Management
- Basic Education

ADRA says that it serves people without discriminating against their ethnic, political, or religious association. Priority is given to those with disabilities, children, and senior citizens.

ADRA's areas of expertise include: Education, Emergencies, Food/nutrition, HIV/AIDS, Health, Refugees and IDPs, Shelter, Training and development, Water and sanitation, Women, Children, Monitoring and Evaluation, Programme management, and Security.

A Los Angeles Times story from 1998 reports on ADRA's 1996 10-year strategic plan, which calls the agency "a bona fide ministry of Jesus Christ and the Seventh-day Adventist Church" and "provides a strategy to reach people previously untouched by other church institutions. The church's mission is incomplete without ADRA's distinctive ministry." Much has been said about faith-based agencies taking US government funding and using those funds to further religious doctrinal missions, however, ADRA does not proselytise. It claims to operate "by love with no strings attached". As a global organisation, ADRA is a signatory of the Code of Conduct for the International Red Cross and Red Crescent Movement and NGOs in Disaster Relief, which states that "aid will not be used to further a particular political or religious standpoint", that "aid is given regardless of the race, creed, or nationality", and that organizations "shall respect culture and custom."

This organization has helped a total of 25.3 million people throughout 120 countries, with over a thousand of projects created over the years. ADRA claims their main focus areas are “improving health,” “increasing livelihoods,” “providing access to education,” and “responding to disasters.” This charity has only met an increase of need and opportunity as the years have gone by. Over time, they are expanding their outreach.

== History ==
ADRA was established as the Seventh-day Adventist Welfare Service (SAWS) in November 1956. The name was changed to Seventh-day Adventist World Service in 1973.

In 1983, the organisation was renamed the 'Adventist Development and Relief Agency' to better reflect its missions and activities.

=== International Development Degree Program ===
In 1996 ADRA and Andrews University established the ADRA Professional Leadership Institute (APLI). The institute provided field-based training and continuing professional education to ADRA staff around the world. By the year 2000, the APLI program was used as a model by the Food Aid Management members as an example of "best practices for local capacity building." The model was well received by Africare, World Vision, and others. By 2003, the ADRA and Andrews University partnership offered a master's degree in International Development. More than 160 students had graduated. Sixty of those graduates had moved into management positions across the network. Seventh-day Adventist institutions of higher education on four continents offered degrees in International Development.

=== United Nations ===
The United Nations Economic and Social Council (ECOSOC) granted ADRA general Consultative Status in 1997.

=== Emergency response ===
As of 2014, ADRA International had responded to approximately 60 emergencies worldwide, by which more than 127,000 people have directly benefited.

Ten years later, in 2024, ADRA had an outreach to 120 countries resulting in over 1,600 projects reaching over 21 million lives.

During the COVID-19 outbreak, ADRA created their "Stronger Together" global response to maximize effectiveness in assistance during a time when mobility was highly restricted throughout the world. By March, 2021,ADRA had implemented 422 projects in 96 countries impacting nearly 20 million beneficiaries.

=== Foundational Beliefs ===
The Adventist Development and Relief Agency (ADRA) is a humanitarian agency that is faith based. Their outreach targets nations that experience poverty, disaster-struck areas, lack of educational opportunities and populations needing advocacy.

This organization has made strides of holistic efforts for the perseverance of human well-being. This organization is motivated by religious beliefs regarding humanity and distributes social service through volunteers.

Although faith based and operated by the Seventh-Day Adventist Church, they do not discriminate. With a motto of, “to serve humanity so all may live as God intended,” their belief is in giving freely to all in need. ADRA believes in human rights, yet are motivated by their religious beliefs. ADRA is funded through several contributions such as donations from corporations, community, governmental and nongovernmental organizations.

Their outlook on development originates from a Christian perspective that "development is transformation."

Outreach

Outreach is based on the concept of "love thy neighbor" that Jesus stated in Matthew 22:39. To that end, ADRA works with other faith-based groups. For example, since 1995, ADRA has worked with the Church of Jesus Christ of Latter-day Saints starting with a project to feed hungry people in Ecuador.

Through examination of ADRA's impact in Hargeisa, North-Western Somalia, there were several projects to contribute to the well-being of this small community. This study documents that ADRA created opportunities for skill development that directly led to town improvement. However, humane and sustainability matters are in question, such with many other NGOs.

In Hargeisa, many locals of the small community saw a large increase of their skill-set, yet low employment rates which led to no increase of their income, continuing the cycle of poverty. However, the majority of the community did not suffer from worse negative impacts. Although, in examination of ADRA's attempts for self-reliance and increase of income in Ghana, the attempts deemed successful for the majority.

ADRA also assisted in developing electricity in schools, stoves to provide a flow of food while training individuals to become electricians or manufacturers. Their goal was to assist in the present, but create self-sustaining careers to help with the social and economic development of the community.

Socio-Economic Development

NGOs are committed to helping the lives of the poverty stricken, alleviating those levels and creating a sustainable life for people in communities. ADRA has been a contributor to this development, significantly in the Global South.

ADRA has been established in Bangladesh since 1997. This organization has created sustainable development contributing to the social and economic uprising of Bangladesh. Their attempts to decrease poverty levels were successful by distributing workforce lessons and more. It gave the members of these communities a livelihood by giving them an income. This supports the local economy as well as people and their family's survival.

Another major part of Bangladesh's growing economy was the effort of ADRA vocational training in the health-care industry. Impacting overall health creates a positive environment and hopeful livelihood of human-beings, but also provides more income opportunities. AAs they provided aid to those who were underprivileged during disaster relief missions, they took the opportunity to let professionals train others, while creating jobs.

ADRA worked towards nation building in the southern global regions, including Bangladesh. A notable project from this organization was the “Women’s Development Project.” Women were placed in communities where they lived and worked alongside other women surviving in that community. Their outreach began by teaching basic hygiene for infection control and disease prevention. They also trained women to assist with labor and delivery plus including their own materials for themselves. This was a contribution equally important to the social and economic development of women in Bangladesh, while contributing to physical health.

Nonetheless, Bangladesh is still in desperate need of help and improvements need to be underway from all actors in the south. ADRA’s efforts now in 2024, compared to those in 1997, have continued to grow, but not at the exact rate predicted years ago.

== See also ==
- Seventh-day Adventist Church
- List of Seventh-day Adventist hospitals
- List of Seventh-day Adventist medical schools
- List of Seventh-day Adventist secondary schools
- List of Seventh-day Adventist colleges and universities
- Seventh-day Adventist interfaith relations – for relations with other Protestants and Catholics
