= Charity Foundation for the Blind in Thailand =

Thai non-profit organization

The Charity Foundation for the Blind in Thailand Under the Royal Patronage of H.M. the King
- มูลนิธิธรรมิกชนเพื่อคนตาบอดในประเทศไทย ในพระบรมราชูปภัมภ์
- Abbreviation: CFBT
- Established: December 2, 1978; 47 years ago
- Founder: Mr. Prayat Punong-ong
- Type: NGO
- Legal status: Charity Foundation
- Purpose: International development, disability rights, Morality, Education, Accessibility for the blind
- Coordinates: Headquarter 16.440432°N 102.805105°E
- Services: 15 Service Centers
- Main organ: board
- Subsidiaries: 9 Branches
- Staff: 300+ (2014)
- Website: www.cfbt.funwww.cfbt.or.th
- Formerly called: Christian Home for Education of the Blind and The Christian Foundation for the Blind in Thailand

The Charity Foundation for the Blind in Thailand (CFBT) is a non-profit charitable organization helping blind people and employing staff in Thailand regardless of gender, race or religion. It was founded in 1978 by Prayat Punong-ong, a blind man who taught 13 blind children in a rental house in Khon Kaen Province.

In 2024, the name was changed to The Charity Foundation for the Blind in Thailand (CFBT) to better reflect its mission and dedication to supporting people with visual impairments across the country. The foundation continues its work to improve the quality of life for the blind through various programs, including education, rehabilitation, and community integration initiatives.

CFBT declares its mission to provide professional services and management to the visually impaired, improving their quality of life and helping them to live in harmony with themselves and other people.

== Vision ==
- Blind persons living normally and equally with other people in the society

== Philosophy ==
- Lives start with chance

== Missions ==
- Nurture of blind people in living skills, education and vocation to their potential, maintaining transparent governance and management that are acceptable globally, promoting accessibility and conserving good culture

== Objectives ==
1. To conduct educational arrangements, establish educational institutions for people with visual impaired and people with visual impaired and other disabilities in all types and levels of education.

2. To promote and support people with visual impaired and other disabilities regarding opportunities for admission to general educational institutions of all types and levels of education.

3. To establish a unit to produce, procure, provide media services, maintain and guarantee media borrowing, equipment, technology, facilities educational and career materials to people with visual impaired and other disabilities. Addition, their caregivers to improve their quality of life on an equal footing with the general public.

4. To be a center for vocational training for people with visual impaired and other disabilities and caregivers of people with visual impaired in agriculture, handicrafts, commerce and other fields, as well as encouraging occupations or sorting fund or guarantees for loans from the fund for the Promotion and Development of Quality of Life of Persons with Disabilities according to the limit. The rules and conditions are set out in the regulations for people with visual impaired and other disabilities as well. Be self-reliant and live in society with dignity and happiness.

5. To establish vocational training centers in Thai massage, both at the professional level of Thai traditional medicine, Thai massage, and at the level of health service providers by establishing medical institutions and health establishments to be institutions for transferring knowledge to people with visual impaired and other disabilities.

6. To establish a service center for people with visual impaired as a counseling unit as a source of demonstration learning. Education Management, Career Promotion, Rehabilitation Use of technology Independent living and others to people with visual impaired and other disabilities Family and Stakeholders.

7. To encourage people with visual impaired and other disabilities and their caregivers have equal access to rights with the general public.

8. To protect the rights and prevent abuse of people with visual impaired and other disabilities.

9. To collect and store a variety of information. In the provision of services to people with visual impaired and other disabilities and those who are interested through online services.

10. Encourage research, innovation and inventions to improve the quality of life of people with visual impaired and other disabilities and their families in all dimensions.

11. To promote and support social enterprise companies with the objective of allocating profits to charitable organizations to allocate profits to support the Foundation's mission.

12. To cooperate with government agencies and organizations both domestically and internationally to promote activities that are beneficial to people with visual impaired and other disabilities and their caregivers.

13. Jointly operate with other organizations with similar objectives in the public interest.

14. Do not take any action related to politics.

== History ==
In 1978, Mr. Prayat Punong-ong, a visually impaired graduate, rented half of a house in Soi Tharnthip, Prachasamran Road, Nai Mueang Subdistrict, Mueang District, Khon Kaen Province. This was made possible by a donation of 10,082 Baht from Mrs. Rose Lim, a Singaporean lady, and 12 beds donated by World Vision Foundation of Thailand. This initial capital was used to establish the "Christian Welfare Center for the Education of the Blind."

Mr. Prayat Punong-ong began teaching 13 blind children in that rented half-house, which served as both their learning space and dormitory. Volunteers joined Mr. Prayat with the goal of preparing these 13 children physically and mentally, developing their daily living skills, and teaching them Braille reading and writing, with the hope that they would eventually have the opportunity to study alongside sighted children.

This house became a place where people offered assistance, donating funds, food, and volunteering for various activities, which gradually fostered a more positive attitude towards blind people among the general public.

In 1981, a plot of land was donated for the establishment of the "Khon Kaen Blind Development Education Center" at 214 Moo 10, Maliwan Road, Ban Ped Subdistrict, Mueang District, Khon Kaen Province. This center was set up to provide educational services for the increasing number of blind individuals.

In 1983, the Foundation received legal approval for registration as the Christian Foundation for the Blind in Thailand, with Mr. Chalermchai Jittayothorn as its Chairman. In 1984, His Majesty King Bhumibol Adulyadej (Rama IX) graciously granted the Foundation his royal patronage, leading to its renaming as the "Christian Foundation for the Blind in Thailand Under the Royal Patronage."

In 1988, the Ministry of Finance officially declared the Foundation as Public Charity Organization No. 174.

In 2024, the Foundation's Board of Directors resolved to change the English name of the Foundation from "The Christian Foundation for the Blind in Thailand under the Patronage of H.M. the King" to "The Charity Foundation for the Blind in Thailand under the Patronage of H.M. the King."

The Foundation has been operating for 47 years, having provided educational services, vocational promotion, and rehabilitation to over 10,000 persons with visual impairments. Currently, the Foundation oversees 26 units, consisting of the Head Office and 11 provincial branch offices, 10 educational institutions, namely: Khon Kaen School for the Blind, Roi Et School for the Blind, Nakhon Ratchasima School for the Blind, Lop Buri School for the Blind and Blind Persons with Multiple Disabilities, Thammasakol Hat Yai School for the Blind, Dhammika Wittaya School, Cha-am School for Blind Children with Multiple Disabilities, Baan Dek Ramintra School, Mae Sai School for the Blind, and Khon Kaen Vocational College for the Blind. Additionally, there are 5 other support units: Nakhon Nayok Center for Career Promotion and Development for the Blind with Multiple disabilities, Educational Technology Center for the Blind, Community-Based Rehabilitation Learning Center for the Blind, Benyalai Library, and the Northeast Institute for the Promotion and Development of Quality of Life for Blind People. These units employ a total of 420 staff members, and collectively serve a total of 2,000 students, learners, and blind individuals in the community. The Foundation requires an annual operating budget of approximately 180 million Baht. Throughout its operation, the Foundation's income has primarily come from public donations, with approximately 20% of total revenue derived from government subsidies.

The Foundation continuously strives to improve the quality of life for persons with visual impairments, enabling them to receive education, pursue careers, earn income to support themselves and their families, and live with dignity and honor in society. This success is a direct result of the continuous support received from the public for the Foundation's mission.

== Branches and Service Centers ==
1. Khon Kaen

- Headquarters
- Khon Kaen Province Branch Office
- Khon Kaen School for the Blind
- Northeast Institute for the Promotion and Development of Quality of Life for Blind People
- Educational Technology Center for the Blind
- Khon Kaen Vocational College for the Blind

2. Bangkok

- Bangkok Branch Office
- Baan Dek Ramindra School

3. Maha Sarakham

- Community-Based Rehabilitation Learning Center for the Blind

4. Nakhon Ratchasima

- Nakhon Ratchasima Province Branch Office
- Nakhon Ratchasima School for the Blind
- Benyalai Library

5. Roi Et

- Roi Et Province Branch Office
- Roi Et School for the Blind

6. Lopburi

- Lopburi Province Branch Office
- Lopburi School for the Blind and Blind Persons with Multiple Disabilities

7. Songkhla

- Songkhla Province Branch Office
- Thammasakon Hat Yai School for the Blind

8. Phetchaburi

- Phetchaburi Province Branch Office
- Dhammika Wittaya School

9. Nakhon Nayok

- Nakhon Nayok Province Branch Office
- Center for Career Promotion and Development for the Blind with Multiple disabilities

10. Cha-am

- Cha-am Branch Office
- Cha-am School for Blind Children with Multiple Disabilities

11. Chiang Rai

- Chiang Rai Province Branch Office
- Mae Sai School for the Blind

== Programs ==
CFBT supports more than 4,000 blind children and young adults a year through the following programs:

- Dormitory
- Preparatory education program
- Inclusive education program
- Rehabilitation and re-Integration
- Scholarship for blind students
- Job placement assistance for the blind
- Community based rehabilitation (CBR)
- Research and development of assistive technology for the blind
- Production of Braille and talking books
- Training and services on assistive technology for visually impaired people

It is a member of the Thailand National Committee on DAISY Production and Services (TNCD).
