= Vias, Hérault =

Vias
- Commune
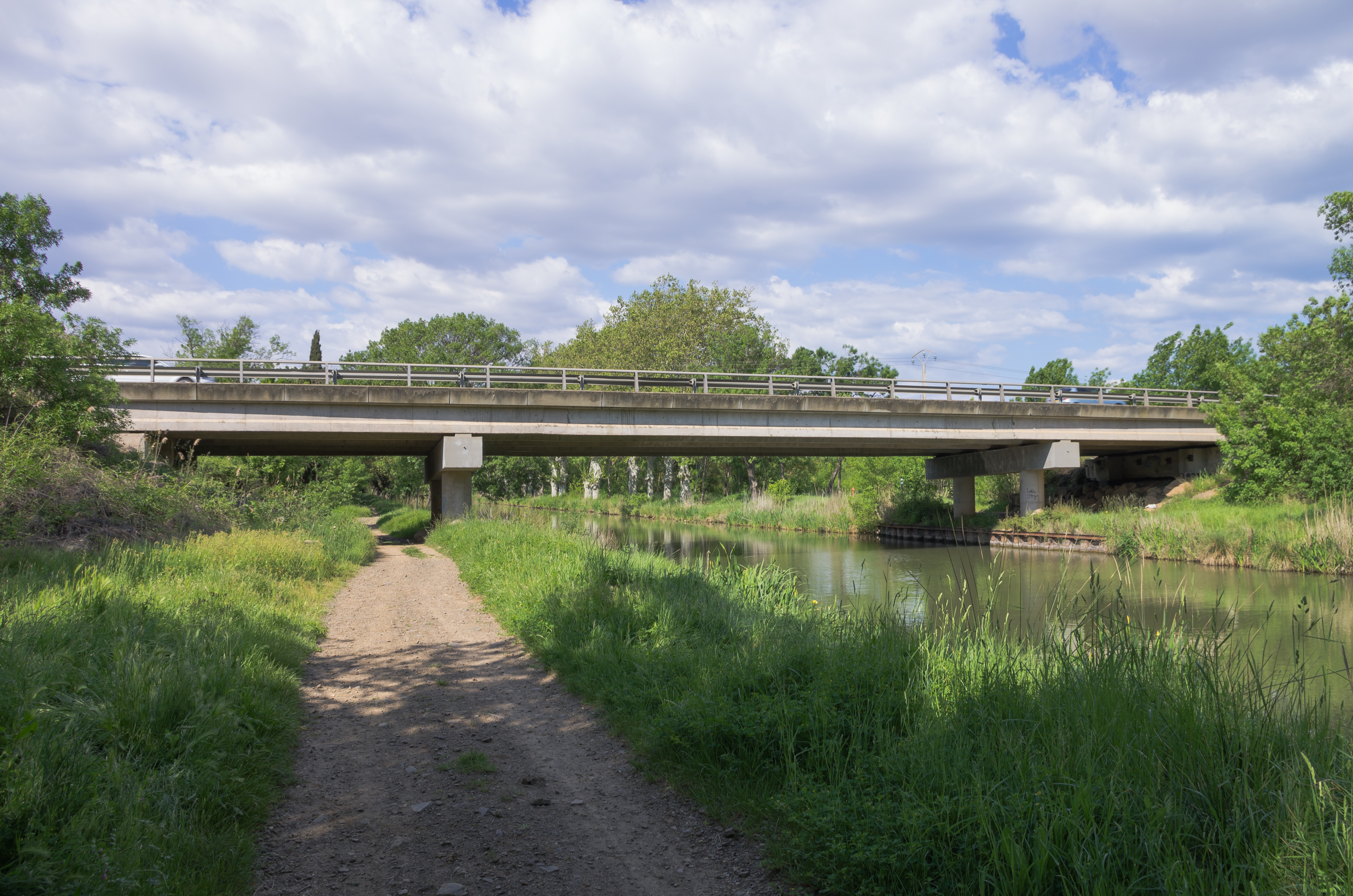
- Bridge over the Canal du Midi

- Coat of arms
- Location of Vias
- Location within France Location within Occitanie
- Coordinates: 43°18′49″N 3°25′09″E
- Country: France
- Region: Occitania
- Department: Hérault
- Arrondissement: Béziers
- Canton: Agde
- Intercommunality: CA Hérault Méditerranée

Government
  - Mayor (2020–2026): Jordan Dartier
- Area^{1}: 32.49 km^{2} (12.54 sq mi)
- Elevation: 5 m (16 ft)
- Highest elevation: 33 m (108 ft)
- Lowest elevation: 0 m (0 ft)
- Population (2023): 5,952
  - Density: 183.2/km^{2} (474.5/sq mi)
- Time zone: UTC+01:00 (CET)
  - Summer (DST): UTC+02:00 (CEST)
- INSEE/Postal code: 34332 /34450
- ^{1} French Land Register data, which excludes lakes, ponds, glaciers > 1 km^{2} (0.386 sq mi or 247 acres) and river estuaries.

Vias (French pronunciation: [vjas]; Occitan: Viaç) is a resort town and commune located in the Hérault department of the Occitanie region of Southern France.

It is a popular holiday destination, with many camp and caravan sites. Near Vias, the Canal du midi crosses the river Libron, an interesting historic engineering work. Vias station has rail connections to Narbonne, Montpellier and Avignon. The town has two main sections, Vias Plage and Vias. Vias main town (Commonly referred to as Centre ville) is the historic part of Vias and the main urban area. it is separated from the Vias Plage by a canal and rural areas. Vias Plage is the main resort area of Vias. It is known for its sandy beaches and large camp sites and holiday apartments.

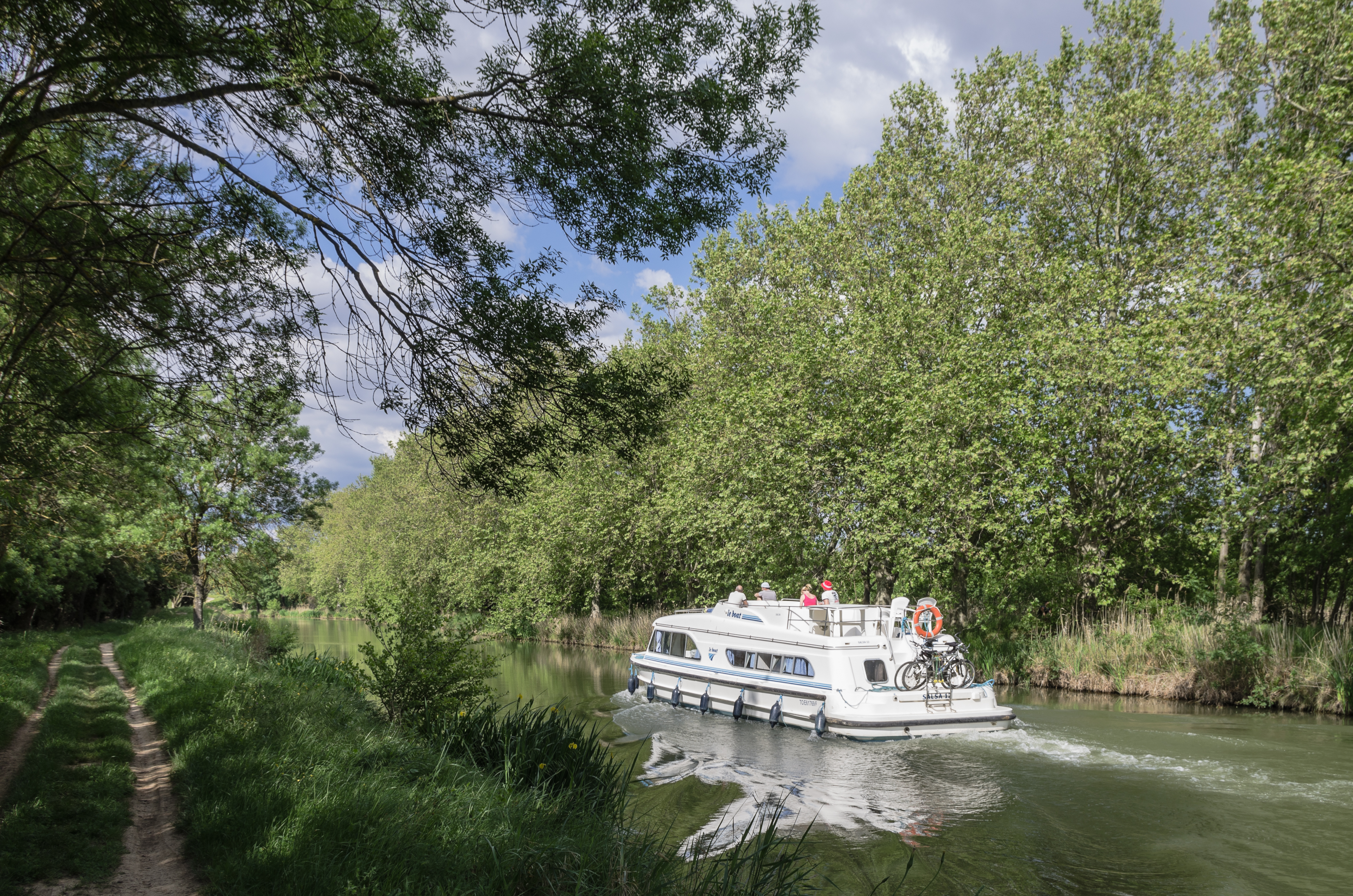
A boat on the Canal du Midi

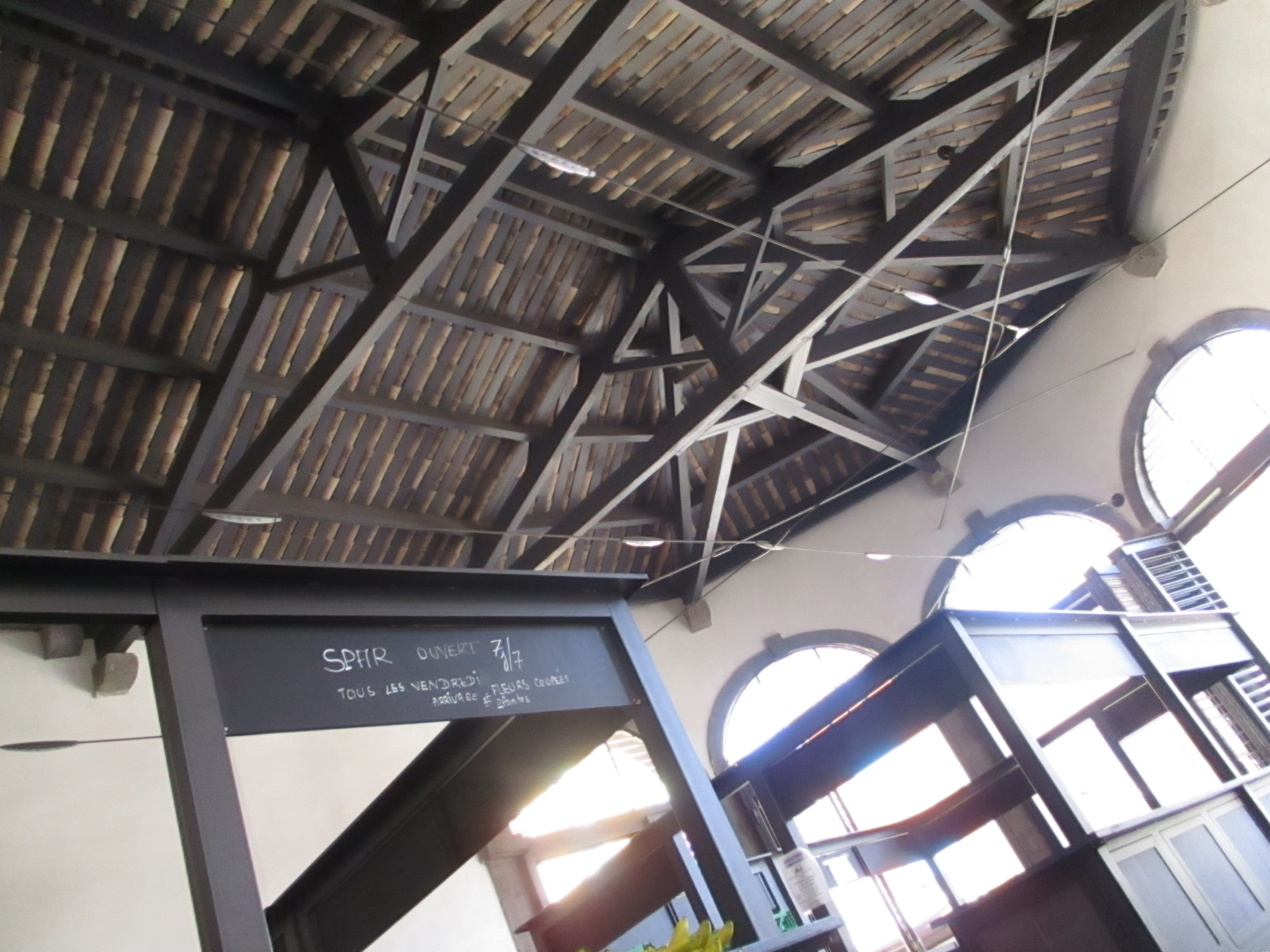
Vias market hall 1830 renovated

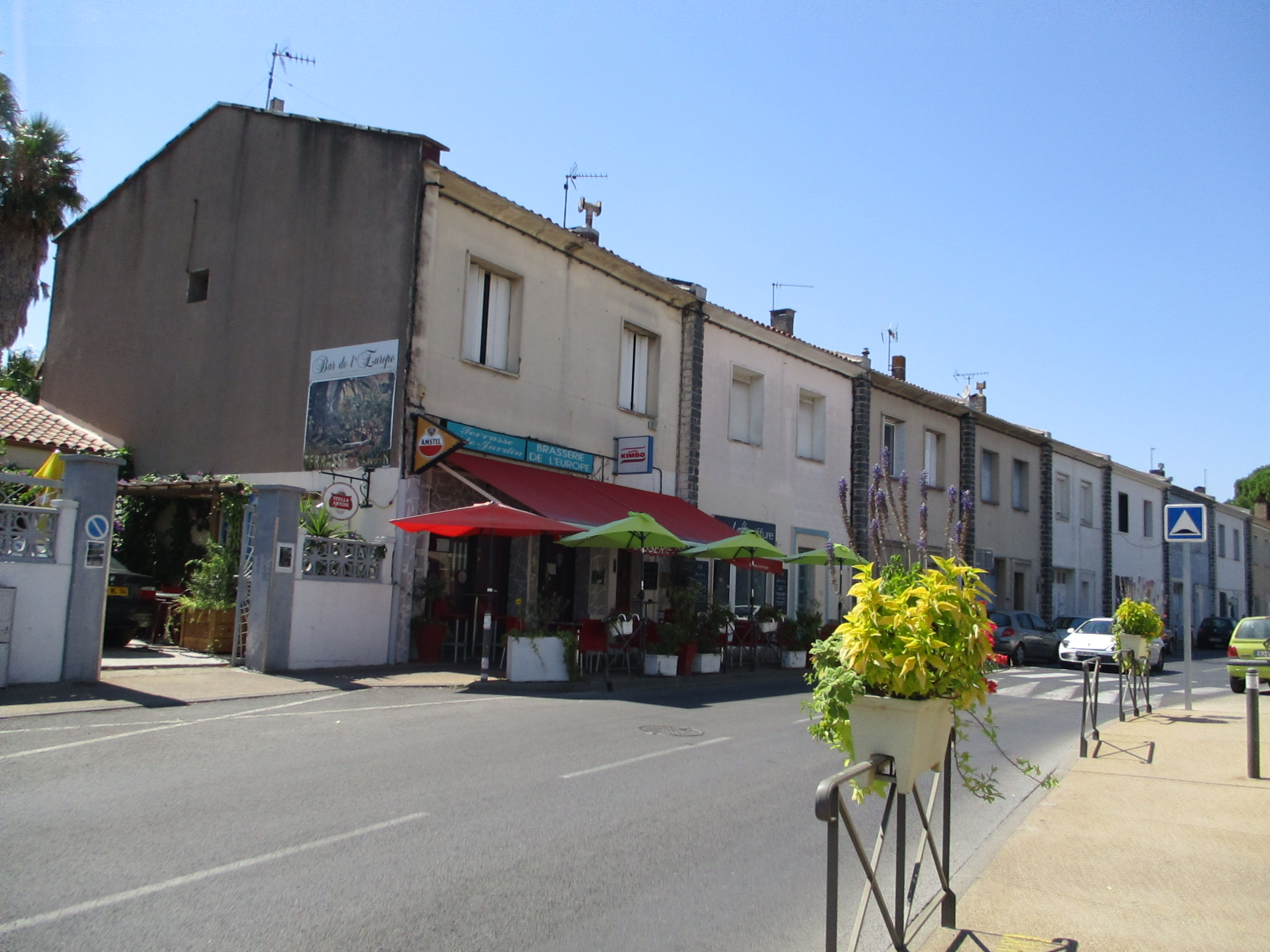
Vias 1950s-style housing development on the main circular street facing St Jean Baptiste church

== Population ==
Historical population
Year	Pop.	±% p.a.
1968	2,364	—
1975	2,582	+1.27%
1982	2,934	+1.84%
1990	3,517	+2.29%
1999	4,354	+2.40%
2007	5,386	+2.69%
2012	5,366	−0.07%
2017	5,719	+1.28%
2023	5,952	+0.67%
Source: INSEE

== Energy ==
Around 17% of the commune's electricity is provided by local solar power installations.

== See also ==
- Communes of the Hérault department
