= Openmind Projects =

OpenmindProjects
- Formation: January 1, 2001; 25 years ago
- Type: Non-government organization
- Legal status: Active
- Purpose: Education Opportunities for poor youth in SE Asia, Environment Protection and Wildlife Conservation
- Location: OpenmindProjects Foundation 221Moo 3, Tambon Mi Chai Thanon Somdej, Maung, Nong Khai 43000
- Coordinates: 16°28′26″N 102°49′19″E
- Region served: Thailand, Laos, Cambodia, Nepal
- Members: Sven Mauleon (Founder, co-director), Gaweechat Joompaula (Co-founder, co-director)
- Founder: Sven Mauleon and Thaweesilp Lunchaiyapha (changed his name to Gaweechat Joompaula in 2010)
- Website: www.openmindprojects.org

OpenmindProjects (OMP), in Nong Khai Province, Thailand is a developmental aid organisation focused on helping communities in Thailand, Laos, Cambodia, and Nepal through the creation and management of grass roots projects in the areas of e-learning, education, and environment. The focus of the organisation is using information and communication technologies (ICT) to educate individuals in schools, orphanages, national parks, and villages. Projects rely on volunteers to promote changes in local communities.

OMP was founded in 2001 by Swedish management consultant Sven Mauleon and Gaweechat Joompaula, the first local volunteer in the pioneering "IT in Isan" project, a self-taught computer wizard from a rice farming family. In 2001 Gaweechat began helping orphans to use computers and designed the organization's first website. Since then OMP has supported some 60 schools, orphanages, national parks, and villages in Thailand, Laos, Cambodia, and Nepal. OpenmindProjects acts as a private aid organization, bringing essential knowledge about computers, English and conservation to developing countries in Asia.

== History ==
2001 - OpenmindProjects, then called IT in Isan, pioneered computer training projects in poor Thai villages in an effort to see how the digital divide could be bridged. Computers were placed in homes and schools in villages and villagers given unlimited access to the resource. The idea was to give children and teenagers a chance to learn how to use computers and to learn other subjects with the help of computers.

2002 - OpenmindProjects introduced computer and Internet-based learning to Thai villages, orphan homes and schools (where teachers and education material are scarce) to inspire students to use computers and Internet to learn English and other subjects. OpenmindProjects started inviting volunteers to teach in remote villages, schools, and orphan homes.

2004 - OpenmindProjects started supporting responsible eco tourism and community development projects in Laos and Thailand, to help local people and to protect nature and wildlife. In fall of 2004 OpenmindProjects expanded to south Thailand, to Satun Province, Krabi Province, and Phang Nga Province. In December 2004 the first workshops with local schools and national parks took place. On 26 December the tsunami hit these regions. OpenmindProjects was one of the first organizations to help tsunami-hit schools.

2006 - OpenmindProjects started supporting community eco projects in Cambodia and Nepal. OpenmindProjects arranged local teacher training workshops for Thai teachers together with international volunteers and sent qualified volunteers to help teachers improve education at their own schools. It advocated team teaching as a way to improve English teaching at Thai schools.

2006 - OpenmindProjects was chosen by CNN for their "Be the Change" initiative. As part of the program CNN selected volunteers from eight organisations in various countries to report on their experiences. CNN recommends these eight organisations as part of the initiative, of which OpenmindProjects is one. OpenmindProjects begins supporting health projects in Thailand and Nepal.

2008 - OpenmindProjects was a finalist in the Stockholm Challenge in April, 2008 for its work on ICT for development.

2009 - Openmind Traveler, a new ecotourism organisation was created as a sister program by OpenmindProjects to promote sustainable tourism and travel in Laos and Thailand.

Previous logo

2010 - OpenmindProjects began supporting community projects in Karen villages, schools, and refugee camps along the Thai-Burmese border. Also community projects in conjunction with Nong Khai Aquarium and Khon Kaen University.

== Projects ==
=== Teaching English overseas ===
As English has become a "world language", English language skills are becoming more important for people all across the world. This is especially true for people in developing countries, where having good English can open up new jobs and educational opportunities. OpenmindProjects has English teaching placements in northeastern and southern Thailand, Laos, Cambodia, and Nepal. Placements include such things as primary and secondary schools, nurseries, orphanage homes, and national parks. By teaching English in poor communities, language skills, lives, and future prospects are improved.

It is not a requirement for volunteers at OpenmindProjects to be English teachers. Volunteers are required to have a certain level of English. The main criteria are willingness to teach, flexibility, and adaptability for working in a developing country. Team teaching is the preferred teaching method promoted by OpenmindProjects and prior to teaching, volunteers undergo a three-day training program at the OpenmindProjects Training Center in Nong Khai, Thailand to teach them team teaching.

=== Ecotourism and wildlife conservation ===
Ecology and wildlife volunteers can go to projects in national parks and villages to teach English, create ecotourism information and help improve community-based ecotourism services. The eco-volunteer explains the advantages of community-based ecotourism to the local community and provides ecotourism training to gain from ecotourism in the community. Most of the ecotourism revenue too often stays with travel agencies and tour operators.

Responsible ecotourism and conservation is a means to help the local community, national parks, and villages to preserve and prosper from a living nature. Ecotourism in Thailand and Laos is tourism that avoids damage to the environment that commonly occurs with mass tourism. It also involves the local population, helping offer an alternative source of income to communities.

Ecovolunteers have the option of training local guides, rangers, host families, and children in the English language, designing and drafting English ecotourism brochures and pamphlets, preparing English information for national parks and assisting local ecotourism projects by developing local resources such as accommodation, transportation, trekking, guide services, and food. All ecovolunteers can participate in trekking and sightseeing whilst on placement.

Eco-volunteer placements are located all across Thailand and Laos. Some are in jungles, mountains, wildlife sanctuaries, by the sea and on islands. Volunteers with the specific qualifications are also needed for web design of national park and ecotourism sites, GIS, mapping, surveys, and scuba dives.

=== Computer training ===
IT volunteer placements are offered in Thailand and Cambodia at the OpenmindProjects Training Centre in Nong Khai, at schools and orphanages, and on ecotourism conservation projects and include e-learning projects, IT and website projects, and teaching. Volunteers have a choice of teaching and e-learning resource development, web design for projects (schools, national parks), database, photo management, creation of promotional material, training local teachers and staff, teach IT/computer lessons to students and staff in schools.

=== Health education ===
In many developing countries, hospitals and clinics often do not have enough resources, enough training, and enough English ability to cater to patients. Health placements with Openmind are available in Thailand and Nepal. Placements in Thailand are broad. Volunteers who have experience in the health industry (doctors, nursing, pharmacy) are placed in medical centres and hospitals and can teach in their field. However, teaching in English is also needed, and volunteers can be placed in the same placements in Thailand. Conditions on Nepal placements are challenging. Hospitals are small and lack facilities as they are in remote areas. It is recommended that only seasoned travellers and seasoned medical professionals take on Nepal health placements. Volunteers have to pass these requirements to be fit for placements in Nepal.

=== English camps ===
OpenmindProjects offers a summer camp for local students in northeast Thailand(Isan) and south Thailand (Krabi). Camps are targeted at students interested in learning English regardless of social status, wealth, or school grade. Students at several schools are chosen by their teachers based on their motivation to learn English. Camps are run free of charge by volunteers and staff usually over a period of five days. Over a three-week period during the school holidays each site can have up to three camps, with a rotation of about 100 children per site.

=== Internships ===
Internships are available in the fields of English, computers, tourism, health, conservation, environment, and GIS in Thailand, Laos, or Nepal. Internships are individually tailored with interns on behalf of their school or university. Over 60 projects based in schools, orphanages, villages, towns, national parks, and hospitals are available currently. Supervision, support and evaluation are provided as part of the package. Three-day training is also available for interns.

=== Work experience ===
OpenmindProjects provides a free service to the community by offering work experience to Thai nationals and surrounding countries who wish to further their English communication skills and education in the internship areas listed above. The service provides hands on, practical experience at different levels. The expectation is for active learning. Participation and length of work experience is assessed on a case by case basis and is fully funded by OpenmindProjects.

== Training ==
Prior to teaching, volunteers undergo a three-day training program at the OpenmindProjects Training Center in Nong Khai, which teaches volunteers skills for teaching English to students, as well as language and cultural skills so that volunteers can adjust to living at their new placement. Students practice teaching English alongside other volunteers and the local staff. Volunteers receive an online pre-departure handbook with information on how to teach English and lesson plans. Furthermore, upon arriving at the three-day cross-cultural and training program, volunteers receive volunteer handbooks that include all the necessary information about teaching and living in Thailand, Laos, Cambodia, or Nepal.
