= Campaign for Better Transport =

Campaign for Better Transport is the name of two public transport advocacy groups:

- Campaign for Better Transport (New Zealand)
- Campaign for Better Transport (United Kingdom)
