= Father Ray Foundation =

Charitable organisation

The Father Ray Foundation, founded in 1974 by Father Ray Brennan C.Ss.R., is dedicated to caring for underprivileged, orphaned, and disabled children in Pattaya, Thailand. It provides education, vocational training, and healthcare through initiatives like the Redemptorist Technological College for People with Disabilities and the Pattaya Redemptorist School for the Blind. The foundation also operates the Father Ray Children's Village for orphans, a Day Care Center for toddlers, and a School for Children with Special Needs. Supported by international organizations and volunteers, it emphasizes self-sufficiency with agricultural projects and annual fundraising efforts like the SOS RICE Appeal. Father Ray died in 2003. The Foundation was significantly affected by the COVID-19 pandemic.
