= Children's Organization of Southeast Asia =

Non-government organization based in Thailand

The Children's Organization of Southeast Asia (COSA) was a nonprofit, non-government organization based in northern Thailand that worked to prevent human trafficking in surrounding regions. Established in 2006, COSA operated by developing relationships with outreach communities based on trust, cultural understanding and partnership with vulnerable communities to fight human trafficking at its source. The ultimate goal of this upstream approach is to promote long-term, sustainable social change.

In 2016, it was learned that COSA's Thailand foundation, operated by Mickey Choothesa, had directed funds that were raised through fundraising and from other NGOs into accounts unrelated to COSA. COSA's United States nonprofit then formed a new board of directors, that acted to terminated Mr. Choothesa, and to interrupt fundraising for COSA due to Chootesa's mismanagement. As a result of this action, Choothesa shut down the Baan Yuu Suk girls' shelter. Choothesa at the same time faced lawsuits in Thailand over his personal misdirection of NGO funds.

As a result of the actions of Choothesa, the girls at the shelter were displaced, and the American board stepped in, and with coordination with Thai authorities, immediately acted to place the girls with other schools and homes. COSA's USA nonprofit ended its operations after securing the safety and well being of the girls at the former shelter. As a result of the breach of trust by the Thailand foundation's director, a number of downstream effects occurred, one of them being the creation of a documentary by Shine Global. The film is titled "The Wrong Light," and has been distributed internationally, winning a number of film awards.

== Archived History ==
COSA's philosophy was one of prevention through education. It believes that providing children with safety and access to school while simultaneously educating and empowering target Hill Tribe communities is the key to battling the culture behind human trafficking. Baan Yuu Suk is COSA's flagship shelter, while MOSAIC, OASIS, and PASS are its foundational outreach programs.

In addition, COSA aimed to reduce trafficking stereotypes and to emphasize the issue's complexity by raising awareness both internally and externally. A Forbes article, highlighting COSA's initiative, debunks common myths about trafficking, separating the facts from fiction.

COSA was founded in 2006 by Mickey Choothesa. As a documentary photographer, Mickey spent 26 years recording major conflicts the world over, including Bosnia, Somalia, Rwanda, and Central Africa. In 1998, a photography expedition in his home country of Thailand shaped his desire to focus on fighting the human exploitation he witnessed amongst the country's minority Hill Tribe populations in northern Thailand. Once Mickeys idea of COSA came into fruition, he made the decision to dedicate his life to the battle against human trafficking.

== Current Programs ==
=== MOSAIC ===
In 2011, MOSAIC (Medical Outreach and Social Aid In Communities) was created to address the medical and social needs of the people in target communities. Easily preventable or treatable illnesses become debilitating and prohibit people from working, adding to the economic struggle faced by families and putting children at risk of exploitation and sex trafficking.

The MOSAIC program is designed to address the social health issues faced by hill tribe members. Along with healthcare services COSA provides family counseling, casework, child abuse intervention, and emergency housing and relief. COSA works to develop strong communities with access to basic human rights such as mental health and medical treatment.

=== PASS ===
The PASS Project (Providing Access to School and Safety) was established in 2012 as an initiative to provide children in at-risk communities free access to transportation to school. Within the ethnic minority communities of northern Thailand, access to school can often mean a 1- to 2-hour walk, cycling a broken bicycle up and down steep and bumpy terrain or having access to a motorcycle, which for many families, is a commodity that they cannot afford. Coupled with a lack of financial support for lunch when the child gets to school, and escalating classroom, uniform and equipment costs, sending a child to school within these villages can often be an expensive and frustrating commitment for a family.

=== OASIS ===
Outreach and Special Intel Services (OASIS) is COSA's most recent outreach program. OASIS was established in 2014 in conjunction with the Royal Thai Police (RTP) with the aim of empowering COSA's prevention initiatives and improving its outreach objectives. Through OASIS, COSA works to help find shelter and safe houses for children who have been rescued by the RTP in anti-trafficking operations.
