= List of non-governmental organizations in Vietnam =

A non-government organization (NGO) is a group or organization that operates independently from the government and is usually created to help solve social, environmental, or community problems.

This is a list of notable non-governmental organizations working in Vietnam or connected with Vietnam.

== A ==
- ActionAid
- Adventist Development and Relief Agency Vietnam
- Aid to Southeast Asia
- Aida Association
- AIESEC
- Alcoholics Anonymous
- Allianz-Mission
- American Red Cross
- ANESVAD Foundation (Acción Sanitaria y Desarollo Social)
- The Asia Foundation
- Asia Urbs Program, funded by European Commission.
- Assemblies of God
- Atlantic Philanthropies
- Australian People for Health, Education and Development Abroad
- Australian Volunteers International

== B ==
- Blue Dragon Children's Foundation
- Bread for the World
- Bremen Overseas Research and Development Association
- Bright Future Group for People with Disabilities

== C ==
- CAMA Services of Christian and Missionary Alliance
- CARE International in Vietnam
- Cardiac Risk in the Young
- Care the People
- Caritas International Switzerland
- Catholic Relief Services Vietnam
- ChildFund
- Children of Peace International
- Christian Blind Mission International / Christoffel Blindenmission
- Christian Freedom International
- Christina Noble Children's Foundation
- Church World Service
- Churches of Christ Overseas Aid
- Cooperazione e Sviluppo
- Council on International Educational Exchange
- Counterpart International

== D ==
- Danish Red Cross
- Daughters of Charity of Saint Vincent de Paul

== E ==
- East Meets West Foundation
- English Language Institute

== F ==
- FHI 360
- Ford Foundation
- Foundation for International Development/Relief
- The Fred Hollows Foundation
- Friedrich Ebert Stiftung
- Fund for Reconciliation and Development (FRD)
- Friends of Hue Foundation
- Friends of Vietnam Heritage
- Friendship Bridge
- Foundation for Innovative New Diagnostics

== G ==
- Global Village Foundation (GVF)
- Global Civic Sharing
- Groupe de Recherches et d'Echanges Technologiques

== H ==
- Habitat for Humanity International in Vietnam
- Hans Messer Foundation
- Healing Hearts Vietnam
- Heifer International (HPI)
- Helen Keller International
- Holt International Children's Services
- Humanitarian Services for Children of Vietnam (HSCV)
- Humanity & Inclusion

== I ==
- International Children Assistance Network (ICAN)
- Institute of International Education
- International Development Enterprises
- International Marinelife Alliance (IMA)
- International Planned Parenthood Federation, East and South East Asia & Oceania Region
- Italian Centre for Aid to Children/Centro Italiano Aiuti all'Infanzia

== J ==
- Japan International Volunteer Center
- Japanese Association of Supporting Streetchildren

== K ==
- Konrad Adenauer Foundation
- KNCV Tuberculosis Foundation

== L ==
- Lutheran Church–Missouri Synod World Mission
- Living Values Education Program

== M ==
- Malteser International
- Maryknoll
- Medecins du Monde France
- Medecins du Monde Canada
- Mennonite Central Committee
- Mines Advisory Group
- MSI Reproductive Choices

== N ==
- Nordic Assistance to Vietnam
- Norwegian Mission Alliance
- Norwegian Red Cross

== O ==
- Operation Smile
- ORBIS International
- Oxfam Great Britain
- Oxfam Hong Kong
- Oxfam Quebec
- Oxfam Solidarity Belgium

== P ==
- PATH Canada
- PATH USA
- Pathfinder International
- Pearl S. Buck International, Inc.
- People Resources and Conservation Foundation
- Plan International
- Population Council
- Population Services International
- Pacific Links Foundation
- Passerelles Numériques

== Q ==
- Quaker Service American Friends Service Committee

== R ==
- Red Cross of Viet Nam

== S ==
- Samaritan's Purse International Relief
- Saigon Children's Charity
- Save the Children Australia, United Kingdom, Japan, Sweden, USA
- Save the Children Fund
- Singapore International Foundation
- Sisters of Adoration, Slaves of the Blessed Sacrament and of Charity
- SOS Children's Villages Vietnam
- Survivor Corps

== T ==
- Terre des hommes Foundation - Lausanne
- The Alliance for Safe Children (TASC)
- The Global Fund to Fight AIDS, Tuberculosis and Malaria
- The Library Project
- The World Conservation Union
- TRAFFIC International in Indochina

== U ==
- UNICEF
- United Nations Volunteers

== V ==
- Vietnam Assistance for the Handicapped
- Vietnam Children's Fund
- Viet Dreams
- Vietnam Veterans Memorial Fund
- Vietnam Veterans of America Foundation
- Voluntary Service Overseas
- VIA (Volunteers In Asia)
- Vietnam Assistance for the Handicapped (VNAH)
- Vietnam Friendship Village Project
- 4T - Vietnam Youth Education Support Center

== W ==
- World Concern Vietnam
- World Health Organization
- World Medical Relief
- World Population Foundation
- World Vision International
- World Wide Fund for Nature
- Worldwide Orphans Foundation

== Y ==
- Young Lives Vietnam
- Youth with a Mission - Mercy, Relief and Development Asia
