= Global Village Foundation =

US-based non-profit organization

Global Village Foundation logo

The Global Village Foundation (GVF) is a United States–based non-profit organization which provides education and health care for children and rural villagers in Vietnam and some other countries of Asia. The non-profit was established in 1999 by author and humanitarian Le Ly Hayslip.

== History ==
In 1986, coming back to Vietnam after a 16-year absence, Hayslip was deeply affected by the poor living conditions and devastation there. Deciding to make a difference, she initially set up the East Meets West Foundation and later, Global Village Foundation for helping to rebuild and reconstruct her motherland and contributing to the peaceful dialogue between the United States and Vietnam.

== Overview ==
The main fields of the foundation operations include:

- Education
  - Portable Libraries Project (since 2006), setting up libraries in rural areas;
  - Building new five schools (since 2000) and supplying them with equipment.
- Emergency relief
  - Annual delivery of rice and aid to poor areas affected by drought, flood and other natural disasters;
  - Helping victims of the 2004 tsunami in Thailand and Sri Lanka.
- Health and well-being
  - Launching (from 2006) new Dental Health Education Project (DHEP) including dental hygiene education, preventive dental care, and dental health to the children in rural villages of Vietnam;
  - Helping and founding massage centers for the blind (in 2005–6) in cooperation with Singapore students;
  - Construction of two new houses for the Agent Orange victims in Quảng Nam Province, and giving support in emergency cases for poverty-stricken families (since 2005).

== Recognition ==
The 1993 film Heaven & Earth, directed by Oliver Stone, was based on the memoir When Heaven and Earth Changed Places by Global Village Foundation initiator Le Ly Hayslip, who had a cameo appearance in the film.

The story of Le Ly Hayslip's humanitarian journey and the activities of GVF in Vietnam were also portrayed in the award-winning DVD documentary, From War to Peace and Beyond.

== See also ==
- Le Ly Hayslip
- List of non-governmental organizations in Vietnam
