= Hans Messer Foundation =

Hans Messer Foundation is a charity organization of Messer Group. It is based in Frankfurt, Germany.

The foundation was established in 2004 by Ria Messer in honor of her late husband, who died in 1997. The donations are used to support charitable causes and people in need. In this way the Dr. Hans Messer Foundation, by its declaration, aims to help fulfill the company’s responsibility towards society.

In 2006–2008 years Messer Vietnam Industrial Gases and The Dr. Hans Messer Foundation made a donation to the East Meets West's (EMW) Operation Healthy Heart program to supply equipment (estimated price about 160,000 USD) to the pediatric intensive care unit for Cardiac Surgery at Viet Duc Hospital in Hanoi and medical equipment (valued at 20,000 USD) to the National Hospital for Obstetrics and Gynaecology’s Neonatal Department also in Hanoi.

== Examples of some mentioned projects ==
- Help to the smallest hospital in Hessen
- Noah’s Ark Hospice
- New vehicle for "Mobile Kinderkrankenpflegen"
- Newborn campaign for the improvement of the neonatal intensive care unit in Binh Duong hospital (Vietnam)
- Donation of a paperless EEG machine to the Neurology Department at the Sankt Katharinen Hospital in Frankfurt/Main
- Reducing child poverty in Germany
- Support of the Sena Nursery School in the Gambia
- Conductive rehabilitation for brain damaged children
- Help for children with cancer Frankfurt e.V.

This article is related to the List of non-governmental organizations in Vietnam.
