= Jauss =

Jauss is a surname. Notable people with the surname include:

- Dave Jauss (born 1957), American baseball coach and scout
- Georg Jauss (1867–1922), German painter
- Hans-Robert Jauss (1921–1997), German philosopher

== See also ==
- JASS (disambiguation)
