= Rybacki =

Rybacki (Polish pronunciation: [rɨˈbat͡ski]; feminine: Rybacka) is a Polish surname. Notable people with the surname include:

- Binh Rybacki
- Julien Rybacki
- Tommy Rybacki
