= Lê Khánh Đồng =

Lê Khánh Đồng (1905–1976) is a Vietnamese medical doctor and was one of the founding members of the Traditional Medicine Faculty of Hanoi Medical University and the National Hospital of Traditional Medicine in Vietnam. He was the director of the Nghệ An Provincial Health Service as well as the director of the Vinh Hospital (1953–1957). He was the head of the Training Department of the National Hospital of Traditional Medicine in Vietnam (from 1958 to 1970). One of people to set the corner stone for family to pursue traditional medicine and then the next generation make the Daibio Traditional Medicine Great Family Clinic Company.

== Biography ==
Lê Khánh Đồng was born in 1905 in Son An commune, Hương Sơn District, Hà Tĩnh Province, Vietnam.

- In 1931 he graduated from Indochina Medical University and was assigned under French Indochina to Xavanakhet Hospital in Laos, then to the hospitals in Nam Định Province, Bình Định Province in Vietnam
- 1953 - 1957, he served as the Director of Nghệ An Provincial Health Service as well as the Director of the Vinh Hospital.
- From 1958 until his retirement in 1970, he served as the head of Training Department of the National Hospital of Traditional Medicine in Vietnam.

== Career ==
- He was one of the founding members of Traditional Medicine in Modern Era in Vietnam. He was fluent in French, Mandarin Chinese and Japanese as well as composing music and poetry. During the years 1926–29, he actively participated in the movement of new poetry and wrote the poetry book named "Hands Poetry" "Thơ Buông" for many readers with deep impression. He was named in the Book of Vietnamese Poets by Hoai Chan - Hoai Thanh.
- He was an optimist to see problems in the direction of Vietnamese Traditional Medicine effective and simplified. He wrote the book "Simple Acupuncture" in 1962, translated "The cure" of Japan in 1969 and the "Home-grown Medicine" in 1959. He prepared from natural herbs together with his son: Lê Khánh Thành to create 893 Traditional Medicine Shampoo, Daibio Traditional Medicine Shampoo, drugs to skin diseases as scalp, eczéma, hair, syscosis, psoriasis with such valued medicinal herb original ingredients as Gleditsia, Ocimum, Fallopia multiflora... The book has a great reputation when it provides the easy to understand and close to the traditional medical background to readers.

== Family ==
He is the 20th descendant of the King Lê Thái Tổ the founder of the famous Later Lê dynasty of Vietnam. His father was Lê Quý Bác who served as the Deputy Minister of Foreign Affairs in the imperial court of the Nguyễn dynasty. His first wife was Tran Thi Xuyen. After Mrs. Xuyên died, he married Ms. Nguyễn Thị Vàng who is the daughter of Dr. Nguyen Khac Niem - Former Minister in the imperial court of the Nguyễn dynasty and Mrs. Vàng is also elder sister of the politician, medical doctor, the famous Vietnamese democracy activist Nguyễn Khắc Viện. His famous brothers are Prof. Lê Khánh Bằng and Prof. Pharmacist in Traditional Medicine Lê Khánh Trai. His family has Journalist Lê Khánh Căn, Journalist Lê Khánh Chi, Prof. Literature Researcher Lê Khánh Soa, Engineer and Dermatologist in Traditional Medicine Lê Khánh Thành, Prof. Dr. Lê Khánh Châu at Bochum University Germany who married Dr. Nguyễn Thanh Hoa - To Huu's daughter.

Following the history of the Lê family with the Emperors who making Vietnam Nation as Emperor Lê Thái Tổ, Emperor Le Thanh Tong, the Lê family in Son An Hương Sơn, Hà Tĩnh and Nguyễn Khắc family (the family of his wife, Nguyen Thi Vang) has such famous doctors as Herbalist Academy Le Nguyen Le, Herbalist State Government Le Kinh Hap, Maderin vice Minister under the Nguyễn dynasty Le Khanh Lam Le Quy Bac, Minister under the Nguyễn dynasty, Nguyen Khac Niem, Politician Dr Nguyễn Khắc Viện, Herbalist Le Khanh Rights, Prof. Dr Le Kinh Due, Dr Le Khanh Dong, Professor pharmacist Le Khanh Trai, Colonel doctor Le Khac Thien ... These are the people who make the foundation for their next generations followed Great traditional Medicine Traditional Family for over 300 years.

Lê Khánh family has relationship with family of GS. VS. Prof. Dr. Đái Duy Ban, GS. Đái Duy Ban is the founder Daibio Traditional Medicine Great Clinic Company. Daibio is the group of Professor, PhD, Masters, doctors, herbalist, Pharmacy, Engineering in Big Families to develop traditional medicine for over 300 years. Daibio Traditional Medicine Great Clinic Company has pursued objectives: Patient-centered, science and technology as the driving force, to ensure quality.
