= Hillsboro High School (Tennessee) =

Location
- 3812 Hillsboro Road; Nashville, Tennessee 37215; United States; 36.10656°N 86.81191°W

Information
- Type: Public high school
- Established: 1939
- School district: Metropolitan Nashville Public Schools
- Dean: Amy Cate
- Principal: Danielle Holdren
- Teaching staff: 62.15 (FTE)
- Grades: 9-12
- Gender: Coed
- Enrollment: 1,244 (as of 2023-2024)
- Student to teacher ratio: 20.02
- Colors: Green and gold
- Athletics: TSSAA class AAA (4A football)
- Mascot: Burros
- Newspaper: The Hillsboro Globe
- Website: https://hillsboro.mnps.org/

Hillsboro High School is a comprehensive high school in Nashville, Tennessee. Established in 1939, the school is one of fifteen high schools in Metropolitan Nashville Public Schools. The school offers the IB Diploma Programme.

== History ==
Hillsboro High School officially opened October 22, 1939, with an enrollment of 164 students and seven faculty members. Initially, the school served a rural area. Later population increases, re-zoning, the Vocational Educational Act, and 20th century influences have resulted in changes from a two-story red brick building in a pastoral setting to a set of massive white buildings which were designed by nationally recognized architects. On October 31, 1952, the first school was destroyed by fire. Several renovations have occurred since the replacement of that building in the 1950s, most recently in 1995. The school is currently undergoing a renovation predicted for completion in 2020.

== Extracurricular activities ==
Student groups and activities include anime club, badminton club, Burro Bookworms, Burro Unplugged, chorus, Close Up, concert band, creative writing club, eating disorder awareness, forensics, Future Business Leaders of America, gamer club, The Hillsboro Globe (newspaper), The Burro Underground (literary magazine), the Hillsboro Players drama troupe, Interact, International Teen Outreach Program, jazz band, Knit Wits, Latino club, learning center, mock trial, National Honor Society, National Conference for Community and Justice, Quiz Bowl, Saigon Children's Charity, student council, Team Hillsboro-Walk for the Cure, Women in Science, youth legislature (Youth in Government and Model United Nations), and HHS Habitat for Humanity.

=== Athletics ===
The Hillsboro athletic teams, known as the Burros, compete in baseball, basketball, bowling, cheerleading, cross country, flag football, football, golf, ice hockey, lacrosse, marching band, soccer, softball, swimming, tennis, track, ultimate frisbee, volleyball, and wrestling.

State championship titles held by the school:

- Basketball, boys:2025
- Basketball, girls: 2009
- Cross country: 1962 (individual)
- Football: 2003, 2008
  - American General Mr. Football Lineman of the Year: 2000, 2001, 2003
- Golf, boys': 1945 (team), 1972 (individual)
- Tennis, girls': 1968 (team, singles and doubles)
- Track, boys: 1962 (mile run), 1969 (mile run), 1979 (220-yard dash), 1980 (100-yard dash, 120-yard high hurdles, 220-yard dash, 440-yard relay, team champions), 1981 (100-meter dash, 200-meter dash), 1982 (1600-meter relay, 3200-meter relay, high jump, team champions), 1988 (220-yard dash),(440-meter relay),(880-meter relay) (800-meter run), 1989 (800-meter run), 1995 (200-meter dash), 1996 (300-meter low hurdles, 400-meter dash)
- Track, girls: 1974 (long jump), 1999 (200-meter dash and long jump), 2001 (3200-meter relay), 2008 (100-meter dash)
- Wrestling: 1995 (112 lb weight class)
- Lacrosse, boys: 2021

== Notable alumni ==
- Thomas B. Allen, illustrator and painter
- Red Grooms (Charles Rogers Grooms), an American multimedia artist; painter, sculptor, printmaker, filmmaker, and theatrical showman
- Eddie Hill, former NFL running back
- Kerry G. Johnson, graphic designer, caricaturist and humorous illustrator. His illustrations and cartoons have appeared in several newspapers, magazines, web sites and blogs. Creator of several fictional characters including the teen girl superhero, SPECTRA.
- Harmony Korine, film director and screenwriter
- Wes Borland, guitarist for the band Limp Bizkit
- John "Bucky" Wilkin, songwriter and musician of Ronny & the Daytonas fame
- Mike Willis, former Major League Baseball player for the Toronto Blue Jays from 1977–1981
- Carla Hall, chef, and Top Chef contestant
- Brandon Heath, contemporary Christian musician and Singer-songwriter
- Shannon Sanders, Grammy award winning producer and songwriter.
- Tim Wise, author and anti-racism activist.
- Jim Sasser, U.S. Senator, 1977-1995; U.S. Ambassador to China, 1996-1999
- Bob Clement, U.S. Congressman, 1988-2003; Nashville Mayoral Candidate, 2007
- Isabelle Harrison, Phoenix Mercury and Tennessee forward
- Rachel Bloomekatz, lawyer
- Zoe Jarman, comedian
- Matthew Jackson, Safety for Tennessee Titans 2023 Season

== Former principals ==
- Medford Bowman (1939–1941)
- John Koen (1941–1964)
- Hale Harris
- Taylor Hagen
- Dr. William Hicks
- Dr. Jean Gray Litterer (1979–1999)
- James Overstreet (1999–2003)
- Robert (Bob) Lawson (2003–2007)
- Roderick Manuel (2007–2010)
- Dr. Terry Shrader (2010–2015)
- Dr. Shuler Pelham (2015–2023)
- Dr. Danielle Holdren (2024–Present)
