= Kerry Johnson =

Kerry Johnson may refer to:

- Kerry G. Johnson (born 1966), American artist
- Kerry Johnson (athlete) (born 1963), Australian female sprinter
- Kerry Johnson (The Young and the Restless), a soap opera character
