= FRD =

FRD may refer to:

- Cuban Democratic Revolutionary Front (Spanish Frente Revolucionario Democrático), an anti-Castro organization
- Federal Research Division of the United States Library of Congress
- Federal Rules Decisions, a United States reporter of legal opinions
- Fordata language, spoken in Indonesia
- Formula Racing Development, a Chinese motorsport promoter and auto racing team
- Free Radical Design, a British game developer
- Friday Harbor Airport in Washington, United States (IATA and FAA LID code : FRD)
- Frodsham railway station in England
- Fumarate reductase (menaquinone)
- Fund for Reconciliation and Development, an American philanthropic organization
- New Democratic Spirit (Albanian: Fryma e Re Demokratike), an Albanian political party
- Focus receptor distance in projectional radiography
- Functional Requirement Document; see functional requirement
- falling rate determination (science/technology)
