= Duy =

Duy (Vietnamese pronunciation: [zwi˧]) is a Vietnamese given name. Notable people with the name include:

- Đái Duy Ban (born 1937), Vietnamese scientist
- Đào Duy Từ (1572–1634), Vietnamese poet
- Duy Tân (1899–1945), Emperor of Vietnam
- Phạm Duy (1921–2013), Vietnamese songwriter
- Tống Duy Tân (died 1892), Vietnamese revolutionary
- Đào Đức Duy (born 1995), Vietnamese creative director & designer
- Nguyễn Phong Hồng Duy (born 1996), Vietnamese footballer

== See also ==
- Lê Duy Loan
- Pipo Nguyen-duy
