= Bright Future Group for People with Disabilities =

Vietnamese self-help organization

- Nhóm Vì tương lai tươi sáng của người khuyết tật
- Nickname: Bright Future Group
- Formation: 1988
- Headquarters: Hanoi, Vietnam
- Website: https://facebook.com/BFgroupForPWD/

Bright Future Group for People with Disabilities, also known as Bright Future Group, is a Vietnamese non-profit organization of people with mobility impairments, who work as volunteers for people with disabilities. Established in 1988 by former students in Hanoi, it is one of the first grassroots organizations of people with disabilities in Vietnam, and celebrated its 20th anniversary on November 16, 2008.

== Background ==
Bright Future Group was founded in 1988 by a group of seven university students, including four men and three women, who had mobility impairments. They included graduates of Hanoi National University, Technology University, and Hanoi Foreign Language School.

According to researcher Andrew Wells-Dang, Bright Future Group operates as "a membership network of individual activists", rather than a formal organization. The founding members initially wrote to the Hanoi People's Committee and the Ministry of Labour, Invalids and Social Affairs (MOLISA) to propose the formation of a national association sponsored by the government, but were advised to form their own group instead. A 2009 report issued by UNESCO suggested that Bright Future Group emerged as a self-help organization because university students in Vietnam receive no institutional support for their disabilities, and had to rely on themselves and each other for many years.

From the mid-1990s onward, Bright Future Group capitalized on increased support from government agencies and international recognition, to become what Wells-Dang has called "a civil society network advocating for disability rights". In 1995, they formally adopted the name Bright Future Group, upon registering with the Society of Support for Hanoi Handicapped and Orphans (SSHHO), a government-organized NGO. BFG also became a member of the Vietnam Association for Rehabilitation (VINAREHA).

Representatives of Bright Future Group are regularly invited to participate in national and international conferences, such as the United Nations Economic and Social Commission for Asia and the Pacific (ESCAP), and have contributed to policy discussions, such as the drafting of the International Convention on the Rights of Persons with Disabilities.

== Programs ==
One of the first projects undertaken by Bright Future Group was vocational training in computer technology, as well as English language study for people with disabilities. The project received funding from the Hong Kong Rehabilitation Association and from Japan.

In 2003, the Group took part in initiated by UN Volunteers Vietnam joint celebration of World AIDS Day (WAD), International Day of Disabled Persons (IDD), and International Volunteer Day (IVD) held in Hanoi.

The project "Independent living center for people with disabilities" was opened by the Group in Hanoi in 2009.

In December 2016, the Bright Future Group for People with Disabilities helped to develop a new website for accessible tourist travel in Hanoi, going on fact-finding tours to various destinations. As of 2017, the website featured 22 tourist attractions, eight hotels, and seven restaurants in Hanoi, while also offering accessibility information on Noi Bai International Airport, as well as train and bus stations.

== Membership ==
Bright Future has historically had 20 to 30 active members at any given time, including a core group of ten who are the most involved. As of 2012, the organization was completely volunteer-run and had never employed any staff; most members hold full-time jobs across a wide range of sectors, including teaching, government, business, and NGOs. Bright Future is represented in most of the major local and international NGOs focusing on disability issues, as well as across key government ministries. Its members include paraplegics, polio survivors, amputees, and individuals with cerebral palsy, and most rely on wheelchairs for mobility.

=== Principals ===
One of the founders of Bright Future Group was Nguyen Trung, an employee of the Ministry of Foreign Affairs, who overcame his childhood paralysis to earn a bachelor's degree in foreign languages.

Another was Duong Thi Van, who went on to serve as president of the Hanoi Association of People with Disabilities, vice president of the Vietnam Association of People with Disabilities, an advisor to the National Committee on Disability, and a member of Rehabilitation International.

== See also ==
- List of non-governmental organizations in Vietnam
