= JASS =

JASS may refer to:

- JASS (scripting language), a scripting language behind Warcraft III games
- JASS (charity), the Japanese Association of Supporting Streetchildren

== See also ==
- Jass
- Jazz
