= Rebecca Thompson =

American physicist, popular science writer

Rebecca Caroline Thompson
- Born: Chicago
- Education: University of Texas at Austin; Bryn Mawr College
- Scientific career
- Workplaces: American Physical Society; FermiLab; Saint Louis Science Center
- Thesis: Flowers in three dimensions and beyond (2007)
- Doctoral advisor: Michael Marder
- Other academic advisors: Harry Swinney

Rebecca Caroline Thompson was an American physicist, popular science writer, and Chief Science and Education Officer at the Saint Louis Science Center. Her first book, Fire, Ice, and Physics, explores the science of Game of Thrones, and was published by MIT Press in 2019. She was elected Fellow of the American Physical Society in 2016.

== Early life and education ==
Thompson was born in Chicago and raised near Annapolis, Maryland. Her father was a physicist and her mother a high school principal. Thompson was encouraged by one of her friends to take a class in physics, and enjoyed it so much she decided to study it at university. She was the youngest person in Delaware to get her skydiving license.

Thompson majored in physics at Bryn Mawr College. She moved to the University of Texas at Austin for her graduate studies, where she studied pattern formation in buckled membranes using computational modeling. She worked under the supervision of Michael Marder in the Centre for Nonlinear Dynamics. Specifically, she looked at the morphology of nano-flowers that form at the tip of silicon nanowires as well as the formation of ripples in sheets of graphene. The silicon nanowire tips form nano-flowers when in the presence of different gases. In the nano-flower formation process, the nanowires extend, and intricate patterns of silicon oxide start to form. She has shown that the nanowires extend more in the presence of gold, and that nano-flowers only form in the presence of oxygen. She reported that ripples in graphene sheets can be understood by considering the adsorption of hydroxide molecules in random sites across the graphene layers. The process of adsorbing hydroxide causes the carbon – carbon bonds to extend, which can result in static buckling. During her graduate studies, she became more interested in teaching and doing physics outreach.

== Career ==
In 2008, Thompson joined the American Physical Society as Head of Public Outreach. At APS, Thompson created the comic series Spectra: The Original Laser Superhero. The series, illustrated by Kerry G. Johnson and published by Physics Central, followed a middle school student (Lucy Hene) with laser-related superpowers. These included being able to pass through transparent surfaces, change colors depending on her levels of energy and play compact discs. The comic book was popular amongst physicist and comic book readers, and was part of the annual comic book convention San Diego Comi-Con'.

Thompson contributed research and text to the American Physical Society's comic and activity book for middle school students, Nikola Tesla and the Electric Fair.

Thompson was elected Fellow of the American Physical Society in 2016. Thompson is a fan of Game of Thrones, and wrote Fire, Ice, and Physics, the Science of Game of Thrones for MIT Press in 2019. In 2019 Thompson joined Fermilab as Head of the Office of Education and Public Outreach. The American Association for the Advancement of Science selected Thompson as a fellow in 2023.

== Endurance sports and death ==
During her graduate studies Thompson also began doing endurance sports, completing several Ironman races.. In the 2020s she began to focus on open-water swimming and made concrete plans to complete the Triple Crown of Swimming: three marathon open-water swims, each more than 20 miles long with significantly challenging conditions. She completed the 20 Bridges challenge in 2025.

Thompson died on July 26, 2026.

== Selected publications ==
- Thompson, Rebecca C. (2020). Fire, Ice, and Physics: The science of Game of Thrones. Cambridge, Massachusetts: MIT Press. ISBN 978-0-262-04307-6. OCLC 1083675174.
