= Matthew Jackson (American football) =

American football player (born 1998)

Winnipeg Blue Bombers
- Position: Safety
- Roster status: Practice roster
- CFL status: American

Personal information
- Born: November 9, 1998 (age 27); Chicago, Illinois, U.S.
- Listed height: 6 ft 1 in (1.85 m)
- Listed weight: 209 lb (95 kg)

Career information
- High school: Hillsboro (Nashville, Tennessee)
- College: Eastern Kentucky (2017–2022)
- NFL draft: 2023: undrafted

Career history
- Tennessee Titans (2023); Jacksonville Jaguars (2024)*; Winnipeg Blue Bombers (2026–present)*
- * Offseason or practice squad member only

Career NFL statistics
- Total tackles: 6
- Stats at Pro Football Reference

Matthew Alexander Jackson (born November 9, 1998) is an American professional football safety for the Winnipeg Blue Bombers of the Canadian Football League (CFL). He played college football for the Eastern Kentucky Colonels.

== Early life ==
Jackson was born on November 9, 1998. He attended Hillsboro High School and competed in both football and track and field. As a junior in 2015, he had 39 total stops, an interception, and two defensive touchdowns. The following season, he was named team captain and led the squad with 64 tackles, additionally having two interceptions, one of which he returned for a 100-yard touchdown. At the same time, he won the city long jump championship while competing in track and field and participated at the state tournament. He committed to play college football for the Eastern Kentucky Colonels over several other FCS offers.

== College career ==
As a true freshman at Eastern Kentucky in 2017, Jackson redshirted. He saw limited action over the next two seasons, having 11 tackles in 11 games in 2018 and 15 tackles in 10 games in 2019 while appearing mostly on special teams. He saw his first major action in 2020; starting at linebacker, he recorded a team-leading 79 tackles, as well as eight TFLs and 2.5 sacks, in nine games, three of which were played against FBS opponents. The following season, Jackson posted 102 tackles, 11 TFLs, eight pass breakups, 3.5 sacks, two interceptions and two forced fumbles in 11 games played, earning all-conference honors, being a candidate for the Buck Buchanan Award for best FCS defensive player, and winning Phil Steele's ASUN Conference Defensive Player of the Year Award. In his final year, 2022, he led Eastern Kentucky with 87 tackles and also compiled 7.5 TFLs, two fumble recoveries and two sacks on his way to being named all-conference and a third-team All-American by Stats Perform.

== Professional career ==
Pre-draft measurables
Height	Weight	Arm length	Hand span	40-yard dash	10-yard split	20-yard split	20-yard shuttle	Three-cone drill	Vertical jump	Broad jump	Bench press
6 ft 1 1/2 in (1.87 m)	209 lb (95 kg)	31 1/4 in (0.79 m)	9 in (0.23 m)	4.52 s	1.64 s	2.53 s	4.37 s	7.01 s	38.5 in (0.98 m)	11 ft 2 in (3.40 m)	17 reps
All values from Pro Day

=== Tennessee Titans ===
After going unselected in the 2023 NFL draft, Jackson was signed by the Tennessee Titans as an undrafted free agent. He was one of five undrafted rookies to make the team's final roster. He was waived on November 18 and re-signed to the practice squad three days later. He was promoted to the active roster on January 6, 2024.

Jackson was waived on August 27, 2024.

=== Jacksonville Jaguars ===
Jackson was signed to the Jacksonville Jaguars' practice squad on August 29, 2024.

=== Winnipeg Blue Bombers ===
On April 20, 2026, Jackson signed with the Winnipeg Blue Bombers of the Canadian Football League (CFL). He was placed on the reserve/suspended list on May 10, and signed to the team's practice roster on June 18, 2026.
