= Le Ly Hayslip =

Author

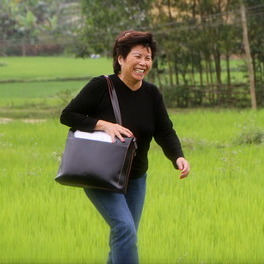
- Le Ly Hayslip (Vietnam, 2011)
- Born: Phùng Thị Lệ Lý; December 19, 1949 (age 76); Ky La, Vietnam
- Occupation: Writer
- Spouse(s): Ed Munro (m. 1969; died 1973) Dennis Hayslip (m. 1974; died 1982)
- Children: 4
- Writing career
- Genre: Memoir

Le Ly Hayslip ([lej˨ˀ˨ʔ lɪj˩ˀ˧]; born Phùng Thị Lệ Lý; December 19, 1949) is a Vietnamese-American writer, memoirist and humanitarian. Through her foundations, she has worked to rebuild cultural bridges between Vietnam and America following the Vietnam War.

== Early life ==
Hayslip was born in Ky La village in Hoa Quy, now a district of Da Nang in central Vietnam. She was the sixth and youngest child born to farmers. American helicopters landed in her village when she was 12 years old. At the age of 14, she endured torture in a South Vietnamese government prison for "revolutionary sympathies". After her brother-in-law, a policeman, arranged for her release, she was falsely accused of leading South Vietnamese soldiers to a hiding place of the Vietcong. Sentenced to death, she was instead sexually assaulted by the two Vietcong soldiers who were intended to execute her.

== Life in Vietnam and the United States ==
Hayslip fled to Saigon, where she and her mother worked as housekeepers for a wealthy Vietnamese family, but this position ended after Hayslip's affair with her employer and subsequent pregnancy. Hayslip and her mother fled to Da Nang. During this time, Hayslip supported both her mother and an infant son, Hung (whom she would later rename Jimmy), while unmarried and working in the black market, as an occasional drug courier and, once, as a prostitute.

Hayslip worked for a short period of time as a nurse assistant in a Da Nang hospital and began dating Americans. She had several unsuccessful relationships before meeting and marrying an American civilian contractor named Ed Munro in 1969. Although he was more than twice her age, she had another son with him, Thomas. The following year Hayslip moved to San Diego, California, to join him, and briefly supported her family as a homemaker. In 1973, he died of emphysema, leaving Le Ly a widow at age 24.

In 1974 she married Dennis Hayslip. Her second marriage, however, was not a happy one. Dennis was a heavy drinker, clinically depressed and full of rage. Her third and youngest son, Alan, was fathered by Dennis and born on her 26th birthday. The couple filed for divorce in 1982 after Dennis committed domestic violence. Shortly thereafter, he was found dead in a parked van outside a school building. He had established a trust fund, however, that left his wife with some money, and he had insurance that paid off the mortgage of the house.

== Books ==
Her first book, When Heaven and Earth Changed Places: A Vietnamese Woman's Journey from War to Peace (Doubleday, 1989), tells the story of her somewhat peaceful early childhood and war-torn adolescence. The nonlinear structure alternates between the narration of her life in Vietnam as a child and her first return to Vietnam and her family in 1986. The two stories are interwoven to show the circular nature of Hayslip's journey, both her physical journey and her emotional one.

Her second memoir, Child of War, Woman of Peace (Doubleday, 1993), continues the same themes in a more linear narrative. Set in the United States during the final years of the Vietnam War, Hayslip must deal with an alien culture and the idea that she may never be able to return to her family and native country, where she is viewed as a traitor. Her tenacity and business skills help her profit, and eventually, she is able to found the East Meets West Foundation, a charitable group dedicated to improving the health and welfare of the Vietnamese, as well as creating self-sufficiency of the people to run the programs started in Vietnam by East Meets West. This memoir documents not only her struggles and successes in the United States but also her growing need to help heal the pain caused by the Vietnam War in both the United States and in Vietnam.

The 1993 film Heaven & Earth, directed by Oliver Stone, is based on her life. She also has a cameo appearance in the film.

Le Ly Hayslip founded two charitable organizations: East Meets West Foundation and Global Village Foundation for humanitarian and emergency assistance to the needy in Vietnam and some other countries in Asia.

== Awards ==
In 1995, Le Ly Hayslip was honored by the California State Assembly award in Sacramento for her humanitarian and reconciliation activities.

== Bibliography ==
- When Heaven and Earth Changed Places: A Vietnamese Woman's Journey from War to Peace (Doubleday, 1989)
- Child of War, Woman of Peace (Doubleday, 1993)

== Filmography ==
- Heaven & Earth (1993)

== See also ==
- East Meets West Foundation
- Global Village Foundation
