= Friendship Bridge (non-profit) =

Nongovernmental microcredit organization

Friendship Bridge is a non-profit, non-governmental organization based in Lakewood, Colorado, distributing microcredit to women and children in rural Guatemala since 2000. From 1994 to 2000, the organization distributed loans in Vietnam.

== Background ==
Founded in 1989, Friendship Bridge was the vision of Dr. Theodore C. Ning, a urologic surgeon and clinical professor of urology at the University of Colorado Health Sciences Center in Denver, and his wife Connie Ning, a psychotherapist.

== Operations ==
In Guatemala, Friendship Bridge has seven branch agencies providing microfinance to different provincial areas.

== Programs ==
As of 2007, Friendship Bridge had provided nearly $8 million in loans to women, and more than 21,000 scholarships to their children, in Vietnam and Guatemala.

== See also ==
- List of non-governmental organizations in Vietnam
