= Japanese Association of Supporting Streetchildren =

Japanese-run charity in Vietnam

Japanese Association of Supporting Streetchildren logo

The Japanese Association of Supporting Streetchildren (JASS) is a non-governmental organisation based in Huế, Vietnam. It was formed by a Japanese teacher, Michio Koyama, in 1994 with the aim of helping street children get an education and a better standard of living.

== History ==
Mr Michio Koyama visited Vietnam in 1992 where he first encountered the street children who were (and still are) rife on the streets of Ho Chi Minh City and other places across the country. One year later he left Tokyo and moved to Huế, taking on a job at the university teaching English. Using the money he earned, he had a house built which was used to shelter children who needed somewhere to stay. The house opened for use in 1994, and as of 2004 over 300 children had passed through. They received shelter, food, schooling and guidance.

The aim is to make any children who join the project self-sufficient by the time they are 18 years of age. If any chose to continue into further education / university then exceptions can be made to help them with funding.

JASS predominantly helps children in the Huế Province.

Mr Koyama was the first Japanese person to be made a citizen of Huế.

== Fundraising ==
Most funds come from Japanese sources. Private individual donations and corporate sponsorship make up the bulk of these with government grants also helping.

A restaurant, called simply Japanese Restaurant, is located at 34 Ð Tran Cao Van. Staff are partially made up of trainees and "graduates" from JASS. Proceeds from the restaurants go to the charity, a little like the KOTO restaurant in Hanoi, or the Blue Dragon restaurant in Hội An.

== See also ==
- Child poverty
- KOTO
- Blue Dragon Children's Foundation
- Street children
- List of non-governmental organizations in Vietnam
