= Vietnam – Germany Hospital =

Coordinates: 21.0284°N 105.847°E

Việt Đức Hospital
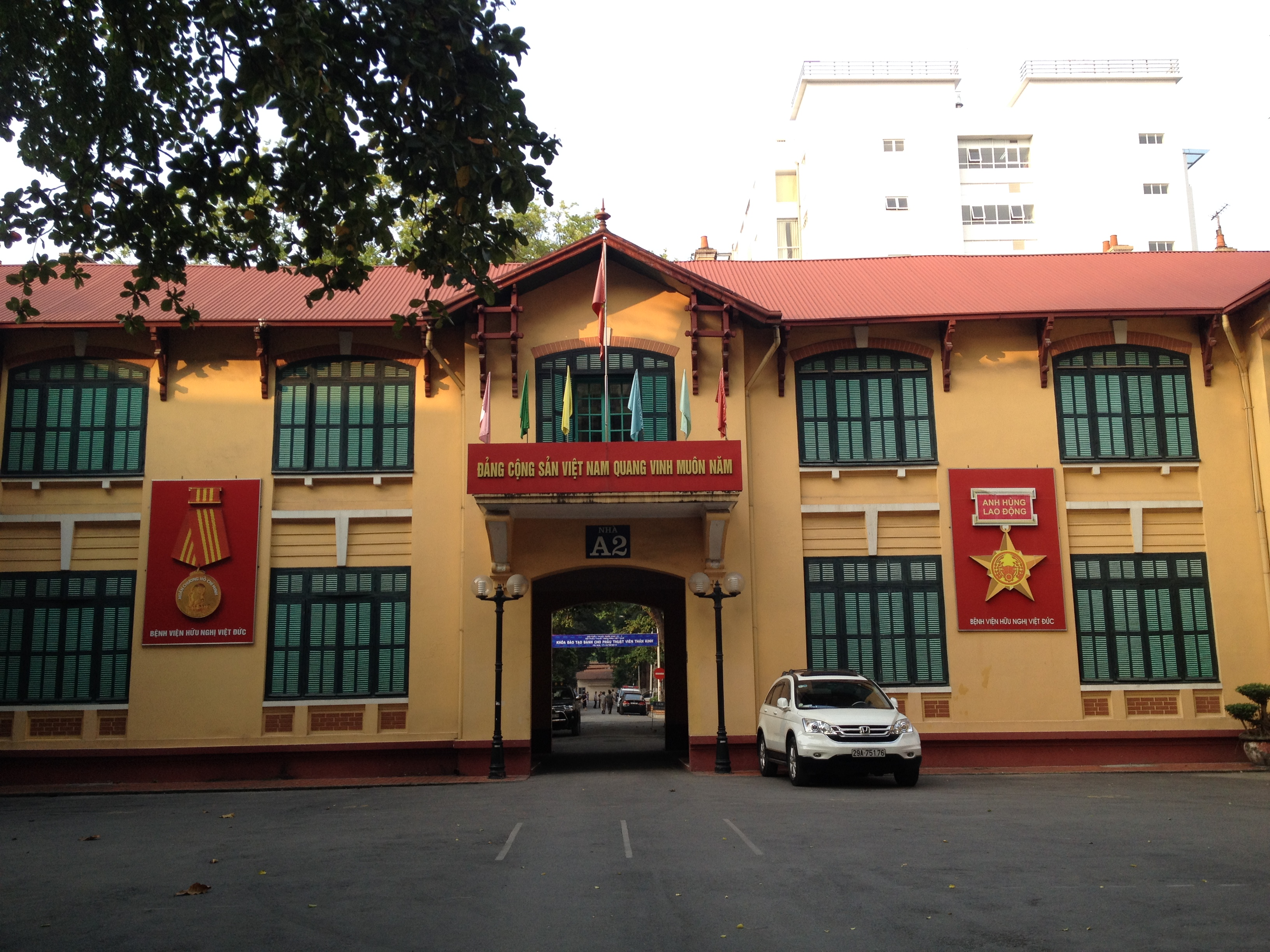
- Original French Colonial building

Geography
- Location: 40 Tràng Thi street, Hanoi, Vietnam

History
- Founded: 2011

Links
- Website: benhvienvietduc.org
- Lists: Hospitals in Vietnam

Việt Đức Hospital (aka. Việt Đức University Hospital, Vietnamese: Bệnh viện Việt Đức, literally "Vietnam – Germany Hospital") is the largest surgical center of Vietnam, situated at Trang Thi Street, Hanoi.

The Hospital was founded in 1904 as a part of Indochina Medical College by the French colonial governor Paul Doumer.

During its history it bore many names: Yersin Hospital (1943), Hospital of Vietnam – GDR (German Democratic Republic) Friendship (1958–1991), Viêt Duc Hospital (from 1991 now on).

The well known Vietnamese surgeon Ton That Tung more than 40 years conducted his research and operations here.

At present, the Hospital has more than 500 beds for patients and 18 surgery rooms and able to perform over 800 open-heart operations annually. It has good cooperation in exchange and training programs with medical facilities in France, Germany, Australia and some other countries. In 1998, the Medicinal Laser Unit was established here to study and apply laser techniques in diagnosis and treatment of some diseases including cancer.

In 2006, Hans Messer Foundation in a partnership with East Meets West Foundation and Dräger donated new equipment of total value more than US$160,000 to increase the capacity for children's surgery in the Hospital.

The hospital has been a site of collaboration with Facing the World, a UK charity that trains Vietnamese surgeons in craniofacial surgery, sends UK doctors to Vietnam to perform surgeries, and provides equipment to Vietnamese hospitals.

== See also ==
- List of hospitals in Vietnam
