= Nordic Assistance to Vietnam =

Non-governmental organization

Nordic Assistance to Vietnam (NAV) is a non-governmental organization giving social and humanitarian assistance in Vietnam.

NAV was founded in 1994 as a cooperative effort of three Scandinavian non-governmental organizations: the Norwegian Norwegian Church Aid (lead agency), the Danish DanChurchAid, and the Swedish Diakonia. In 1997 and 2003, DanChurchAid and Diakonia withdrew, so that NAV is now a project only of Norwegian Church Aid.

Initially, NAV focused on rural development in Thừa Thiên–Huế Province. Since 2005, it has focused on three areas: democratization and accountability in government, slowing the spread of HIV and AIDS, and combating gender-based violence. It works in the central provinces, Hanoi, and Ho Chi Minh City.

NAV started its first project on HIV prevention in prisons in 2001 and later expanded its scope to assisting all HIV-positive individuals. The organization uses the ABC approach and provides palliative care, care for orphans and vulnerable children.

In cooperation with the Football Association of Norway the program "Football for All" was initiated in 2003 to develop grassroots football clubs for Vietnamese children along with education in health, hygiene, and HIV prevention.

NAV is a member agency of Action by Churches Together International and was its designated agency working on relief for victims of Typhoon Ketsana.

== See also ==
- List of non-governmental organizations in Vietnam
