= Đái Duy Ban =

Vietnamese physician, biologist (born 1937)

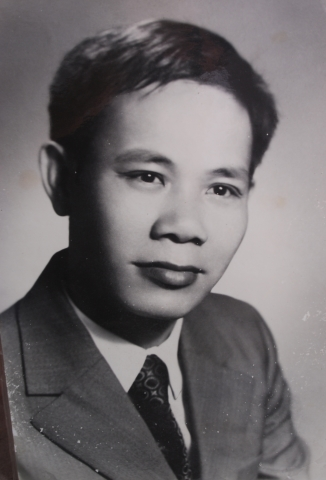
- Born: September 22, 1937 (age 89); Quang Hai, Quang Xuong, Thanh Hoa, Vietnam

Đái Duy Ban (born September 22, 1937) is a Vietnamese professor, academician, doctor sciences, and famous medical doctor. Former Director of Institute for Applied Biochemistry at Vietnam Academy of Science and Technology, he has been currently as the founder of DAIBIO Company and DAIBIO Great Traditional Medicine Family Clinic, Member of Scientific Council of the international Centre of Biocybernetic - Pacific Federation of Clinical Biochemtry, President of Vietnam Medial Biochemical Association, Director - in - Chief of Vietnam Journal of Biochemical and Medical, Rector of Van Xuan University of Technology, President of Institute Research Education and Transfer Biotechnology.

== Biography ==
Prof.Aca.D.Sc Dai Duy Ban was born in the village of Dai, Quang Hai, Quang Xuong, Thanh Hoa Province in Vietnam.

- 1960 - 1965: He was graduated at excellent level from Hanoi Medical University.
- 1980: He defended his PhD thesis successfully with excellent vote from Polish Scientific Committee.
- 1989 - 1999: Director of Institute for Applied Biochemistry at Vietnam Academy of Science and Technology.
- 1991: He was promoted as Professor by Vietnam National Scientific Committee.
- 1999 - Now:

o The founder of DAIBIO Company and DAIBIO Great Traditional Medicine Family Clinic.
o President of the Research, Education and Transfer – Institute for Biotechnology in Vietnam.
o Director of Institute of Vietnam Cultural and Economics Human Development.
o President of Vietnam National Biomedical Association.
o Member of Scientific Council of the International Centre of Biocybernetic – Pacific Federation of Clinical Biochemtry.
o Member of Vietnam Biotechnology Science Committee.
o Member of the Vietnam Scientific Council of Cybernetics.
o Director - in - Chief of Vietnam Journal of Biochemical and Medical.
o Rector of Van Xuan University of Technology.

- 2009: He has been honored One of ten Vietnamese scientists chosen "Vietnam Glory".

== Academic career ==
- He has been known as the leading scientist in Biotechnology, oriental medicine/drug. He has researched and investigated 17 remedies to improve patient's health with 105 books and 305 projects which are translated into many languages all over the world.
- The first time in Vietnam, he together with scientists and DAIBIO Company and DAIBIO Great Traditional Medicine Family Clinic discovered the Cordyceps sinensis as Isaria cerambycidae N.SP. to develop Fermentation DAIBIO Cordyceps Sinensis. The achievement in his life is the anti-cancer medical product. It is the result of almost experiments on thousands of mice. He sets up and also develops the products for DAIBIO Company and DAIBIO Great Traditional Medicine Family Clinic such as 893 Traditional Medicine Shampoo, DAIBIO Traditional Medicine Shampoo, hair care and skin care Xuân Hồng - BTH, anti-cancer, HIV/AIDS drugs, veterinary medicine, drugs for stomach DAIVIDA, drugs for other anti-diseases as (liver, kidney, heart, blood pressure, lung, match...) Functional Foods and Biology Medicines. "We will lag far behind forever if we follow what other countries are taking, but if we apply chemicals and radiotherapy, it will be harmful to body and cause many side effects such as hair loss, kidney sufferings, etc and especially, it costs a lot of money. Each medical treatment can amount to not less than 20 million VND. Therefore, according to the oriental traditional medical practice, we will take advantage of our forefather experiences" he said.
- During the years of study and research in Poland during protect doctoral thesis time, he has found the enzyme alkaline fosfataza on intestinal mucosa of experimental animals. From there, he opened to research some other enzymes in metabolic cycle gluxit to render a comprehensive picture of metabolic changes of the animal environment. After three years, his work has been completed. His thesis was rated excellently by the professors in the Scientific Council, agreed for him to transfer immediately to doctor of science thesis. This is a rare case is almost unprecedented for a foreign graduate student then as prescribed by your country, from doctor to make the transition doctor of science cost at least 10–15 years.
- In June, 1976, he returned to Poland, with Professor Kaviac studied of experimental cancer - malignant cell line nodes in mice. Starting from here, he went deeply into the research field of cancer cell membrane. During four years working hard in the laboratory, his best friends were the electronic microscope and a wealth of laboratory chemicals. He has published dozens of articles for research on cancer cell membranes in English on the scientific subjected journals of Germany, Japan, and Poland. A particularly major mark in this time was that he discovered Calmodulin molecules containing calcium ions deposited on the membrane of cancer cells named L-1210. As announcing this discovery, he immediately received many invitations to work together with the "dream" income level from scientific research institutes of many countries, besides, many scientists around the world sent messages to congratulate him and offered him to share information on research. Refusing to have good conditions in western countries, he came back to Vietnam with the thought that bringing his knowledge when studying overseas is to devote to Vietnam. Professor Deputy Director of the Nenxiki Institute - Poland asked him to write a thesis over 200 pages thick dissertations written in English for the institute's archives, and to protect doctor of science thesis, he just summarized his dissertation into an article about five pages long, printed in a prestigious professional newspaper. However, not succumbed to the notion that it fails to help patients recover the diseases completely because of its only cancer treatment medicine after operation, he was involved in insight to find out the new medical products that can cure the cancer. This product has the name Etamin or AK-96, after many indefatigable studying years, this product that takes effect to destroy the cancer cell and prevent the blood vessel from feeding the tumor by injecting in it has come into existence. After injecting in the mouse malignant tumor for a period of 10 up to 2 weeks, it has disappeared. When the test has been carried out later, the tumor has become normal and no longer had the cancer cell.
- Not only does he devote his entire life to finding ways to save the lives of cancer patients, but those affected by HIV and drug addiction also weigh heavily on his mind. From 1986 to 2006, after carrying out thousands of tests on the chicken, he and his colleagues found the Daisvan active agent that had the role to enhance the immunity and the experiment on the clinical test on 109 patients acquired the positive results. In November 2006, Daisvan and Giabahupain medical products were accepted and incorporated into production in Vietnam.
- Another interesting thing is that although he is a physical scientist, his soul is very romantic. He composed thousands of poems, including the "Hoa Ban" poem collection, "Time and Memory", "Yellow and emerald words" that were publicized. His poems were set to music and broadcast in VTV. He has recently won the golden medal for merits of two scenarios named "Hanoi in the unforgettable times" and "Old Thang Long Memory".

== Researches ==
He has been currently the Molecular Biologist with over 350 inventions about Molecular Biology that announced in several science magazines in many countries. Here is the selected valued list:

1. Dai Duy Ban and A.Przelecka: (Announcement in Japan in English): The influence of starvation on Ribonucleic acid and Protein Synthesis in the Mid-gut Epithelium of Galleria mellonells larvac. Folia Histochemica et Cytochemica 11, 177-184, 1973.
2. Dai Duy Ban: (Announcement in Poland in English): Influence of starvation on Metabolic Activities of the Midgut Epithelium of Galleria mellonella Larvae. Folia Histochemica et Cytochemica 12, 145-156. 1974.
3. Dai Duy Ban: (Announcement in Japan in English): Cytochemical visualization of calcium binding to the plasma membrane of L 1210 lymphoid leukemic cells. Acta histochem 65, 160 – 167, 1979.
4. Dai Duy Ban and J.Kawiak: (Announcement in Poland in English): Nucleotidase of L 1210 Cells. Cytochemical and Kinetic Studies, Folia Histochemica et Cytochemica, 29 – 36, 1979.
5. Dai Duy Ban: (Announcement in Japan in English): Adenosine Triphospha tases on Plasma. Membrane Surrounding Lipid Vacuoles in L 1210 lymphoid Leukemic Cells. Cell structure and Function 5, 211-215, 1980.
6. Dai Duy Ban and Aleksandra Przetecka: (Announcement in Poland in English): Surface Coat of Plasma Membrane of L 1210 lymphoid Leukemia Cells. A Cytochemical study, Folia Histochemica et cytochemica. 19, 3 – 10, 1981.
7. Dai Duy Ban and A.Przelecka (Announcement in Vietnam in English): The studies on the mitochondrial ultrastructure and some enzymes associated with it of L 1210 lymphoid leukemic cells. Revue Médicale 1987.
8. A. Przelecka and Dai Duy Ban: (Announcement in Poland in English): Visualization of Binding Sites of Calcium and its Analogue – Cadmium in Acanthamoeba Cells, Acta Protozoologica 27, 135-140, 1988.

== Family ==
- He was born in 1937 in the years in Vietnam that the district was poor, the village was poor and he was also not able to escape from the law was concerned not eat breakfast then dinner. His parents were farmers and illiterate, hunger from days to months in the home led them to spend brushing the tears that brought his brother "for" adoption of another relative instead of being dead. Until now, although there are many academic titles and degrees recognized by prestigious research institutions in the world, Prof. Dr. Sc. Dai Duy Ban still considers himself as professor ... barefoot. He says that he was born from the stubble; his childhood grew up around the village fields. Rice smell, smell the mud, smell of sweet potato and fish was warm enough during his childhood. Those years, his hometown was so poor that many people had to leave villages in order to beg for food. Poverty does not extinguish the enthusiastic dream in studying of Dai Duy Ban.
- His wife is Dr. Lữ Thị Cẩm Vân from Hanoi Medical University together with such his sons and daughters as Dr. Đái Ngân Hà - Doctor from Russia - General Director of Ngan Ha Corporation, Dr. Nguyễn Lưu Thụy - Chemistry Doctor in Poland - Chairman of Boot Square và Paula & Karen Corporation, Dr. MSc. Đái Thị Hằng Nga - Master of Biotechnology, Dr. Lê Băng Sơn - Post Doctor in Mayo Institute USA, MSc. Đái Thị Việt Lan - Master of Biotechnology and Medical Science at University of Sydney in Australia, MSc. Traditional Medicine Researcher Lê Khánh Linh - Master at University of Leipzig in Germany.
- Today, at the age over 70s, he has still passions of devoting about researches for life.
