= Hanoi Medical University =

Medical school in Hanoi, Vietnam

Coordinates: 21°00′10″N 105°49′54″E

- Trường Đại học Y Hà Nội
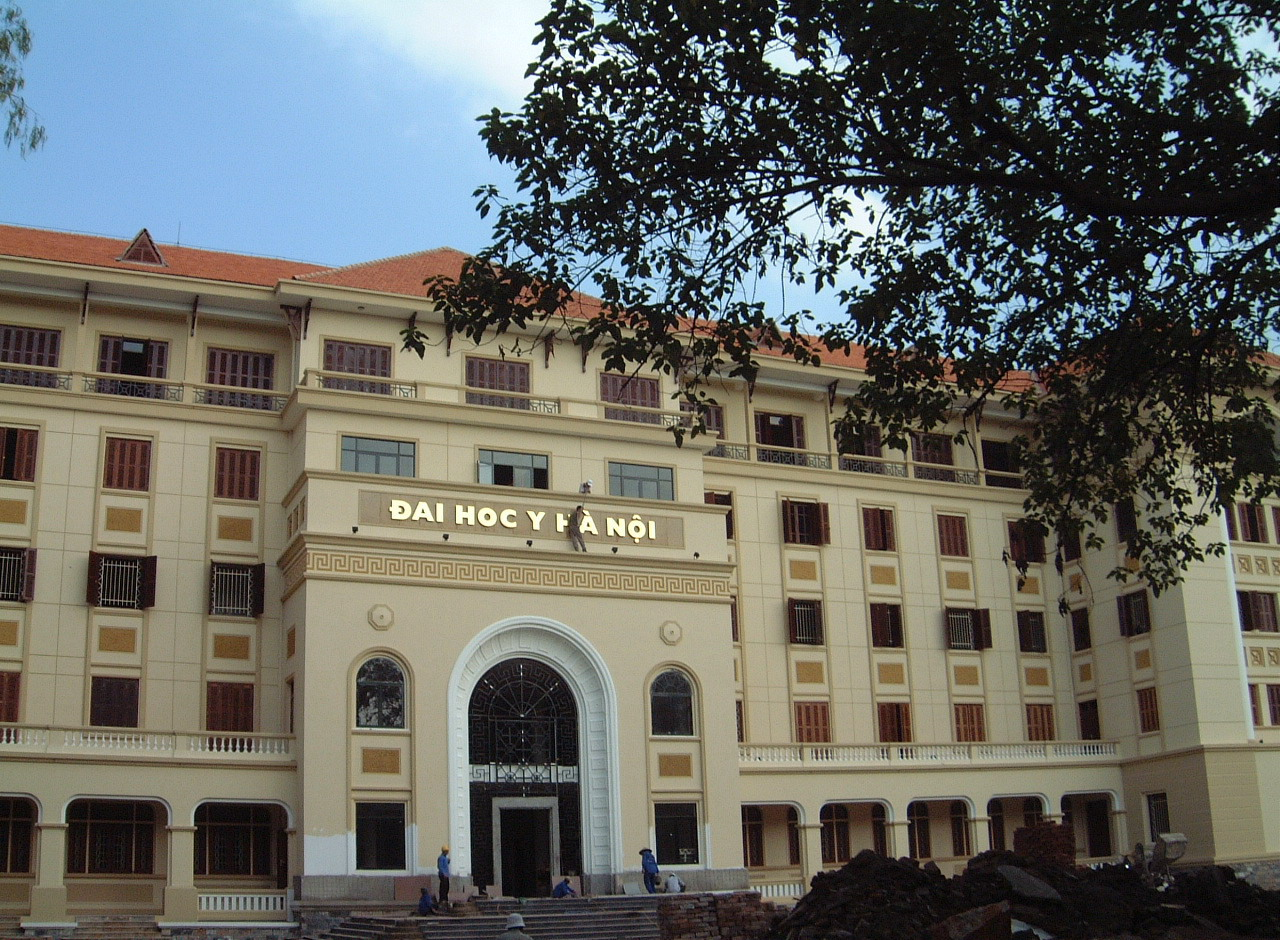
- Current campus of HMU in Đống Đa District
- Former name: Indochina Medical College
- Established: 1902
- President: Prof Thanh Van Ta, MD., PhD.
- Location: No.1, Tôn Thất Tùng street, Khương Thượng ward, Đống Đa, Hanoi, Vietnam
- Website: hmu.edu.vn

Hanoi Medical University (HMU, Vietnamese: Trường Đại học Y Hà Nội) is the oldest university of Vietnam and is located in Hanoi. HMU was founded in 1902 by French during the French protectorate under the name Indochina Medical College. The first headmaster of HMU was Alexandre Yersin who was the co-discoverer of the bacillus responsible for the bubonic plague or pest, which was renamed in his honor (Yersinia pestis).

== History ==
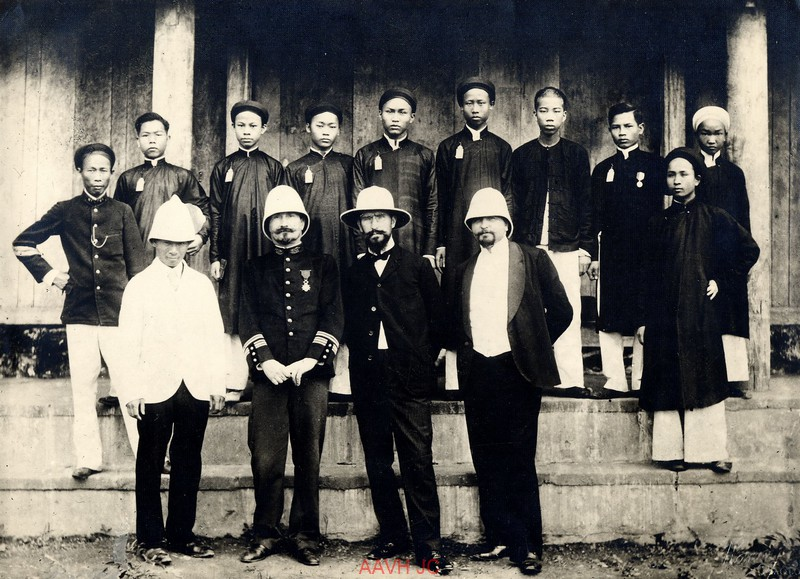
Foundation of Indochina Medical College in 1902

HMU, formerly called Indochina Medical College, was founded in 1902. It was the first modern university in Vietnam, and the second of all universities in Vietnam after the Temple of Literature. It was located in Le Thanh Tong street, next to what was then its practice hospital, 108 Hospital. In 1961, Hanoi University of Pharmacy was spun off from HMU and took residence in the old campus. The site was also shared with the College of Science of the Vietnam National University, Hanoi.

HMU was moved to a newly built campus in its current address in Ton That Tung street - named after one of its principals, and next to the largest hospital in Hanoi - Bach Mai Hospital. It has also offices in Viet Duc Hospital. The list of affiliated training institutions includes National Hospital of Pediatrics, National Hospital of Obstetrics and Gynecology, E Hospital, National Cancer Hospital, National Institute of Hematology and Blood Transfusion, National Hospital for Tropical Diseases, National Hospital of Dermatology and Venereology, Duc Giang Hospital and among many more, its own practice institution, Hanoi Medical University Hospital.

HMU is considered the most prestigious medical university in Vietnam, known for its highly competitive entrance exam. For a long time, it has been the only university that did not apply affirmative action (also known as priority by regions) during the national university entrance exam – this is a system that rewards extra points for students coming from rural or otherwise disadvantaged regions.

== Notable alumni ==
- Nguyễn Thanh Long, former Minister of Health
- Lê Khánh Đồng, founding member of the Traditional Medicine Faculty
- Trương Đình Tri, former Minister of Health

== Gallery ==
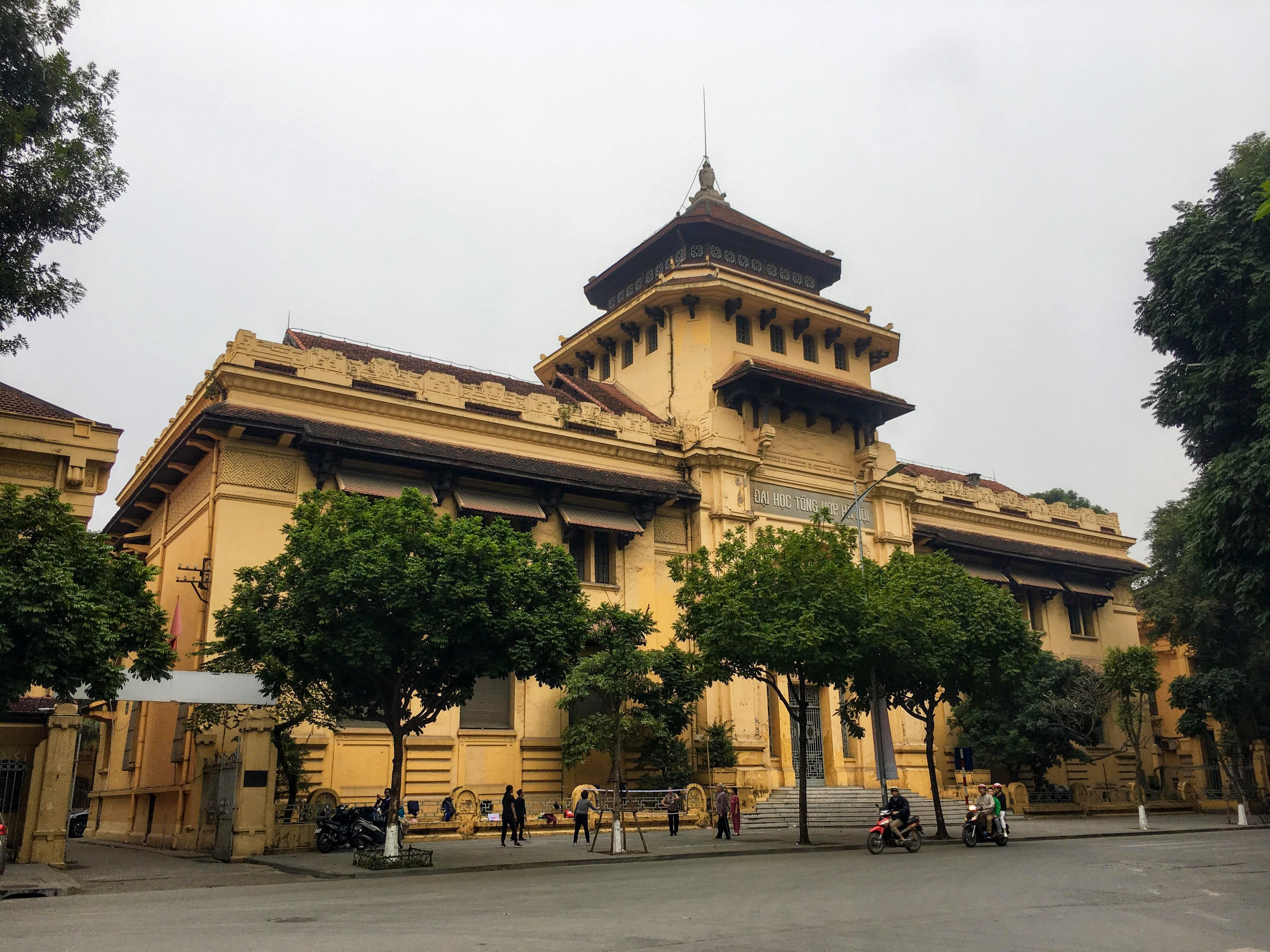
Original building of HMU, now the Hanoi University of Pharmacy
