= Design that Matters =

- Founded: 2001
- Founder: Timothy Prestero, Neil Cantor, Nitin Sawhney, Saul Griffith, Yael Maguire, Ben Vigoda
- Type: NGO
- Tax ID no.: 30-0172078
- Location: Redmond, Washington
- Region served: Africa, South and Southeast Asia
- Employees: 3
- Volunteers: 850 and counting
- Website: www.designthatmatters.org

Founded in 2001 by a team of MIT students, Design that Matters (DtM), is a nonprofit design company that partners with social entrepreneurs to design products that address basic needs in developing countries.

DtM's core competencies include ethnography, design and engineering. DtM manages a collaborative design process through which hundreds of students and professional volunteers contribute to the design of new product and services for the poor in developing countries. DtM has completed projects in health care, education, microfinance and renewable energy. The company has worked in Mali, Benin, Kenya, India, Nepal, Bangladesh, Vietnam, Cambodia, the Philippines and Indonesia. DtM partners include the East Meets West Foundation, Solar Ear, World Education, the Center for Integration of Medicine and Innovative Technology's Global Health Initiative (CIMIT GHI), the Centre for Mass Education in Science (CMES) in Bangladesh and the Mann Deshi Mahila Sahakari Bank in India.

In 2012, Design that Matters received the National Design Award for Corporate and Institutional Achievement.

== Products ==
=== Kinkajou Microfilm Projector ===
The Kinkajou Microfilm projector is designed to assist night-time adult literacy education in developing countries. The Kinkajou uses microfilm to store up to 10,000 reference images on a US$5 cassette. Using a high-intensity LED light source and inexpensive plastic optics adapted from Fisher-Price toys, the device is able to project the references images onto a classroom wall. The device draws power from a motorcycle battery, which users charge during the day using a small solar panel.

World Education, an international nonprofit, implemented the Kinkajou projector in 40 villages in rural Mali in 2004. Design that Matters was named a 2005 Tech Museum Awards Laureate for development of the Kinkajou Portable Library and Projector. The product was featured in the Cooper Hewitt, National Design Museum's "Design for the Other 90%" exhibit in 2008.

=== Neonurture Infant Incubator ===
DtM created the NeoNurture Infant Incubator in 2010 to demonstrate how to adapt an infant thermoregulation device to the context of a poor hospital in a developing country. The project was a collaboration with both Medicine Mondiale in New Zealand, and the Global Health Initiative at the Center for Integration of Medicine and Innovative Technology, or CIMIT, a nonprofit consortium of Boston teaching hospitals and engineering schools. The goal was to demonstrate how to provide the capabilities of a top-of-the-line infant incubator in an inexpensive device. As part of the early stages of the project, students at Stanford University developed an infant sleeping bag that they then independently developed as Embrace Global. In the final Neonurture design, many product features were implemented using car parts, the idea being that spare parts would be easier to find in a poor country.

You didn't have to be a trained medical technician to fix the NeoNurture; you didn't even have to read the manual. You just needed to know how to replace a broken headlight.

— Steven Johnson, Where Good Ideas Come From, Riverhead Books, 2010, p.40

The NeoNurture Infant Incubator was named #1 of the "50 Best Inventions of 2010" by Time magazine. An early "car parts" incubator concept is on display at the Paul S. Russell, MD Museum of Medical History and Innovation at MGH. The NeoNurture concept was featured in the Cooper Hewitt, National Design Museum's "Why Design Now" National Design Triennial exhibit.

=== Firefly Infant Phototherapy ===
The Firefly Infant Phototherapy device was designed to treat newborn jaundice in poor countries. Firefly uses high-intensity LEDs in a novel configuration to provide high-intensity phototherapy. Firefly was designed through a partnership between Design that Matters, the East Meets West Foundation in California and Medical Technology Transfer and Services in Vietnam. Firefly began clinical trials in Vietnam and the Philippines in December 2011. The device received a Silver Award for social impact design in Industrial Designers Society of America's 2012 IDEA Awards.
