= Blue Dragon Children's Foundation =

Vietnamese non-governmental organization

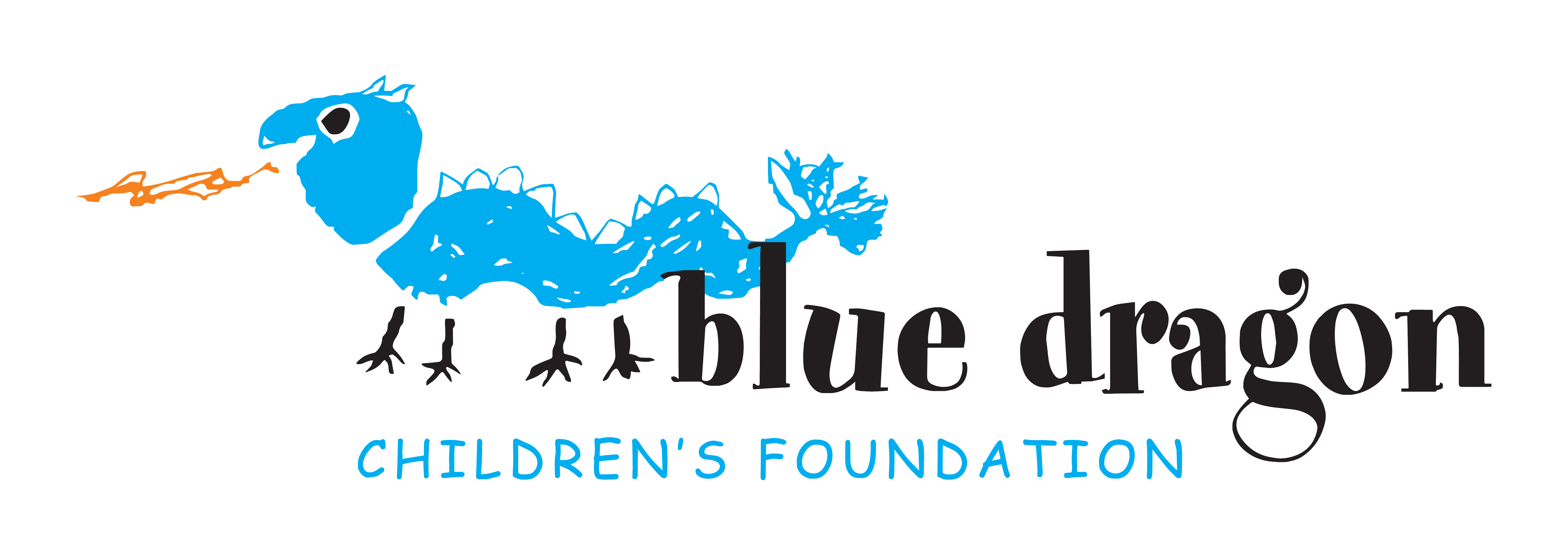
- Blue Dragon Children's Foundation Logo
- Formation: September 2004
- Founder: Michael Brosowski
- Founded at: Hanoi, Vietnam
- Type: NGO
- Website: www.bluedragon.org

Blue Dragon Children's Foundation (Blue Dragon) is a non-governmental organization based in Hanoi, Vietnam. The organization rescues children from crises including sex trafficking, forced labor, and slavery and then provides access to shelter, education and employment. More recently, Blue Dragon has been actively working to end human trafficking through a range of programs operating in Vietnam's most vulnerable communities.

== History ==
In 2002, while working at Vietnam National University Hanoi, Michael Brosowski offered informal English lessons to a group of shoeshine boys. By early 2003, some of Brosowski's university students had joined him to help with the lessons and an informal arrangement quickly evolved into the more formal Foundation.

In March 2004, Blue Dragon Children's Foundation was registered as an Incorporated Association in Australia and in November 2004, it was registered as an Independent Non-Government Organisation in Vietnam.

Initially, the work of Blue Dragon focused on supporting street children on the streets of Hanoi. In 2005, Brosowski and law student Van Ta rescued a 13-year-old boy who had been trafficked to Ho Chi Minh City. Since 2005, rescuing victims of human trafficking has become a central part of the organisation's work. By January 2021, 1000 victims of human trafficking had been rescued. That figure reached over 1,700 people rescued by the end of 2024, Blue Dragon's 20th year, and 2000 rescued by the middle of 2026.

In 2019, Australian Social Worker Skye Maconachie joined Brosowski as Co-CEO and in 2022, Brosowski moved into the role of "Founder and Strategic Director". Vi Do, one of the first children supported by Blue Dragon, was appointed Co-CEO with Maconachie in 2022.

== Work ==
Blue Dragon finds children and young people in crisis situations including slavery, homelessness, and extreme poverty. Having rescued individuals from danger, the organisation then works with them for the long-term so that they can heal from trauma, injustice and disadvantage. The work goes beyond rescue and support to ensure that what is learned on the frontline is used in advocacy to improve laws and policies protecting those most vulnerable.

The organisation also has teams working in remote areas of Vietnam with the communities that are most at-risk of human trafficking. These frontline teams develop resilience in local communities by supporting students to stay in school, and providing resources and training to bring families out of poverty and make them less vulnerable to trafficking. Programs such as Blue Dragon's "Anti Trafficking Boards" bring local leaders together to understand the issues and create solutions that are appropriate to each local context.

== Recognition and awards ==
In 2011, Brosowski was named one of that year's CNN Heroes, and in 2012 was made a Member of the Order of Australia in recognition of his work defending the rights of Vietnamese children. Brosowski was honoured with a University of New South Wales Alumni Award in 2023.

Blue Dragon's Chief Lawyer, Van Ta, was named by United States Secretary of State John Kerry as a Trafficking in Persons Hero in 2014, and the Trust Women Conference's Anti-Trafficking Hero in 2015. In 2019, Van Ta received an Asia Young Leaders Award from the Asia Society.

The United States Department of Labor awarded the "Iqbal Masih Award for the Elimination of Child Labor" to Blue Dragon Children's Foundation in 2022.

Skye Maconachie, Blue Dragon's Co-CEO, was named winner in the category of Community and Social Impact at the Global Australian Awards 2024.

The organisation is the recipient of multiple awards from agencies within the Vietnamese Government.

Blue Dragon Children's Foundation has a 100% (4 star) rating on Charity Navigator and a Platinum rating through Guidestar (Candid.org).

== See also ==
- Human trafficking
- Modern Slavery
- Child poverty
- List of non-governmental organizations in Vietnam
