= Saigon Children's Charity =

Vietnamese non-profit organization

Coordinates: 10.780803°N 106.688772°E

Saigon Children's Charity (saigonchildren)
- Formation: 1992
- Founded: 1992
- Type: Non-governmental organisation
- Purpose: Children, education
- Region served: Vietnam
- Method: School-building, scholarships, Vocational training, special needs education
- Key people: Damien Roberts, Executive Director
- Website: www.saigonchildren.com

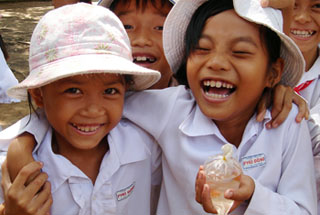
Saigon Children's Charity scholars

Saigon Children's Charity (saigonchildren) is a non-profit organization based in Ho Chi Minh City that provides direct support to disadvantaged children in order to ensure wider access to education in Vietnam. The organisation was established in 1992 and is registered with the UK Charity Commission. saigonchildren is also registered as a non-profit organisation in Vietnam and the US.

== Mission ==
“Saigonchildren enables disadvantaged children and young adults in Vietnam to reach their full potential through receiving a quality education that is relevant to their needs”

== Programmes ==
=== School Building and Learning Environments ===
Up to 2022, saigonchildren has built 222 kindergarten/primary schools through partnerships between donors and local representatives for Ministry of Education and Training.

=== Child Development Scholarship ===
Up to 2022, 43,406 children from school levels and tertiary education were supported with scholarships including fees, rice, text books, uniforms, and extra help (health support, reading glasses and bicycles) to enable them to focus on staying in education.

=== Getting Ready for Work ===
The Thăng Long English and Vocational training School in Ho Chi Minh City offers free classes in English, IT, social skills development such as dancing, drawing, as well as free courses in hospitality colleges for underprivileged students and young adults.

=== Special Needs Education ===
Saigonchildren supports children with special needs in achieving a better life through proper education. Saigonchildren specialises in autism education, including community-based identification and early intervention, and work with speech therapists, physical therapists, and specialist trainers to build expertise across Vietnam.

== Finance ==
Accounts are audited annually by KPMG and lodged with the UK Charity Commission.

== See also ==
- List of non-governmental organizations in Vietnam
