= Foundation for International Development/Relief =

Foundation for International Development/Relief (FIDR) is a Japanese development and relief agency, established under the supervision of the Ministry of Foreign Affairs of Japan by Yamazaki Baking founder Tojuro Iijima in 1990.

The institution, which is sponsored by Japanese citizens and organizations, undertakes aid projects for people in developing countries, including Cambodia, Vietnam, and Sri Lanka.

FIDR is currently engaged in building schools in poor areas of Vietnam and Cambodia. Its annual budget for Vietnam is about US$150,000.
