= Italian Centre for Aid to Children =

Italian Centre for Aid to Children (CIAI) (Centro Italiano Aiuti all'Infanzia) - non-profit organization providing humanitarian assistance to needy children in developing countries.

CIAI activities include building sanitary and medical facilities, first aid units, schools and educational institutions, sponsoring centres for single mothers and women in difficulty, supplying means and help for street children, victims of violence, sexual abuses or prostitution.

There are also a Sponsorship Program ensuring scholarships and vocational training, and international adoption assistance for children in need.

CIAI operates in Cambodia, Burkina Faso, Ethiopia and Vietnam.
