= Heaven & Earth (1993 film) =

1993 film directed by Oliver Stone

- Theatrical release poster
- Directed by: Oliver Stone
- Screenplay by: Oliver Stone
- Based on: When Heaven and Earth Changed Places by; Le Ly Hayslip; Jay Wurts; Child of War, Woman of Peace by; Le Ly Hayslip; James Hayslip
- Produced by: Oliver Stone; Arnon Milchan; Robert Kline; A. Kitman Ho
- Starring: Tommy Lee Jones; Joan Chen; Haing S. Ngor; Hiep Thi Le
- Cinematography: Robert Richardson
- Edited by: David Brenner; Sally Menke
- Music by: Kitarō
- Production companies: Le Studio Canal +; Regency Enterprises; Alcor Films; Ixtlan; New Regency Productions; Kitman Ho Productions; Todd-AO
- Distributed by: Warner Bros.
- Release dates: December 25, 1993 (United States); January 19, 1994 (France)
- Running time: 140 minutes
- Countries: United States; France
- Languages: English; Vietnamese
- Budget: $33 million
- Box office: $5.9 million

Heaven & Earth is a 1993 American biographical war drama film written and directed by Oliver Stone, and starring Tommy Lee Jones, Haing S. Ngor, Joan Chen, and Hiep Thi Le. It is the third and final film in Stone's Vietnam War trilogy, following Platoon (1986) and Born on the Fourth of July (1989).

The film was based on the books When Heaven and Earth Changed Places and Child of War, Woman of Peace, both authored by Le Ly Hayslip about her experiences during and after the Vietnam War. Heaven & Earth was released by Warner Bros. on December 25, 1993 in the United States, and on January 19, 1994 in France. It received mixed reviews and performed poorly at the box office.

== Plot ==
Le Ly is a girl growing up in a Vietnamese village. Her life changes when communist insurgents show up in the village to defend against the forces of France and then the United States. During the American involvement, Le Ly is captured and tortured by South Vietnamese troops who suspect she is a spy for the North, and later raped by the Viet Cong because they suspect that she is a traitor to the North. After the rape, her relationship with her village is destroyed, and she and her family are forced to move.

Her family moves to Saigon and she is employed by a family there. The master of the household misleads her into believing that he genuinely cares for her, and she falls for him and gets pregnant by him. The master's wife becomes enraged and Le Ly's whole family is forced to move back to their former province. There she meets Steve Butler, a Gunnery Sergeant in the United States Marine Corps. When she first meets him, she is not interested in a boyfriend or marriage, having been through so much suffering. Steve falls for Le Ly and treats her very well, making a big difference in her life while in Vietnam.

The two leave Vietnam and move to San Diego. Their life together begins well, but years of killing in the war have taken their toll on Steve, who becomes uncontrollably violent. The relationship falters, despite Le Ly's attempts to reconcile with Steve. After an impassioned plea by Le Ly for Steve to come back to her, he dies by suicide. Many years following this tragic experience, Le Ly returns to Vietnam with her sons. She briefly reunites with her eldest's father whom she introduces his son to, and he tearfully embraces his son. She then takes her sons to her former village to meet her family and shows them where she came from.

== Cast ==
- Hiep Thi Le as Le Ly
- Joan Chen as Mama
- Haing S. Ngor as Papa
- Tommy Lee Jones as Steve Butler
- Thuan K. Nguyen as Uncle Luc
- Dustin Nguyen as Sau
- Vinh Dang as Bon
- Mai Le Ho as Hai
- Dale Dye as Larry
- Debbie Reynolds as Eugenia
- Conchata Ferrell as Bernice
- Michael Paul Chan as Interrogator
- Robert John Burke as G.I. Paul
- Tim Guinee as Young Sergeant (credited as Timothy Guinee)
- Timothy Carhart as Mike "Big Mike"
- Annie McEnroe as Dinner Guest #1
- Marianne Muellerleile as Dinner Guest #2
- Marshall Bell as Dinner Guest #3
- Jeffrey Jones as Minister (Uncredited)

== Production ==
While the script was still in development, the film held a casting call for Vietnamese-American actors in Little Saigon in Westminster, California in December 1991. Those auditioning were not given a script, but instead asked to improvise based on their own war experiences. Thuan Le Elston, a reporter who covered the open casting call, was cast as Le Ly's sister Kim after standing in for supporting roles during the auditon process at the casting crew's request.

The village depicted in the film Ky La, was constructed from the ground up in Phang Nga in the south of Thailand. The hardback architecture of the houses depicted were not seen in previous Vietnam war films, but accurately reflected the solid architecture of Central Vietnam. Principal photography began on October 19, 1992, following several days of shooting documentary-like footage of the village Ky La. The extras were hired by Hong Kong-based casting agent Pat Pao from Northeastern Thailand, many of whom were Vietnamese refugees. Several extras from North Vietnam were hesitant to work on the film given it was an American production, but were convinced to work after being told of participation from other countries as well.

The film was shot on location in Vietnam, Thailand and Los Angeles.

== Release ==
=== Theatrical release ===
Heaven & Earth opened in 63 theaters on December 25, 1993. Its widespread release date was January 7, 1994, at which date it was playing in 781 theaters.

=== Reception ===
Heaven & Earth received mixed reviews, in contrast to Stone's previous two Vietnam War films. The review aggregator website Rotten Tomatoes reported that 45% of critics gave the film a positive review based on a sample of 22 reviews, with an average score of 5.2/10. The site's consensus states: "Heaven & Earth is a well-intentioned glimpse into an underrepresented perspective on Vietnam, but Oliver Stone's solemn storytelling keeps audiences at a fatal distance from Hiep Thi Le's enigmatic heroine." Desson Howe of The Washington Post called the script "structurally clunky" and complained that the film "lacks a poetic center." James Berardinelli noted that the film "lacks much of the narrative strength" of Stone's other Vietnam films, particularly once Jones's character appears. Berardinelli also complained that flashbacks and voiceovers are overdone, although he did praise Stone for "a number of memorable camera shots." Roger Ebert of The Chicago Sun Times gave the film three-and-a-half stars out of a possible four, praising the film for focusing on a woman's perspective and adding how Stone "loves big subjects and approaches them fearlessly."

Handpicked by Stone, actress Hiep Thi Le's performance received mixed reviews. Ebert called her performance "extraordinary", and Desson Howe complimented her "authentic presence." James Berardinelli, however, called her "adequate, but not peerless" and noted that the emotional scenes reveal "the limits of her acting ability."

Audiences polled by CinemaScore gave the film an average grade of "B+" on an A+ to F scale.

=== Box office ===
Heaven & Earth opened in 63 theaters and, for its opening weekend, earned $379,807. For its widespread release, it played in 781 theaters and, for the weekend, earned $1,703,179. The film has had gross domestic receipts of $5,864,949 on a budget of $33 million, making it a box office failure.

== Music ==
The music, by composer Kitarō, won the 1993 Golden Globe Award for Best Original Score.
