= International Children Assistance Network =

US-based non-profit organization

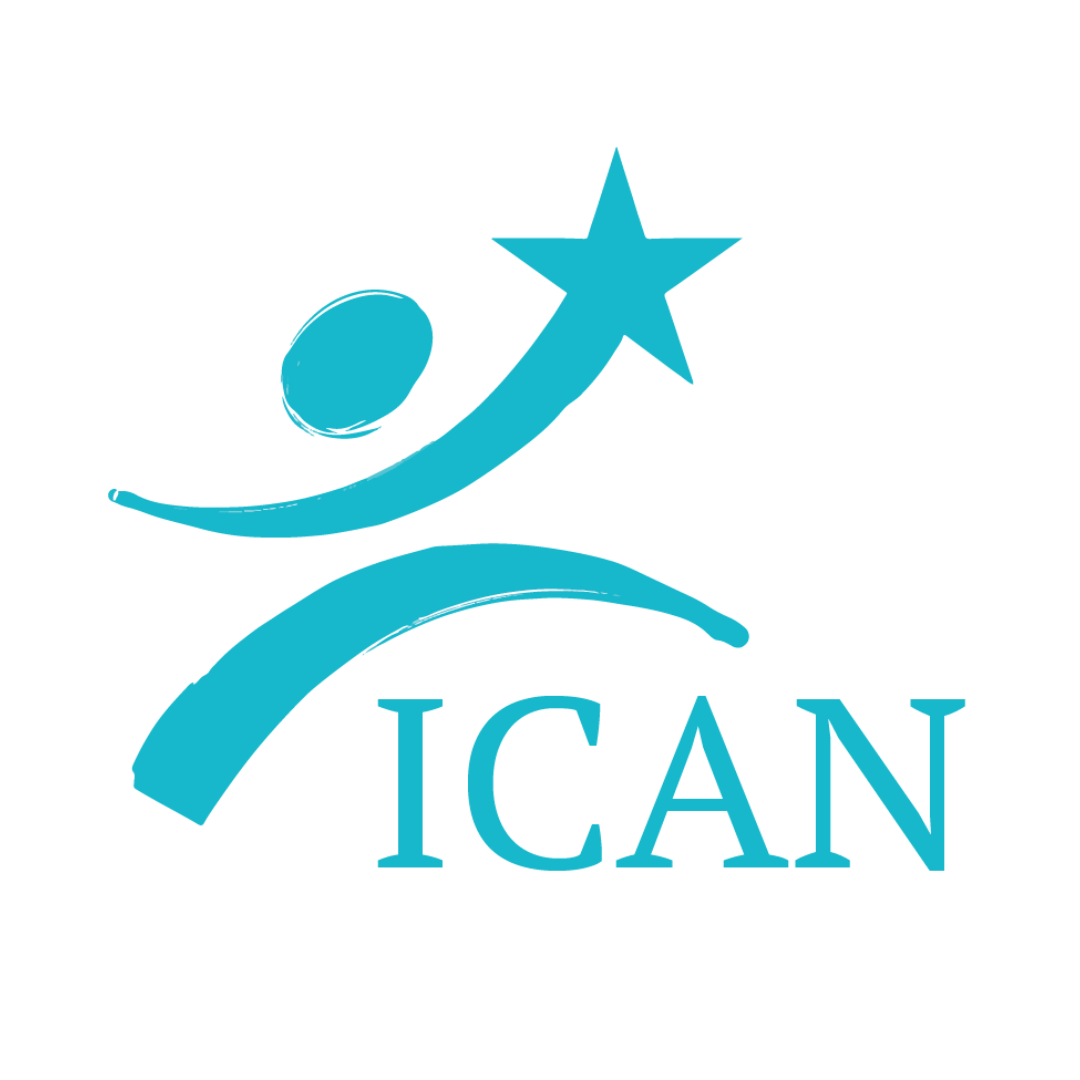

The International Children Assistance Network (ICAN) is a non-profit organization providing help for parents, caregivers and the general population in promoting the healthy development of children from before birth to the age of five. The activities of ICAN are mainly dedicated to the Vietnamese-American community. It was founded in 2000 by Thich Phap Chon, Ivy Vuong and Quyen Vuong and is based in Milpitas, California.

The organization implemented a project in Vietnam called "Strategy to Promote Public Awareness of Vietnamese Children's Health and Safety Issues". This project resulted in total spending of about US$25,000 in 2004.

== See also ==
- List of non-governmental organizations in Vietnam
