= East Meets West (non-governmental organization) =

Thrive Networks, also known as East Meets West
- Founded: 1988
- Founder: Le Ly Hayslip
- Type: INGO
- Location(s): Offices in the US, Vietnam, Laos, Cambodia, the Philippines, India and Uganda
- Region served: Asia and Africa
- Employees: 110
- Website: thrivenetworks.org

East Meets West (EMW), known in the United States as Thrive Networks, is an international philanthropic non-governmental organization for people in Asia and Africa. It was founded in 1988 by author and humanitarian Le Ly Hayslip and is based in Oakland, California, United States. In 2014, EMW relaunched in the United States as Thrive Networks.

== History ==
From Le Ly's early projects, Mothers Love Pediatric Clinic and Peace Village Medical Center, East Meets West was created in Vietnam. In 1993, East Meets West received a grant from the United States Agency for International Development. In 1998, the organization partnered with Atlantic Philanthropies.

BOL formed a major partnership with GE Healthcare in 2011. In 2013, EMW and Blue Planet Network signed an agreement to merge. In 2014, EMW relaunched in the United States as Thrive Networks but continues to operate as East Meets West in Asia.

== Programs ==
=== Healthcare programs ===
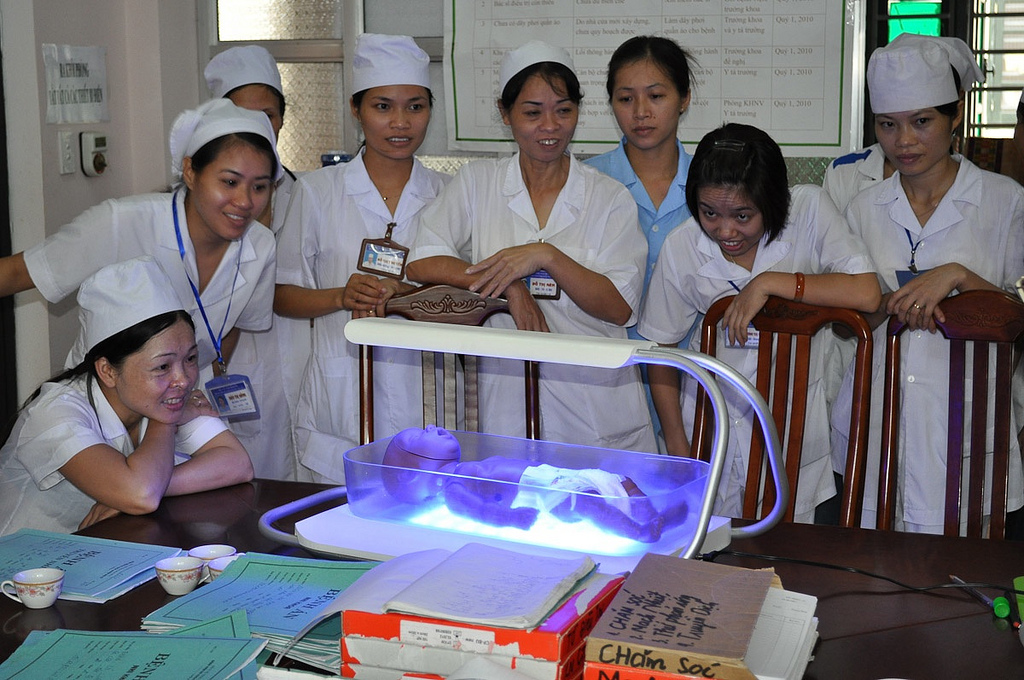
EMW Breath of Life program, Vietnam

The Breath of Life program provides custom-designed equipment to hospitals to save infants suffering from pathologies. EMW's neonatal health model was adapted and replicated to serve Laos, Cambodia, and Timor Leste in 2008 and more recently in India, Myanmar, and the Philippines. EMW builds medical institutions. In the past decade, with support from Atlantic Philanthropies, EMW has invested over $50 million in building hospitals in Vietnam.

In 2006, East Meets West organized medical equipment donations for Viet Duc Hospital in Hanoi. In 2015, Embrace, a non-profit organization founded at Stanford University in 2008, joined Thrive Networks's healthcare programs.

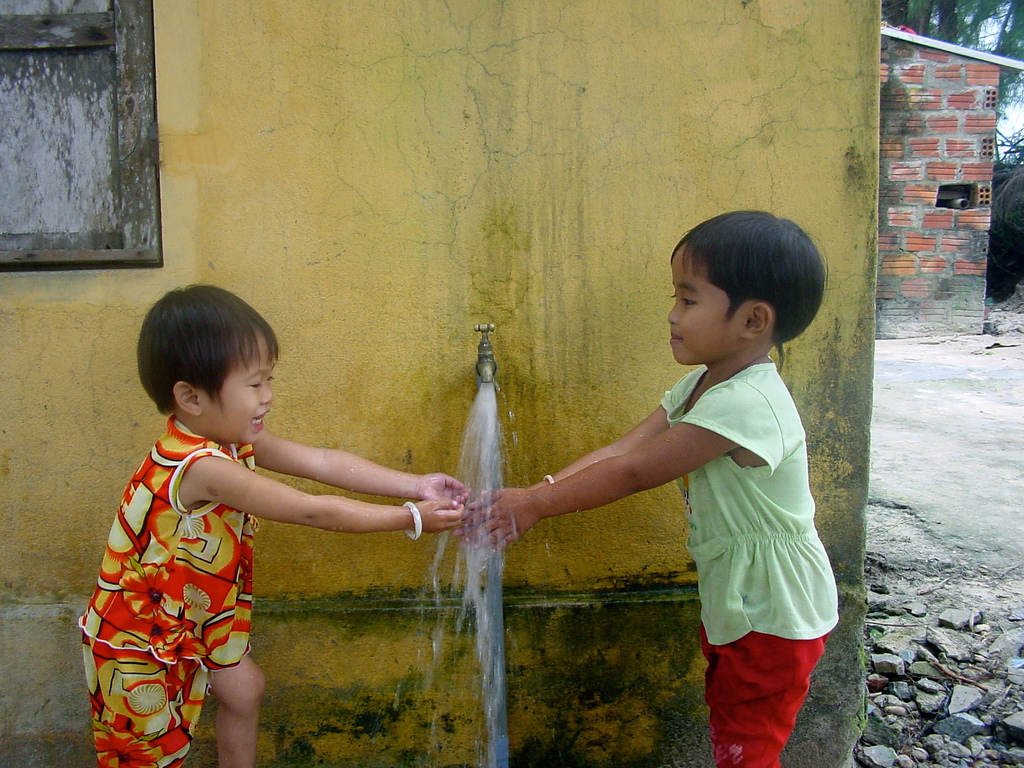
EMW Clean Water & Sanitation Program, Vietnam

=== Clean water and sanitation ===
The Clean Water & Sanitation Program incorporates a hygiene training component. EMW has helped finance the construction of 12,500 latrines in partnership with Watershed Asia and USAID. In 2012, the Bill and Melinda Gates Foundation awarded East Meets West a US$10.9 million grant to improve sanitation and hygiene practices among the rural poor in Vietnam and Cambodia.

== Partners and funding ==
EMW had partnered with GE Healthcare, Design that Matters, Masimo, and the International Children Assistance Network.

EMW receives funding support from the Bill and Melinda Gates Foundation, USAID, the Lemelson Foundation, the University of North Carolina at Chapel Hill, Wellcome Trust, Dubai Cares, etc.

== See also ==
- List of non-governmental organizations in Vietnam
