= Allianz-Mission =

Allianz-Mission is a Christian non-governmental organization based in Dietzhölztal. It is active in evangelization and humanitarian help throughout the world. Founded in 1889 by Fredrik Franson. The institution is sponsored by churches, organizations and private persons.

Allianz-Mission declares its intention to support needy people regardless of race, religion, origin and provide cross cultural relationship with long-term perspective.

The organization has affiliates in Europe (Belgium, Austria, Italy, Spain) and works in developing countries, including Vietnam, Mali, Russia, Tajikistan, Brazil, Tanzania, Philippines, India, and Sri Lanka, as well as in Japan.

== Areas of Work ==
- Poverty Alleviation and Health Projects
- Theological Training
- Education Projects
- Evangelism and Church Planting
- Business for Transformation
- International Work in Germany and Return Mission
- GoGlobal—Investing in a New Generation
  - Year Abroad, Volunteer Work, Internships, Discipleship Schools, Mission Trips, Networking
- Digital Mission

== See also ==
- The Evangelical Alliance Mission
