= Children of Peace International =

Children of Peace International (COPI) is a humanitarian non-profit organization aiming to serve the charity projects in Vietnam and help developing the capability of the people to help themselves. Children were the beginning and still are the primary focus for aid efforts of COPI.

== History ==
The organization was founded in 1993 by Binh Rybacki, a Vietnamese native, who fled from Saigon with her family in 1975 and settled in the United States. Coming back to Vietnam as translator for a group of doctors in 1993, Binh Rybacki was deeply moved by seeing children working there as street peddlers and prostitutes. So she decided to find the ways for helping to improve the lives of these kids and created Children of Peace International.

In 2002, Binh Rybacki and COPI were awarded World Service Medal by Kiwanis International.

The organization is based in Loveland, Colorado.

== Activities ==
At present, COPI has the following programs in Vietnam:

- Schools and orphanages. Supporting eleven schools and orphanages located in Việt Trì, Tranh Ba near Hanoi, Hạ Long, Huế, Nha Trang, Buôn Ma Thuột, Lái Thiêu, Ho Chi Minh City, its districts Gò Vấp and Thủ Đức, which serve over 4,500 children.
- Scholarships and vocational training to children in the orphanages and to the poor children in the surrounding communities.
- Micro-Loan Programs, which provide small interest-free loans to single women with children to help them finance cottage industries so that the family can stay together.
- Hospital Support. Supply of medical equipment, training, and other support for hospitals throughout Vietnam.
- HIV center. In cooperation with the Vietnamese government, COPI built Vietnam's first pediatric HIV center in Ho Chi Minh City.
- Community Support. Construction of clean water wells and facilities for healthcare for the ethnic minority people in Hòa Bình.
- Medical Missions. Organization and sponsorship of American medical teams who travel to Vietnam and deliver dental and medical care to the orphans and poor people of the neighboring communities.
- Partnership with the Rocky Mountain and New England Districts of Key Club International, a high school service organization sponsored by Kiwanis. The organization has raised over $56,000 in the last five years to build a two-story school in Doan Hung, which serves 1200 students and community members.

== See also ==
- List of non-governmental organizations in Vietnam
