= Vietnam Assistance for the Handicapped =

Vietnam Assistance for the Handicapped (VNAH) is a non-profit organization established to help war amputees and other disabled people in Vietnam. It was founded by Vietnamese American Ca Van Tran in 1991 and is based in McLean, Virginia.

The organization collaborates closely with the government of Vietnam and receives funding and support from several U.S. agencies (including United States Agency for International Development (USAID) and the U.S. Department of Labor).

== Programs ==
- Technical assistance to regional prosthetics clinics in the production and delivery of limbs and braces.
- Technical assistance to government and private wheelchair factories in the production of high quality and low cost wheelchairs.
- Technical assistance in vocational training to two national vocational training centers and selected centers in the provinces of Vietnam.
- Promoting programs and policies to integrate the disabled into all aspects of their community, social and economic life.
