= Kerry G. Johnson =

American artist and graphic designer

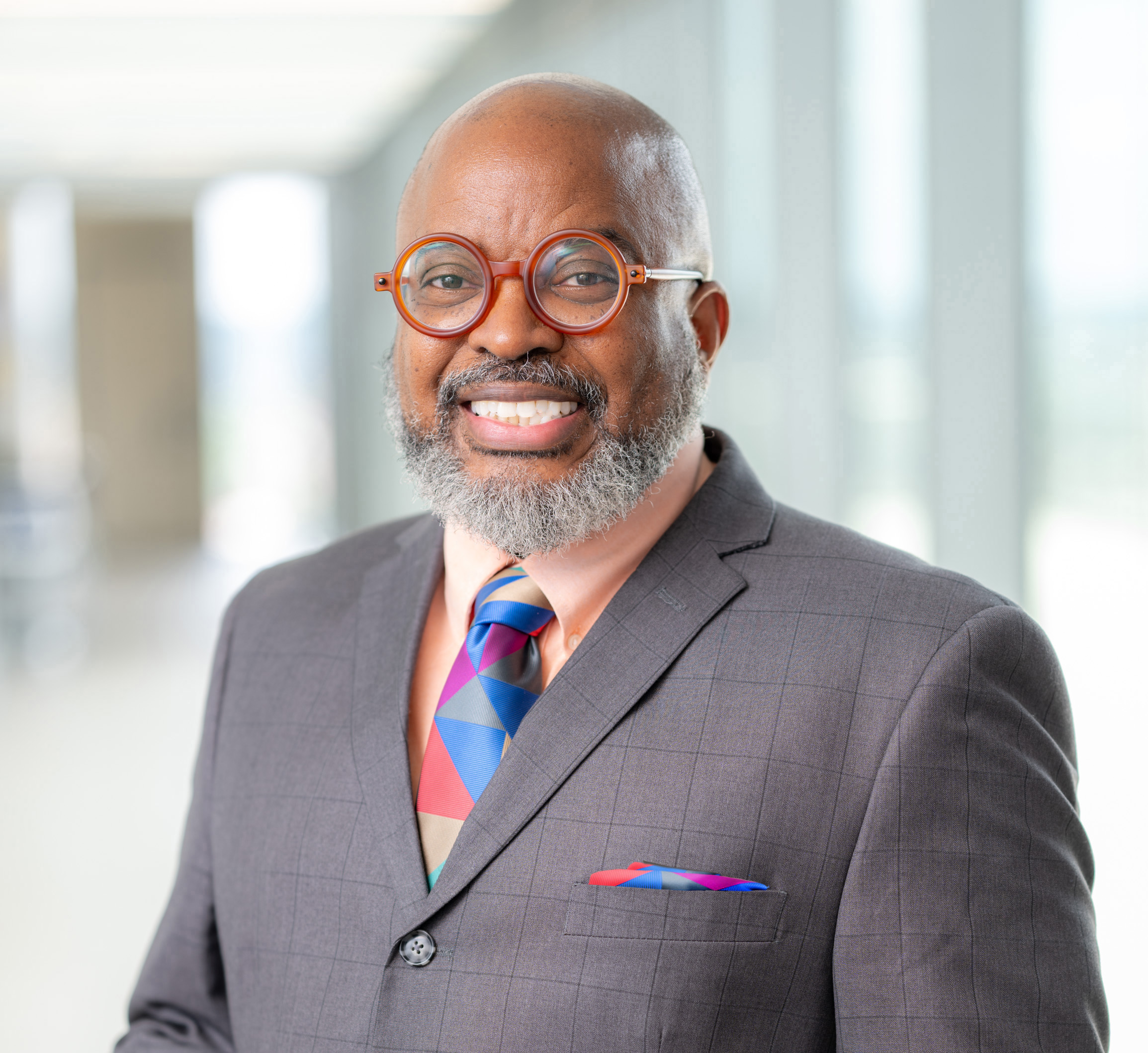
- Kerry G. Johnson \ Artist and Illustrator
- Born: Nashville, TN
- Occupations: caricaturist, caricature artist, cartoonist, children's book illustrator, writer, graphic designer, art director, author, webcomic artist, arts educator
- Known for: illustration, caricatures, children's book illustration, cartoons, webcomics, black cartoonists, African American cartoonists, Spectra (laser superhero)
- Spouse: Tawanda W. Johnson

Kerry G. Johnson is an American illustrator, cartoonist, caricaturist, art director and graphic designer. His work includes newspaper illustration, children’s books, educational publications, comics, and visual communication. He co-created the science-themed comic-book character SPECTRA for the American Physical Society and has worked in graphic design, brand development, and visual communication in higher education.

== Early life and education ==
Johnson was born and raised in Nashville, Tennessee. He attended Hillsboro Comprehensive High School, Columbus College of Art and Design, Ohio State University, and University of Maryland, Global Campus. Johnson is a member of Alpha Phi Alpha fraternity. He currently resides in Columbia, Maryland.

== Career ==
Johnson began his career in journalism and visual communications, working as an illustrator, graphic designer, and art director. His newspaper work included positions and contributions with the New Pittsburgh Courier, Pittsburgh Post-Gazette, Pittsburgh Tribune-Review, and The Baltimore Sun.

Johnson later expanded his work into educational illustration and science communication. He worked on publications and educational projects for the American Physical Society, including PhysicsQuest 2008: Nikola Tesla and the Electric Fair and the Color Me Physics coloring book.

Johnson also co-created and illustrated SPECTRA, a teenage superhero developed to introduce young audiences to physics concepts. The character was associated with LaserFest, the 2010 celebration of the 50th anniversary of the first working laser.

Johnson later moved into higher education design. He is a senior graphic designer for teaching and learning at the Johns Hopkins Carey Business School, where he collaborates with faculty and other members of the teaching and learning team to translate course content into visual learning materials.

JOHNS HOPKINS UNIVERSITY

At the Johns Hopkins Carey Business School in Baltimore, Johnson works with faculty to develop visual approaches to course content, including graphics, illustrations, presentations, and other materials intended to increase student engagement and make complex information more accessible.

In a 2026 Johns Hopkins Hub profile , Johnson described his approach to graphic design as visual storytelling, emphasizing listening, communication, and collaboration as he translates faculty ideas into educational materials.

The Johns Hopkins profile also highlighted Johnson’s mentorship of other designers and his involvement in the broader university community. He has served on the Johns Hopkins University Staff Advisory Council and as communications director for the Johns Hopkins University Black Faculty & Staff Association.

Johns Hopkins Hub — “The creative connector”

ILLUSTRATION AND COMICS

Johnson has worked as an editorial illustrator, cartoonist, and caricaturist in addition to his graphic design work.

In 2008, he launched the webcomic Harambee Hills, centered on a fictional African-American family and community in suburban Washington, D.C. The comic addressed family life, popular culture, entertainment, and current events.

Johnson worked with science writer Rebecca Thompson and other contributors to co-create SPECTRA, a science-themed teenage superhero developed in association with the American Physical Society. The character appeared in a series of educational comic books designed to introduce physics concepts to younger readers. Johnson illustrated a series of SPECTRA comics published between 2009 and 2014,

AL JAZEERA INTERVIEW

In 2018, Al Jazeera interviewed Johnson for a feature marking the 50th anniversary of Franklin, the first African-American character introduced in Charles M. Schulz’s Peanuts. Johnson discussed the history and representation of Black characters and cartoonists in American comics.

SPECTRA

Johnson co-created and illustrated SPECTRA, a teenage superhero developed as an educational character for the American Physical Society. The character introduced physics concepts through comics and other educational materials and was associated with LaserFest, the 2010 celebration marking 50 years since the first working laser was demonstrated.

SELECTED ILLUSTRATED WORKS

- PhysicsQuest 2008: Nikola Tesla and the Electric Fair (2008), illustrator
- SPECTRA #1 (2009), illustrator
- SPECTRA #2: SPECTRA’s Power (2010), illustrator
- SPECTRA #3: SPECTRA’s Force (2011), illustrator
- SPECTRA #4: SPECTRA Heats Up! (2012), illustrator
- SPECTRA #5: Turbulent Times (2013), illustrator
- SPECTRA #6: SPECTRA’s Quantum Leap (2014), illustrator
- Color Me Physics, illustrator

SELECTED AWARDS AND RECOGNITION

During his career in illustration, journalism, and graphic design, Johnson has received recognition from professional journalism and design organizations.

His honors include the Golden Quill Awards, the Society for News Design, the Robert L. Vann Media Awards, the National Association of Black Journalists, the Glyph Comics Awards, and Graphic Design USA.

Johnson’s work on SPECTRA also received recognition within the comics community, including a Glyph Comics Awards nomination.

COMMUNITY AND UNIVERSITY ENGAGEMENT

Beyond his professional design work, Johnson has participated in university and community organizations focused on professional development, mentorship, communication, and inclusion.

At Johns Hopkins University, he has served on the Staff Advisory Council and as communications director for the Black Faculty & Staff Association. His work with BFSA includes using visual communication and design to strengthen the organization’s visibility and engagement across the university.

DESIGN PHILOSOPHY

Johnson has described himself as a visual storyteller whose creative process begins with listening and understanding the intended audience. His approach emphasizes using design to communicate complex ideas clearly rather than treating graphic design primarily as decoration.

In his work with faculty, Johnson combines illustration, graphic design, and visual storytelling to develop educational materials that support teaching and student engagement. He has also emphasized representation and inclusive visual communication as elements of effective design.

CAREER MILESTONES

Other career milestones include serving as a senior graphic designer at Johns Hopkins University in Baltimore, Maryland, and working as an adjunct professor at the Maryland Institute College of Art (MICA), also in Baltimore.

He has worked for various news outlets including:

- The Baltimore Sun
- Pittsburgh Post-Gazette
- Pittsburgh Tribune-Review

== Johnson's Judge Ketanji Brown Jackson caricature ==
In April 2022, Kerry G. Johnson designed a digital caricature illustration honoring Judge Ketanji Brown Jackson and her historic confirmation to the U.S. Supreme Court. The popular caricature by the artist became widely shared and reproduced on the internet. Kerry G. Johnson retains the copyright to the artwork © 2022 - All Rights Reserved

In 2005, he illustrated a coloring book about famous physicists for the American Physical Society. That same year, he designed the official logo for the American Physical Society.

In May 2008, he debuted his webcomic, Harambee Hills. Harambee Hills is a diverse webcomic that follows the life observations of Gerard and those of his modern African-American family, co-workers and wacky neighbors of Harambee Hills, a fictional suburban neighborhood outside Washington, D.C. The webcomic’s characters often provided commentary on pop culture, entertainment, sports and top news stories.

He co-created the science-based teen superhero SPECTRA. Spectra, the main character, is also the mascot for Laserfest 2010, a yearlong celebration of the 50th anniversary of the laser. In 2011, Johnson worked with writer Rebecca Thompson and published their third comic book, Spectra, The Original Laserfest Superhero, for the PhysicsCentral.com web site.

In August 2018, he was interviewed by Al Jazeera America regarding the 50th birthday of Peanuts comic strip. Franklin and he provided commentary on the status of modern-day African-American cartoonists.

== List of contributions ==
His cartoons, illustrations, and graphics have appeared in these newspapers:

- The Nashville Banner (defunct newspaper)
- Columbus Dispatch (Ohio)
- North Hills News Record (Warrendale, PA)
- Valley News Dispatch (Tarentum, PA)
- New Pittsburgh Courier
- Pittsburgh Post-Gazette
- Pittsburgh Tribune-Review
- Greensburg Tribune-Review
- The Baltimore Sun
- The Baltimore Examiner
- The Los Angeles Times
- Chicago Tribune
- N.Y. Newsday
- American Physical Society News
- The Muskegon Tribune (Michigan)

== Awards and honors ==
Kerry G. Johnson has won over 30 Awards for his work in graphic design, illustration, and community service, including:

- 2026, Career Profile: Johns Hopkins University - The Creative Connector: Kerry G. Johnson
- 2023, Career Profile: PrintTalk Blog - Adaptive Art: Kerry G. Johnson’s World of Graphic Design
- 2023, Alpha Man of Merit | Howard County (Maryland) Chapter
- 2012, Graphic Design Magazine (GD USA) Award for InHouse Design
- 2010, Glyph Comics Awards nominated in the Rising Star category, presented by the East Coast Black Age of Comics Convention (ECBACC)
- 2008, first place: the National Arts Program for Illustration
- 2002, 2001, 1996, first place: Press Club of Western Pennsylvania’s Golden Quill Award for News Illustration
- 2002, Society for News Design Award of Excellence for Photo illustration
- 2001, judge: Pittsburgh’s 2001 ARTWorks Competition
- 2001, 1998, 1994, 1993, first place: Pittsburgh Black Media Federation’s Robert L. Vann Award for Feature Illustration
- 2000, second place: National Newspaper Publishers Association’s Heritage Award for Editorial Cartooning
- 1996, first place: National Association of Black Journalists NABJ Award for Art and Design
- 1994, first place: Pennsylvania Newspaper Publishers Association’s Award for Graphic Illustration

He is a member of Alpha Phi Alpha (ΑΦΑ) fraternity, the National Cartoonists Society (NCS), the Society of Children's Book Writers and Illustrators (SCBWI), the National Association of Black Journalists (NABJ), the National Caricaturist Network, American Institute of Graphic Arts (AIGA)

He currently lives in Columbia, Maryland.

== Books ==
- Is He Still There? by Monet Clements (illustrator) 2020
- I Am Love: A Book About The Meaning of Love by Alero Afejuku (illustrator) 2020
- Little Brown Baby Nursery Rhymes (illustrator) 2020
- Believing In Myself! by Erica Pullen (illustrator) 2018
- Princess Tyler Meets the Big Storytelling Fsiry (illustrator) 2015
- You Can't Move an Elephant in One Day (illustrator) 2012
- Soap & Bubbles (illustrator) 2012
- PhysicsQuest 2008: Nikola Tesla and the Electric Fair (illustrator) 2008
- SPECTRA #1: The American Physical Society introduces, SPECTRA (illustrator) 2009
- SPECTRA #2: SPECTRA'S Power (illustrator) 2010
- SPECTRA #3: SPECTRA'S Force (illustrator) 2011
- SPECTRA #4: SPECTRA Heats Up! (illustrator) 2012
- SPECTRA #5: SPECTRA Turbulent Times (illustrator) 2013
- SPECTRA #6: SPECTRA'S Quantum Leap (illustrator) 2014
- Color Me Physics Coloring Book, First Edition Illustrated by Kerry G. Johnson; text by Alan Chodos, PhD, Jessica Clark, PhD and Kendra Rand (2007)
