= When Heaven and Earth Changed Places =

1989 memoir by Le Ly Hayslip

- First edition
- Author: Le Ly Hayslip with Jay Wurts
- Language: English
- Genre: Memoir
- Publisher: Doubleday
- Publication date: April 29, 1989
- Publication place: United States
- Media type: Print (Hardback & Paperback)
- Pages: 368 pp (hardcover)
- ISBN: 0-385-24758-3
- OCLC: 18989662
- Dewey Decimal: 959.704/38 B 19
- LC Class: DS556.93.H39 A3 1989

When Heaven and Earth Changed Places is a 1989 memoir by Le Ly Hayslip about her childhood during the Vietnam War, her escape to the United States, and her return to visit Vietnam 16 years later. The Oliver Stone film Heaven & Earth was based on the memoir.

== Plot summary ==
The story began during Hayslip's childhood in a small village in central Vietnam, named Ky La. Her village was along the fault line between the north and south of Vietnam, with shifting allegiances in the village leading to constant tension. She and her friends worked as lookout for the northern Vietcong. The South Vietnam learned of her work, arrested and tortured her. After Hayslip was released from prison, however, the Vietcong no longer trusted her and sentenced her to death. At the age of fourteen, two soldiers threatened to kill her in the forest. Once they arrived, both men decided to rape her instead.

She fled to Da Nang where she worked as a maid, a black-market vendor, a waitress, a hospital worker and even a prostitute. While working for a wealthy Vietnamese family with her mother in Saigon, Hayslip had a few sexual encounters with the landlord, Anh, and discovered she was pregnant. She gave birth to a baby son at the age of fifteen. Several years later, she married an American contractor named Ed Munro and gave birth to another son. Hayslip left for San Diego, California in 1970, shortly after her 20th birthday.

Hayslip's entire family was torn apart by the war: one brother fled to Hanoi, and did not see his family again for 20 years. Another brother was killed by a land mine. The Vietcong pressured her father to force Hayslip to become a saboteur. Rather than give into the pressure, he committed suicide.

The memoir alternates between her childhood in Vietnam, and her return in 1986, to visit the friends and family she had not seen for so long. In Vietnam she was reunited with the father of her first child, her sisters, brother, and her mother. Her family was afraid to be seen with her because the tensions from the war were still present. Her memoir concludes with a plea for an end to the enmity between the Vietnamese and Americans.

== Critical reception ==
Hayslip's memoir was hailed as a previously neglected look at the war from the perspective of the Vietnamese peasants whose lives were upended. A review in The Washington Post wrote that, "to Americans, almost always, the peasants of Vietnam were part of the scenery of the war, no more."

The book was also praised for its message about the horrors of war. A review by Pulitzer Prize-winning writer David K. Shipler for The New York Times wrote "If Hollywood has the courage to turn this book into a movie, then we Americans might finally have a chance to come to terms with the tragedy in Vietnam." The Washington Post reviewer wrote: "It should not be missed by anyone -- especially anyone who still thinks there is anything noble or glorious about war."

== Publication history ==
The memoir was first published in April 1989, with a tie-in edition to accompany the release of the film Heaven & Earth in 1993.

== Film adaptation ==
Oliver Stone read her memoir when it was published in 1989 and felt that his look at the Vietnam War was incomplete without telling the story from the perspective of the Vietnamese. He optioned the book and the film was released in 1993. The film version was also based in part on Hayslip's second book, Child of War, Woman of Peace, about her adaptation to life in the United States.
