= Van Xuan University of Technology =

Private university in Cửa Lò, Nghệ An, Vietnam

Coordinates: 18°47′22″N 105°43′01″E

- Official Logo
- Type: Technical University (Private)
- Established: 2008
- Rector: Dr. Nguyen Lưu Thuy
- Location: 103 Nguyen Sinh Cung Ave, Cửa Lò, Nghệ An, Vietnam
- Language: Vietnamese
- Colours: blue, white, yellow
- Website: www.vxut.edu.vn

Van Xuan University of Technology (Vietnamese: Trường Đại học Công nghệ Vạn Xuân, abbreviated as VXUT) is a Vietnamese private university established in 2008, under the Decision No 1068/QD-TTg by the Prime Minister of Vietnam. Its main campus is in Cua Lo District, Nghe An, Vietnam. The second campus locates at Km 2, Lenin Avenue, Vinh city, Nghe An, Vietnam.

== Fields of education ==
Graduate

1. Master of Business Administration

Undergraduate

1. Bio-Technology
2. Business Administration
3. Hotel Management
4. Accounting & Auditing
5. English
6. Information Technology
7. Construction
8. Banking & Finance

== Faculties ==
1. General Education
2. Bio-Technology Faculty
3. Banking, Finance Faculty
4. Business Management Faculty
5. Accounting Faculty
6. Information Technology Faculty
7. Construction Faculty
8. Foreign Language and International Study Faculty

== See also ==
- List of universities in Vietnam
- Education in Vietnam
- Ministry of Education and Training, Vietnam
