= Hanoi University of Pharmacy =

- Đại học Dược Hà Nội
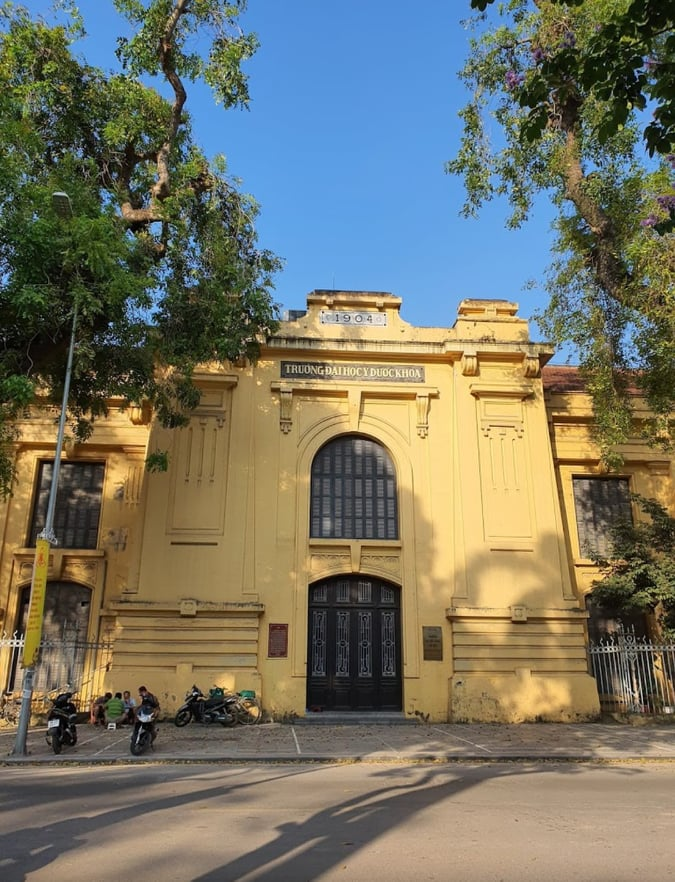
- Type: Public
- Established: 1902
- Location: 13 - 15 Lê Thánh Tông, phường Phan Chu Trinh, Hoàn Kiếm district Hanoi, Vietnam; 21.0216°N 105.8581°E
- Website: www.hup.edu.vn

Hanoi University of Pharmacy, formerly Indochina Medicine School, located in Hanoi, Vietnam, was established by decree of the French government signed by Indochina General Governor Paul Doumer on 8 January 1902. The school was responsible for training doctors, Indochina pharmacists and research in tropical diseases.

This building was home to the country's first business school.

On 29 September 1961, the Ministry of Health issued Decision No. 828/BYT/QD to split Hanoi College of Medicine - Pharmacy into two schools: Hanoi Medical College and Hanoi College of Pharmacy. The rector and Party Committee Secretary was pharmacist Vu Cong Thuyet; vice-rector was Professor Truong Cong Quyen. In 1985, Hanoi College of Pharmacy became Hanoi University of Pharmacy.
