= Fund for Reconciliation and Development =

- Formation: 1985
- Tax ID no.: 23-2569447
- Website: www.ffrd.org

Fund for Reconciliation and Development Is a non-profit organization supporting efforts for reconciliation between the United States and Vietnam, Cambodia, Laos, and Cuba, as well as the development of these countries. It was established in 1985 as a US-Indochina Reconciliation Project (USIRP), which ensued from the American Friends Service Committee, a Quaker program.

The organization aims at reaching fully normal diplomatic, cultural, educational, and economic relations between the United States and the above-mentioned countries.

== Latest projects ==
- Mobilizing support for ratification of the trade agreement with Laos.
- Sending observers to the Cambodian national election in July 2003.
- Educating the American people and officials about the unmet moral responsibility for legacies of war such as Agent Orange.
- Deepening and broadening relations of the US with Cambodia, Laos and Vietnam, and forestall efforts to reverse them on human rights and trade protection grounds.
- Initiating projects to bring to the US for training provincial level international cooperation staff and representatives of domestic NGOs and peoples organizations from Cambodia, Laos and Vietnam
- Mobilizing public and industry opinion to end restrictions on travel to Cuba.

Executive Director of FRD is John McAuliff.

Fund for Reconciliation and Development is financed by foundations, US and European government agencies, international organizations, and private donations.
