= List of heritage sites in KwaZulu-Natal =

This is a list of the heritage sites in KwaZulu-Natal as recognized by the South African Heritage Resource Agency. For performance reasons, List of heritage sites in Pietermaritzburg has been split off from this article.

SAHRA identifier	Site name	Description	Town	District	NHRA status	Coordinates	Image
9/2/401/0001	Mgungundlovu, Farm Moordplaats 193, Babanango District	In its general layout the kraal was oval in shape, with the main gate at the lower end in the direction of the confluence of the two spruits. The circle was formed by two concentric hedges of mimosa stumps within which the huts were located. It is estim...? From the Ntonjaneni Spring the road descends gently to the valley below. There, at the top of a rise, a minor road to the left leads to the Dinganestat Dutch Reformed Church Mission Station. A few kilometres further on is Mgungundhlovu, one of the most immaculate Architectural style: traditional beehive huts. Previous use: other: Zulu Royal homestead. Current use: museum. From Melmoth – Vryheid road turn off to SW about 4 km (2 mi) past turn-off to Ulundi coming from Melmoth, o...? Dingane's capital – the size of the homestead was deliberately recreated by Cetshwayo at Ondini.		Babanango	Provincial Heritage Site	28°26′00″S 31°16′00″E	In its general layout the kraal was oval in shape, with the main gate at the lower end in the direction of the confluence of the two spruits. The circle was formed by two concentric hedges of mimosa stumps within which the huts were located. It is estim...? From the Ntonjaneni Spring the road descends gently to the valley below. There, at the top of a rise, a minor road to the left leads to the Dinganestat Dutch Reformed Church Mission Station. A few kilometres further on is Mgungundhlovu, one of the most immaculate Architectural style: traditional beehive huts. Previous use: other: Zulu Royal homestead. Current use: museum. From Melmoth – Vryheid road turn off to SW about 4 km (2 mi) past turn-off to Ulundi coming from Melmoth, o...? Dingane's capital – the size of the homestead was deliberately recreated by Cetshwayo at Ondini. Media related to uMgungundlovu at Wikimedia Commons
9/2/401/0002	Piet Retief's Grave, Farm Uitzoek 317, Babanango	Near the royal kraal uMgungundlovu is a memorial to Retief and his party, executed on orders from King Dingane on 6 February 1838. By the middle of 1837 the vanguard of the Great Trek had reached the Drakensberg. Piet Retief and a few of his followers proceeded from Kerkenberg via Port Natal to Mgungundhlovu to obtain a grant of land from Dingane on which the Voortrekkers could settle. Ding... Type of site: Grave Current use: grave. Access route to the farm: From Vryheid travel approximately 108 km (67 mi) on the R34 between Ulundi and Vryheid. Turn right at the Dingaanstad/Mgungunhlovu sign and follow the road for 4.91 km (3 mi). Turn right at the Piet Retief Grave site sign and travel another 100 m. Grave of Voortrekker leader Piet Retief.	Ulundi	Babanango	Provincial Heritage Site	28°26′00″S 31°16′00″E	Near the royal kraal uMgungundlovu is a memorial to Retief and his party, executed on orders from King Dingane on 6 February 1838. By the middle of 1837 the vanguard of the Great Trek had reached the Drakensberg. Piet Retief and a few of his followers proceeded from Kerkenberg via Port Natal to Mgungundhlovu to obtain a grant of land from Dingane on which the Voortrekkers could settle. Ding... Type of site: Grave Current use: grave. Access route to the farm: From Vryheid travel approximately 108 km (67 mi) on the R34 between Ulundi and Vryheid. Turn right at the Dingaanstad/Mgungunhlovu sign and follow the road for 4.91 km (3 mi). Turn right at the Piet Retief Grave site sign and travel another 100 m. Grave of Voortrekker leader Piet Retief. Media related to Moordkoppie (KwaZulu-Natal) at Wikimedia Commons
9/2/402/0001	Retief's Pass, Farm Scheepers Hoek 11337 and Bethel 2186, Bergville District	The first party of Voortrekkers to enter Natal, led by Piet Retief, set out from Blydevooruitzicht and commenced the descent of the Drakensberg down this pass on 14 November 1837 with 66 wagons. It reached the foot of the mountain at Bethel by 18 November Type of site: Pass Previous use: pass & fortification. Current use: memorial. Marked turn-off from R615 on opposite side of road to Sterkfontein Dam a few kilometres from the top. Retief's Pass is closely associated with the history of the Great Trek.		Bergville	Provincial Heritage Site	28°34′00″S 29°09′30″E	Upload Photo
9/2/402/0004	Anglo-Boer War Blockhouse, Sharrat Street, Bergville	Constructed of dressed stone with mud mortar and painted, at a later date, with cement mortar; Roof This blockhouse was erected during the latter part of the Anglo-Boer War (1899–1902) by the British troops. It served as a link in the defence network of Natal against the incursions of Boer guerilla fighters and is the only known blockhouse of its kind i Type of site: Blockhouse Previous use: fortification. Current use: clubhouse. From R615 take main turn-off into Bergville along Kingsway. At T-junction in town centre right into T. Historical interest – was erected during later part of the Anglo-Boer war (1899–1902) by British tro	Bergville	Bergville	Provincial Heritage Site	28°43′31″S 29°20′48″E	Constructed of dressed stone with mud mortar and painted, at a later date, with cement mortar; Roof This blockhouse was erected during the latter part of the Anglo-Boer War (1899–1902) by the British troops. It served as a link in the defence network of Natal against the incursions of Boer guerilla fighters and is the only known blockhouse of its kind i Type of site: Blockhouse Previous use: fortification. Current use: clubhouse. From R615 take main turn-off into Bergville along Kingsway. At T-junction in town centre right into T. Historical interest – was erected during later part of the Anglo-Boer war (1899–1902) by British tro
9/2/402/0005	Spioenkop Battlefield, Farm Rhenoster Fontein 1051, Bergville District	This is the site of one of the most famous battles of the Anglo-Boer War. On 24–25 January 1900 the Battle of Spioenkop took place on this hill. Between 2 500 and 2 700 British soldiers and 58 Boers died during this encounter. Type of site: Battlefield Previous use: battlefield. From the Ladysmith take the Bergville road. Turn of to Winterton after 15 km (9 mi). Turn right at signpost. On 24–25 January 1900 the Battle of Spioenkop took place on this hill. Between 2500 and 2700 British	Bergville	Bergville	Provincial Heritage Site	28°39′00″S 29°31′00″E	This is the site of one of the most famous battles of the Anglo-Boer War. On 24–25 January 1900 the Battle of Spioenkop took place on this hill. Between 2 500 and 2 700 British soldiers and 58 Boers died during this encounter. Type of site: Battlefield Previous use: battlefield. From the Ladysmith take the Bergville road. Turn of to Winterton after 15 km (9 mi). Turn right at signpost. On 24–25 January 1900 the Battle of Spioenkop took place on this hill. Between 2500 and 2700 British Media related to Spioenkop Battlefield Memorials at Wikimedia Commons
9/2/403/0001	Cycads, Monteseel Township, Camperdown District	The township of Monteseel lies between Drummond and Inchanga on the road from Durban to Pietermaritzburg that passes the Valley of a Thousand Hills. The Monteseel cycads grow in a deep, rocky kloof in a part of the township which has been set aside as a p...? seems cut off Type of site: Tree Current use: other: indigenous plants. Protected indigenous plants	Inchanga, Montseel Township	Camperdown	Provincial Heritage Site	29°44′05″S 30°40′50″E	Upload Photo
9/2/405/0001	Fort Mistake, Farm Quagga's Kirk 1168, Klip River District	Fort Mistake, built in the style of the Indian hill forts, is architecturally unique in South Africa. It was an important element of the British fortifications, which were erected between Ladysmith and Newcastle just before the First War of Independence i Type of site: Fort Previous use: fortification. Current use: abandoned. On the west side of the R23 about 50 km (31 mi) north of Ladysmith or south of Newcastle is the hamlet of For. Historical and architectural interest – Fort Mistake, built in the style of the Indian hill forts, i	Fort Mistake	Klip River	Provincial Heritage Site	28°10′00″S 29°58′00″E	Upload Photo
9/2/405/0002	Pro Nobis, Fort Mistake, Klip River District	This farmhouse is an excellent example of a smaller Victorian Natal farmhouse and is of fine dressed stone with a high front stoep. The wooden pillars holding the corrugated iron veranda are original. At either end of the veranda are two stoepkamers Altho Type of site: House Current use: house. On the west side of the R23 about 50 km (31 mi) north of Ladysmith or south of Newcastle is the hamlet of For. This dwelling-house, built of dressed stone, is an excellent example of a smaller Natal farmhouse in the Victorian style.	Fort Mistake	Klip River	Provincial Heritage Site	28°10′00″S 29°57′00″E	Upload Photo
9/2/406/0003	Apostolic Faith Mission Church, 17 Gray Street, Dundee	Sandstone church building designed in the Gothic revival style; has an arced entrance with arched s Originally built as a Methodist church; foundation stone laid in 1889 by Mrs J White – opened in 189 Type of site: Church Current use: religious. Historical and architectural interest – A Gothic revival style building built in 1889 and also played	Dundee, Central	Dundee	Provincial Heritage Site	28°10′00″S 30°14′00″E	Upload Photo
9/2/406/0005	Dundee High School, Tatham Street, Dundee	Single storey buildings; corrugated iron roof and face brick walls; roof is also pitched and has gab Erected during 1906/7 and came into use during 1907. The promoter of the erection of the building wa Type of site: School Current use: school. Of historical, cultural, architectural and environmental significance as it is alandmark in Dundee a	Dundee, Central	Dundee	Provincial Heritage Site	28°10′00″S 30°14′00″E	Upload Photo
9/2/406/0005-0012	Lucy Meakin Hall, Dundee High School, Tatham Street, Dundee	Type of site: School Current use: School.	Dundee	Dundee	Pending (Register)	28°10′00″S 30°14′00″E	Upload Photo
9/2/406/0006	Rorke's Drift Battlefield, Farm Oscarsberg 2254, Dundee District	Rorke’s Drift derives its name from James Rorke and is one of the oldest and best-known drifts through the Buffalo River. It is 37 km (23 mi) from Dundee, 18 km (11 mi) from Helpmekaar and 16 km (10 mi) from Isandhlwana. In 1876 the Rev. 0. Witt established a Swedish mission sta Type of site: Battlefield Previous use: battlefield & Mission Station. Current use: site museum. From Greytown take the Tugela Ferry, Dundee Road and turn right to Rorke's Drift at Helpmekaar. From. Here the Battle of Rorke's Drift was fought during the afternoon and night of 22 January 1879. A small British force of two officers and 110 men defended themselves bravely against the repeated attacks of some 4,000 Zulus. Eleven Victoria Crosses were awa		Dundee	Provincial Heritage Site	28°21′S 30°30′E	Rorke’s Drift derives its name from James Rorke and is one of the oldest and best-known drifts through the Buffalo River. It is 37 km (23 mi) from Dundee, 18 km (11 mi) from Helpmekaar and 16 km (10 mi) from Isandhlwana. In 1876 the Rev. 0. Witt established a Swedish mission sta Type of site: Battlefield Previous use: battlefield & Mission Station. Current use: site museum. From Greytown take the Tugela Ferry, Dundee Road and turn right to Rorke's Drift at Helpmekaar. From. Here the Battle of Rorke's Drift was fought during the afternoon and night of 22 January 1879. A small British force of two officers and 110 men defended themselves bravely against the repeated attacks of some 4,000 Zulus. Eleven Victoria Crosses were awa
9/2/406/0008	Old Boswell's Store, 74 Gladstone (Cnr Beaconsfield) Street, Dundee	Double storey; symmetrical; pediment surrounded by cement railings; Georgian-style entrance door; up Was originally built as a Masonic Lodge-the second lodge built in Dundee. During the Anglo-Boer War, Type of site: commercial Current use: shop. This building forms an important part in the architecture of the streetscape of Gladstone Street and	Dundee, Central	Dundee	Provincial Heritage Site	28°10′00″S 30°14′00″E	Upload Photo
9/2/406/0010	Magistrates Court and Police Station, Gladstone (Cnr Beaconsfield) Street, Dundee	Police station building; brown stone building with a wide timber verandah of the traditional Natal st Both buildings built in the same period – 1878. Main section of the police station building original Type of site: Courthouse, Police Station Current use: court and police station. Police station is one of the oldest and well-conserved structures in Dundee, and is also the best e	Dundee, Central	Dundee	Provincial Heritage Site	28°10′00″S 30°14′00″E	Upload Photo
9/2/406/0012/002	Talana Battlefield, Farm Dundee 4339, Dundee District: Talana Museum	A portion of the site of the Battle of Talana, being mostly agricultural land. The Battle of Talana, which took place on 20 October 1899 was the first large battle of the Anglo-Boer War (1899–1902). It was in several other respects also a most important battle from the point of view of military history. Type of site: Museum Previous use: battlefield. Current use: Museum. Travelling out of Dundee towards Vryheid the museum is on the lefthand side of the road about one ki. Historical interest – The Battle of Talana, which took place on 20 October 1899, was the first large		Dundee	Provincial Heritage Site	28°09′00″S 30°16′00″E	A portion of the site of the Battle of Talana, being mostly agricultural land. The Battle of Talana, which took place on 20 October 1899 was the first large battle of the Anglo-Boer War (1899–1902). It was in several other respects also a most important battle from the point of view of military history. Type of site: Museum Previous use: battlefield. Current use: Museum. Travelling out of Dundee towards Vryheid the museum is on the lefthand side of the road about one ki. Historical interest – The Battle of Talana, which took place on 20 October 1899, was the first large
9/2/406/0012/003	Talana Battlefield, Farm Dundee 4339, Dundee District: Thornley Homestead	Homestead consisting of typical colonial farmhouse, a dressed dolorite stable, coach-house with bill Built c1897 after the farm was purchased by Peter Smith, the founder of the Borough of Dundee, for h Type of site: House Previous use: homestead. Current use: guesthouse. Travelling out of Dundee towards Vryheid turn left to Thornley about 2 km (1 mi) after crossing the bridge o. The Thornley Homestead was erected c1897 after Peter Smith, the founder of the Borough of Dundee, pu		Dundee	Provincial Heritage Site	28°08′50″S 30°16′20″E	Homestead consisting of typical colonial farmhouse, a dressed dolorite stable, coach-house with bill Built c1897 after the farm was purchased by Peter Smith, the founder of the Borough of Dundee, for h Type of site: House Previous use: homestead. Current use: guesthouse. Travelling out of Dundee towards Vryheid turn left to Thornley about 2 km (1 mi) after crossing the bridge o. The Thornley Homestead was erected c1897 after Peter Smith, the founder of the Borough of Dundee, pu
9/2/406/0015	Judith Dutch Reformed Church and Cemetery, Farm Paddafontein, Dundee District	Has neo-Gothic windows and doors; straight end-gables; well-proportioned stonework in the walls as w Third church building of the Dutch reformed denomination in Dundee since towns erection in 1862. This stone church with its straight end gables and neo-Gothic windows and doors was inaugurated in January 1885. It was named after Mrs Judith van Tonder who Type of site: Cemetery Current use: church. This stone church with its straight end gables and neo-Gothic windows and doors was inaugurated in J		Dundee	Provincial Heritage Site	28°20′00″S 30°20′10″E	Upload Photo
9/2/406/0017	The Hollies, 29-31 Union Street, Dundee	Single storey building with cruciform corrugated iron roof; plastered brick walls; Oregon pine doors The Hollies is believed to have been built in the 1890s as the home of A.A Smith, a local lawyer, w Type of site: House Current use: house. This elegant, recently restored home is one of the largest and best preserved in Dundee. The quality	Dundee	Dundee	Provincial Heritage Site	28°10′00″S 30°14′00″E	Upload Photo
9/2/406/0021	Coniston, 1 Harvey Street, Dundee	Single-storey house; corrugated iron roof; walls of unplastered brick; two gables with ventilators. A Mr Talbot, the first pharmacist in Natal, had it built in 1906 during a building boom. It was built as Type of site: House Current use: homestead. Historical and architectural – A substantially well-constructed home which has been in the hands of	Dundee, Central	Dundee	Provincial Heritage Site	28°10′00″S 30°14′00″E	Upload Photo
9/2/406/0023/002	Wesleyan Church, 77 McKenzie Street, Dundee	This church, which was designed by Rev. L. P. Norenius, was built under his supervision and was completed in 1898. The church is predominantly in the neo-Gothic style and has a particularly impressive clock tower. Type of site: Church Current use: religious. Swedish Mission Station	Dundee, Central	Dundee	Provincial Heritage Site	28°10′00″S 30°14′00″E	Upload Photo
9/2/406/0024	Pearson House, 48 Tatham Street, Dundee	Corrugated iron roof; textured plastered brick walls; door of Oregon pine with side lights; Bay wind Dwelling House from approximately 1925, now in a general residential zone. Originally the home of Ch Type of site: House Current use: house. A substantial home of a local merchant, unusually elegant for a town the size of Dundee. Typical Natal	Dundee	Dundee	Provincial Heritage Site	28°10′00″S 30°14′00″E	Upload Photo
9/2/406/0025	Ryley's Hill, 79 Karel Landman Street, Dundee	Single storey house of rectangular shape with a verandah running along two sidescorrugated iron roof This impressive dwelling house was erected in 1902 to 1903 as a residence for a Senior Natal Colonial official. The property was transferred to Edward Ryley on 7 July 1910. His son Percy, who inherited it, sold the property to the Government on the 5th of Type of site: House Current use: house.	Dundee, Central	Dundee	Provincial Heritage Site	28°10′00″S 30°14′00″E	Upload Photo
9/2/407/0002	Atherton, 295 Florida Road, Durban	A double-storey house with corrugated iron roof; window openings of a large glazed panel sash variety. It represents one of the few remaining Berea villas which exists in an intact condition. It is the 3rd element of a group of three buildings which have It was built originally as a villa for Mrs Joel In 1903 and was designed by W.E. Robarts. The Boulle family lived there from more than 40 years. Architectural style: Vernacular style. Type of site: House Previous use: house. Current use: restaurant. Turn to north onto Musgrave Rd from Berea Rd North. Turn right into Woodley Rd shortly after crossin. This house from the early Edwardian period and whose restoration in 1985 cost R1000,000, is one of t	Durban, Windermere	Durban	Provincial Heritage Site	31°00′44″S 29°49′47″E	A double-storey house with corrugated iron roof; window openings of a large glazed panel sash variety. It represents one of the few remaining Berea villas which exists in an intact condition. It is the 3rd element of a group of three buildings which have It was built originally as a villa for Mrs Joel In 1903 and was designed by W.E. Robarts. The Boulle family lived there from more than 40 years. Architectural style: Vernacular style. Type of site: House Previous use: house. Current use: restaurant. Turn to north onto Musgrave Rd from Berea Rd North. Turn right into Woodley Rd shortly after crossin. This house from the early Edwardian period and whose restoration in 1985 cost R1000,000, is one of t
9/2/407/0004	Umbilo Shree Ambalavanaar Alayam Temple, 890 Bellair Road, Durban	The original Shree Ambalavanaar Alayam was the first public Hindu temple to be erected on the African continent. Built in 1875, it was damaged beyond repair during floods in 1905. The present temple was designed by K. Reddy and built by R. K. Pillay. This Type of site: Temple Current use: temple. From N3 coming into Durban CBD take Brickfield Rd off-ramp and turn right (south) and first right on. The original Shree Ambalavanaar Alayam was the first public Hindu temple to be erected on the Africa	Durban, Bellair	Durban	Provincial Heritage Site	29°51′03″S 30°58′22″E	The original Shree Ambalavanaar Alayam was the first public Hindu temple to be erected on the African continent. Built in 1875, it was damaged beyond repair during floods in 1905. The present temple was designed by K. Reddy and built by R. K. Pillay. This Type of site: Temple Current use: temple. From N3 coming into Durban CBD take Brickfield Rd off-ramp and turn right (south) and first right on. The original Shree Ambalavanaar Alayam was the first public Hindu temple to be erected on the Africa
9/2/407/0006	The Manor House, 14 Nuttall Gardens, Durban	A significant Berea landmark; large village with porticos and colonnades in a Revived English Baroqu Architectural style: Revived English Baroque style. Type of site: House Previous use: house. Current use: offices. The Manor House was built c1904 for Sir Liege Hulett, legendary father of Natal's sugar industry, Se	Durban, Morningside	Durban	Pending (Declaration)	31°00′49″S 29°49′39″E	A significant Berea landmark; large village with porticos and colonnades in a Revived English Baroqu Architectural style: Revived English Baroque style. Type of site: House Previous use: house. Current use: offices. The Manor House was built c1904 for Sir Liege Hulett, legendary father of Natal's sugar industry, Se
9/2/407/0008	Sastri College, 20 Winterton Walk, Durban	A two-storeyed school building; in Berea style of the union period; hipped tiled roofs with projecti As a result of the ""uplift""- clause in the Cape Town Agreement concluded in 1926 between the governments of India and the Africa, the Right Honourable Mr V Srinevasa Sastri, Agent General, wanted to build a combined training school for teachers and a hi Architectural style: Berea Style. Current use: college. From CBD head inland along Smith St (oneway) and onto Berea Rd. Turn right at junction with Cleaver. Of cultural significance	Durban, Musgrave	Durban	Provincial Heritage Site	31°00′35″S 29°51′10″E	A two-storeyed school building; in Berea style of the union period; hipped tiled roofs with projecti As a result of the ""uplift""- clause in the Cape Town Agreement concluded in 1926 between the governments of India and the Africa, the Right Honourable Mr V Srinevasa Sastri, Agent General, wanted to build a combined training school for teachers and a hi Architectural style: Berea Style. Current use: college. From CBD head inland along Smith St (oneway) and onto Berea Rd. Turn right at junction with Cleaver. Of cultural significance
9/2/407/0010	City Hall and Francis Farewell Gardens, 263 West (Cnr Smith and Gardiner) Street, Durban	The Town Hall, Durban, was designed by Philip Dudgeon in the neo-classical style. The foundation stone was laid in February 1883. The Francis Farewell Gardens in front of the Town Hall were laid out on the site of the first White settlement west of Port Type of site: City Hall Current use: City Hall. The Frances Farewell gardens are the area containing the war memorial between the City Hall and Gard. The Durban City Hall, together with the Francis Farewell Gardens, forms an important cultural and hi	Durban, Central	Durban	Provincial Heritage Site	31°01′31″S 29°51′29″E	The Town Hall, Durban, was designed by Philip Dudgeon in the neo-classical style. The foundation stone was laid in February 1883. The Francis Farewell Gardens in front of the Town Hall were laid out on the site of the first White settlement west of Port Type of site: City Hall Current use: City Hall. The Frances Farewell gardens are the area containing the war memorial between the City Hall and Gard. The Durban City Hall, together with the Francis Farewell Gardens, forms an important cultural and hi Media related to Durban Town Hall at Wikimedia Commons
9/2/407/0011	Old Point Railway Station, 111 Point Road, Durban	Main building has an arched entrance flanked by a pair of gable fronts with wellproportioned windows Erected in 1890 by the NGR and played a very important part in the development of the port of Durban. This Victorian railway station dates from the eighteen-nineties when the Natal Government Railways experienced a boom. The wrought iron verandah and the b Type of site: Railway Station Previous use: railway station. Current use: offices. From the CBD take West St. (oneway) towards the beach. Turn right into Point Rd and travel out of th.? This Victorian railway station dates from the eighteen-nineties when the Natal Government Railways ex	Durban, Point	Durban	Provincial Heritage Site	29°52′16″S 31°02′42″E	Main building has an arched entrance flanked by a pair of gable fronts with wellproportioned windows Erected in 1890 by the NGR and played a very important part in the development of the port of Durban. This Victorian railway station dates from the eighteen-nineties when the Natal Government Railways experienced a boom. The wrought iron verandah and the b Type of site: Railway Station Previous use: railway station. Current use: offices. From the CBD take West St. (oneway) towards the beach. Turn right into Point Rd and travel out of th.? This Victorian railway station dates from the eighteen-nineties when the Natal Government Railways ex
9/2/407/0012	Caister Lodge, 264 Musgrave Road, Durban	A two storied house (now a portion of a hotel), significant as an example of developed Tudor Revival The original building on this site was erected c1890 by Sir Benjamin Greenacre, prominent entrepreneur. Architectural style: Tudor Revival style. Type of site: House Previous use: house. Current use: old age home. The three-storey portion of the hotel complex was erected on the site of Sir Benjamin Greenacre's or	Durban, Musgrave	Durban	Provincial Heritage Site	31°00′09″S 29°50′42″E	Upload Photo
9/2/407/0013	Congella Battlefield, Maydon Road, Durban	This small erf is the only remaining part of the battle site which has not been built over. There are two monuments on the site but they do not specifically indicate that the battle took pl there and are not part of the motivation. The site is in fairly During the rule of the Republic of Natalie Captain TC Smith was given orders by the Governor of the Cape Colony, Sir George Napier, to occupy Port Natal (present Durban). On 5 May 1842 he occupied the old British fort (Victoria) on the Point and establish Type of site: Battlefield Previous use: other: laager & battlefield. Current use: memorial. The battle at Congella led to a protracted siege of a site which is now in the built up area of Durb	Durban, Maydon Wharf	Durban	Provincial Heritage Site	29°51′54″S 31°00′48″E	This small erf is the only remaining part of the battle site which has not been built over. There are two monuments on the site but they do not specifically indicate that the battle took pl there and are not part of the motivation. The site is in fairly During the rule of the Republic of Natalie Captain TC Smith was given orders by the Governor of the Cape Colony, Sir George Napier, to occupy Port Natal (present Durban). On 5 May 1842 he occupied the old British fort (Victoria) on the Point and establish Type of site: Battlefield Previous use: other: laager & battlefield. Current use: memorial. The battle at Congella led to a protracted siege of a site which is now in the built up area of Durb
9/2/407/0014	Old Greenacres Building, 411-23 West Street, Durban	A significant Victorian facade in Renaissance Revival style, to a department store with historical a Historical and economic associations with the growth of the city. Architectural style: Renaissance Revival style. Type of site: commercial Current use: shops.	Durban, Central	Durban	Register	29°51′27″S 31°01′38″E	Upload Photo
9/2/407/0016	Quadrant House, 114-115 Victoria Embankment, Durban	Double-storeyed house of quadrant form; broken up vertically by paired Tuscan Doric columns; Union p In 1929 H Live commissioned architect Ritchie Mckinley to design a building named Quadrant House. Lo Architectural style: Berea style. Previous use: other: training establishment. Current use: offices. Situated on north side of Victoria Embankment between Gardiner and Filed Streets.. Corner and vista significance along the Victoria Embankment.	Durban, Central	Durban	Provincial Heritage Site	31°01′18″S 29°51′41″E	Double-storeyed house of quadrant form; broken up vertically by paired Tuscan Doric columns; Union p In 1929 H Live commissioned architect Ritchie Mckinley to design a building named Quadrant House. Lo Architectural style: Berea style. Previous use: other: training establishment. Current use: offices. Situated on north side of Victoria Embankment between Gardiner and Filed Streets.. Corner and vista significance along the Victoria Embankment.
9/2/407/0017	Monaltrie, 59 Musgrave Road, Berea, Durban	A significant Berea villa of the Victorian period with Italianate characteristics; two storied gable Architectural style: Berea style. Type of site: House Current use: house. Turn north into Musgrave Road from Berea Road North. One of the best examples of Victorian architecture in Durban	Durban, Musgrave	Durban	Provincial Heritage Site	30°59′56″S 29°51′04″E	A significant Berea villa of the Victorian period with Italianate characteristics; two storied gable Architectural style: Berea style. Type of site: House Current use: house. Turn north into Musgrave Road from Berea Road North. One of the best examples of Victorian architecture in Durban
9/2/407/0018	Local History Museum, Aliwal Street, Durban	The building of the Durban Local History Museum was completed in 1866. The architect was Peter Paterson. The building was originally used as a court and post office and as such is the oldest surviving Government building in Durban. Current use: museum. This building is located between the beach end of the City Hall and Aliwal Street.. Historical and architectural interest- The building was originally used as a court and post office a	Durban, Central	Durban	Provincial Heritage Site	29°51′30″S 31°01′39″E	The building of the Durban Local History Museum was completed in 1866. The architect was Peter Paterson. The building was originally used as a court and post office and as such is the oldest surviving Government building in Durban. Current use: museum. This building is located between the beach end of the City Hall and Aliwal Street.. Historical and architectural interest- The building was originally used as a court and post office a
9/2/407/0019	Colinton, 68 Ridge Road, Durban	Colinton House is important architecturally for the unique and subtle way in which it integrates the comfortably, low spreading character of the early Natal verandah house with the imposing two-storeyed character of a late-nineteenth-century Berea villa o The historical interest attached to the building stems from the fact that it was built for David Hunter, the first General Manager of the Natal Government Rail ways in 1898. David Hunter was a very prominent character in Natal Society and not only became Type of site: House Current use: residence. This site is in Ridge Road in the block immediately north of the motorway.. This magnificent residence was built in 1898 by the architect William Street-Wilson for Sir David Hunter, General Manager of the Natal Government Railways from 1879 to 1906.	Durban, Musgrave	Durban	Provincial Heritage Site	30°59′29″S 29°50′54″E	Upload Photo
9/2/407/0020	41 Cedar Road, Congella, Durban	Double-storeyed face brick house of the Victorian period with verandahs to two floors and two sides; Until fairly recently the house has been the home of a prominent author and social anthropologist Architectural style: Vernacular style. Type of site: House Current use: residence. Coming from CBD along Umbilo Road, turn right into Cedar Road when reaching Congela Park.. It is of both architectural and historical significance. It represents one of the last surviving bui	Durban, Congella	Durban	Provincial Heritage Site	30°59′21″S 29°52′30″E	Upload Photo
9/2/407/0021	Bergtheil Museum, 16 Queens Avenue, Westville	The original part of the house is a single row of interleading rooms on both sides of an entrance ha The Bergtheil House, the core of which dates from 1847, formed the nucleus of the Westville residential area. It was built by Jonas Bergtheil, industrialist and member of the Legislative Council from 1857 to 1866, as the centre for the administration of t Type of site: House Previous use: house. Current use: museum. From N3 take Westville off-ramp and head north for about 1,8km along St James (M32). Turn right into. Historical and Architectural – Bergthiel House, dating from 1847, formed nucleus of Westville reside	Westville, Beverley Hills	Durban	Provincial Heritage Site	30°55′50″S 29°50′06″E	Upload Photo
9/2/407/0022	Bellair Railway Station, Sarnia Road, Durban	Formed of two parts under one roof; these are divided by a passage which forms the entrance to platf Present station building was built in 1900, to plans drawn in 1899, as part of an upgrading project Architectural style: Victorian. Type of site: Railway Station Current use: station. From N3 coming into Durban CBD take Brickfield Rd off-ramp and turn right (south) and first right on. One of the first five stations laid down by NGR and was completed in 1900, forming an integral part	Durban, Bellair	Durban	Provincial Heritage Site	29°53′22″S 30°57′15″E	Formed of two parts under one roof; these are divided by a passage which forms the entrance to platf Present station building was built in 1900, to plans drawn in 1899, as part of an upgrading project Architectural style: Victorian. Type of site: Railway Station Current use: station. From N3 coming into Durban CBD take Brickfield Rd off-ramp and turn right (south) and first right on. One of the first five stations laid down by NGR and was completed in 1900, forming an integral part Media related to Bellair Railway Station at Wikimedia Commons
9/2/407/0023	Supreme Court, 151 Victoria Embankment, Durban	Double-storeyed building of rectangular form; rusticated plasters with cartouche windows, lancet wind This building, designed by the architect Stanley Hudson, was erected in 1911. Type of site: Courthouse Current use: supreme court. Situated on north side of Victoria Embankment between Filed and Broad Streets.. This building, designed by the architect Stanley Hudson, was erected in 1911.	Durban, Central	Durban	Provincial Heritage Site	31°01′11″S 29°51′45″E	Double-storeyed building of rectangular form; rusticated plasters with cartouche windows, lancet wind This building, designed by the architect Stanley Hudson, was erected in 1911. Type of site: Courthouse Current use: supreme court. Situated on north side of Victoria Embankment between Filed and Broad Streets.. This building, designed by the architect Stanley Hudson, was erected in 1911.
9/2/407/0024	Lillieshell, 408 Innes Road, Durban	A large two-storeyed villa with gables, projecting bay windows, verandahs; notable details including Built for C.E. James, Esquire, an early pioneer of Durban. James family emigrated from the village o Type of site: House Previous use: house. Current use: offices (consulate). Turn to north onto Musgrave Rd from Berea Rd North. At end of Musgrave turn right Innes Road. Site i. Of Historical and architectural significance	Durban, Morningside	Durban	Provincial Heritage Site	31°00′48″S 29°49′43″E	Upload Photo
9/2/407/0028	Old Fort and Cemetery, Old Fort Road, Durban	This interesting fort and cemetery are situated in Umgeni Road in the heart of Durban, just behind the Post Office. In the beginning of 1837 the Voortrekkers crossed the Drakensberg mountains and entered Natal. The governor of the Cape, Sir George Napier, Type of site: Fort Previous use: fortification. Current use: cemetery & chapel & houses. Locality & Environs: The property is located to the north of the Durban Central Business District with a total of two road frontages namely masabala Yengwa Avenue and Archie Gumede Place, within the block completed by Old Ford Road (KE Masinga Road) and O. The Old Fort, now in part transformed into comfortable quarters for ex-service veterans, contains m	Durban, Stamford Hill	Durban	Provincial Heritage Site	29°51′03″S 31°01′34″E	This interesting fort and cemetery are situated in Umgeni Road in the heart of Durban, just behind the Post Office. In the beginning of 1837 the Voortrekkers crossed the Drakensberg mountains and entered Natal. The governor of the Cape, Sir George Napier, Type of site: Fort Previous use: fortification. Current use: cemetery & chapel & houses. Locality & Environs: The property is located to the north of the Durban Central Business District with a total of two road frontages namely masabala Yengwa Avenue and Archie Gumede Place, within the block completed by Old Ford Road (KE Masinga Road) and O. The Old Fort, now in part transformed into comfortable quarters for ex-service veterans, contains m Media related to Old Fort, Durban at Wikimedia Commons
9/2/407/0032	Trevean, 258 Wakesleigh (Cnr Kenmare) Road, Durban	U-shThe house is U—shaped with the legs of the U ending in fine, high, three sided bay windows. The whole house is surrounded by a verandah of cast iron making the house look far larger and more imposing than it actually is. The stoep is patterned in colo Trevean is a typical Natal Verandah house built in 1882 for Captain Hitchings, a pioneer in Durban's shipping world. It is said to be the work of two well-known Natal architects Robert Sellers Upton (Durban's first town surveyor and designer of St Paul's C Type of site: House Current use: house. From N3 coming into Durban CBD take Brickfield Rd off-ramp and turn right (south) and first right on. This imposing dwelling-house was designed and erected in 1882 by the well-known architects Robert Sellers Upton and Philip Dudgeon. The billiard room was added in 1898. Trevean House is probably the best example of a late-Colonial Victorian building in N	Durban, Bellair	Durban	Provincial Heritage Site	30°57′09″S 29°53′03″E	Upload Photo
9/2/407/0033	73 Musgrave Road, Musgrave, Durban	Double-storeyed manor house; square form; roofing -corrugated sheet metal; walling -painted brickwork; This magnificent double-storeyed manor-house, designed by the architect P. Piekes and erected in 1904/5, is an excel lent example of a Natal verandah house erected at the begin ning of the century. The fine detailing to the timber verandahs is also notew Type of site: House Current use: residence. Turn north into Musgrave road from Berea Road North.. This magnificent double-storeyed manor house is and excellent example of a Natal verandah house erec	Durban, Musgrave	Durban	Provincial Heritage Site	30°59′58″S 29°51′02″E	Upload Photo
9/2/407/0037	St Louis' Roman Catholic Church, 22 Jacobs Rd, Durban	Constructed of stone and plastered brick with four-storied tower the entrance with castellations abo Declared a national monument in February 1989. Type of site: Church Current use: religious. From CBD take Victoria embankment heading inland and get onto South Coast Freeway. Take Montclair/ C. Site is of historical importance to Clairwood community.	Durban, Clairwood	Durban	Provincial Heritage Site	30°54′33″S 29°52′22″E	Upload Photo
9/2/407/0038	Natal Herbarium, 4 Edith Benson Crescent, Durban	A red-brick building consisting of a large specimens storage area flanked by two gable-ended wings. H Origins of Natal Herbarium date back to 1848 and the foundation of the Natal Agricultural and Hortic Type of site: commercial Current use: offices & other: botanical centre. This building is significant in terms of the development of botanical knowledge in South Africa and	Durban, Musgrave	Durban	Provincial Heritage Site	31°00′17″S 29°50′48″E	A red-brick building consisting of a large specimens storage area flanked by two gable-ended wings. H Origins of Natal Herbarium date back to 1848 and the foundation of the Natal Agricultural and Hortic Type of site: commercial Current use: offices & other: botanical centre. This building is significant in terms of the development of botanical knowledge in South Africa and Media related to Natal Herbarium at Wikimedia Commons
9/2/407/0040	Riche's Building, 423 Smith (Cnr Masonic) Street, Durban	Multi-storied, plastered walls; verandahs with cast iron columns, brackets, friezes and balusters, f This building, which is an excellent example of the Classical Revivalist style at the turn of the century, forms an integral part of the architecture of Smith Street, one of the most historic streets in Durban. Type of site: commercial Current use: restaurant & offices. Situated on harbour side of block between Filed and Broad Streets. West Street is a oneway heading i. This building, which is an excellent example of the Classical Revivalist style at the turn of the c	Durban, Central	Durban	Provincial Heritage Site	31°01′10″S 29°51′38″E	Upload Photo
9/2/407/0045	Portview, 183 Cowey (Cnr Haden) Road, Durban	A very fine Edwardian house with complimentary garden walls, gates and outbuildings. Has front veran The house was built by T.B.F. Davis a prominent citizen of Durban. His two granddaughters, treasured Architectural style: Italianate style. Type of site: House Previous use: house. Current use: offices. From Berea Road North turn north into Botanic Gardens Road. After several blocks and at the start of. This remarkable building, one of the few surviving great mansions of Durban, is noted for the state	Durban, Essenwood	Durban	Provincial Heritage Site	31°00′39″S 29°50′18″E	A very fine Edwardian house with complimentary garden walls, gates and outbuildings. Has front veran The house was built by T.B.F. Davis a prominent citizen of Durban. His two granddaughters, treasured Architectural style: Italianate style. Type of site: House Previous use: house. Current use: offices. From Berea Road North turn north into Botanic Gardens Road. After several blocks and at the start of. This remarkable building, one of the few surviving great mansions of Durban, is noted for the state
9/2/407/0046	King's House, Eastbourne Road, Durban	A significant official residence of the State President; two storied Edwardian Pavilion style villa Was built to serve as Marine residence of the Governor after it was decided that Portsdown House on the Avictoria Embankment was no longer suitable. After Union in 1910 it became the traditional residence of the Governor General, and then after 1961, the Architectural style: Victorian Utilitarian/Vernacular style. Type of site: House Current use: other: State residence. This building has been intimately connected with the constitutional development of Natal and South A	Durban	Durban	Provincial Heritage Site	29°49′32″S 31°00′51″E	Upload Photo
9/2/407/0049	Riverside Soofie Mosque and Mausoleum, 50 Lower Bridge Road, Durban	This mosque was erected by the celebrated Hajee Soofie, who immigrated to South Africa in 1895. He was responsible for the construction of 11 other mosques, the establishment of 13 madresas and the laying out of a large number of cemeteries. Hajee Soofie Type of site: Mosque Current use: mosque. From the CBD take Aliwal Street to the North, becomes N.M.R. Ave, and after crossing Umgeni River, was erected by celebrated Hajee Soofie who immigrated to South Africa in 1895. He was responsible for	Durban, Athlone	Durban	Provincial Heritage Site	31°02′03″S 29°48′22″E	This mosque was erected by the celebrated Hajee Soofie, who immigrated to South Africa in 1895. He was responsible for the construction of 11 other mosques, the establishment of 13 madresas and the laying out of a large number of cemeteries. Hajee Soofie Type of site: Mosque Current use: mosque. From the CBD take Aliwal Street to the North, becomes N.M.R. Ave, and after crossing Umgeni River, was erected by celebrated Hajee Soofie who immigrated to South Africa in 1895. He was responsible for Media related to Riverside Soofie Mosque and Mausoleum at Wikimedia Commons
9/2/407/0051	Wild Fig Trees, West (Cnr Church) Street, Durban	Forest of indigenous trees This property forms an important part of the historic site of the first White settlement west of Port Natal. The erf is one of the few open spaces in the city centre of Durban and, with its indigenous trees, it constitutes an important aesthetic element. Type of site: Tree Current use: trees. From the western (inland) end of the City Hall head north up pedestrianised Church St. Cross West St. This property forms an important part of the historic site of the first white settlement west of por	Durban, Central	Durban	Provincial Heritage Site	29°51′30″S 31°01′31″E	Upload Photo
9/2/407/0052	Glacial Pavement, Corinthia Road, Durban	Crystalline rocks cropping out in a line parallel with the direction of the sea-coast are infringed u The glaciated pavement shows striae on Table Mountain sandstone at the base of the Dwyka tillite of the Karoo System and is approximately 300 million years Old. Current use: geological formation. Historical and scientific interest- The glaciated pavement shows striae on Table Mountain sandstone	Durban, Reedbank	Durban	Provincial Heritage Site	29°51′31″S 31°01′19″E	Upload Photo
9/2/407/0054	Queen's Tavern, 16 Stamford Hill Road, Durban	The original portion of Queen's Tavern, built in 1894, consisted of a foyer with a pressed steel ceiling, a billiard room, a smoking room, a staff room and several out buildings. In 1903 a committee room and kitchen was added and the billiard room enlarge The Queen’s Tavern which originally operated as a gentlemen’s club, is, as far as can be ascertained the oldest licensed premises in Durban as the licence dates back to 1894. This building, often described a bastion of a forgotten era, is one of Durban’s Type of site: commercial Previous use: restaurant. Current use: other: music hall. From CBD take Filed Street north, becomes Umgeni Rd. Turn left into Argyle Rd and shortly left again. Built as a gentlemen's club in 1894, this is one of Durban's few remaining links with the colonial p???	Durban, Greyville	Durban	Provincial Heritage Site	31°01′13″S 29°50′26″E	The original portion of Queen's Tavern, built in 1894, consisted of a foyer with a pressed steel ceiling, a billiard room, a smoking room, a staff room and several out buildings. In 1903 a committee room and kitchen was added and the billiard room enlarge The Queen’s Tavern which originally operated as a gentlemen’s club, is, as far as can be ascertained the oldest licensed premises in Durban as the licence dates back to 1894. This building, often described a bastion of a forgotten era, is one of Durban’s Type of site: commercial Previous use: restaurant. Current use: other: music hall. From CBD take Filed Street north, becomes Umgeni Rd. Turn left into Argyle Rd and shortly left again. Built as a gentlemen's club in 1894, this is one of Durban's few remaining links with the colonial p???
9/2/407/0055	Main Post Office, West (Cnr Gardiner) Street, Durban	The Durban Post Office stands at the corner of West Street and Gardiner Street. Its Renaissance architecture contrasts with the hard lines of the tall modern concrete buildings in the neighbourhood but its colonnade of Greek columns and dignified tower in The Old Durban Town Hall, at present the General Post Office, was designed in 1882 by Phillip Dudgeon. The foundation stone was laid in 1883 and the building was opened in 1885. The building is an outstanding example of neo-Classical architecture and play Type of site: Post Office Current use: post office. Gardener St is a one-way heading to the harbour and Pine St a one-way heading inland. The site is in t. The building is an outstanding example of neo-classical architecture and played an important part in the	Durban, Central	Durban	Provincial Heritage Site	29°51′28″S 31°01′30″E	The Durban Post Office stands at the corner of West Street and Gardiner Street. Its Renaissance architecture contrasts with the hard lines of the tall modern concrete buildings in the neighbourhood but its colonnade of Greek columns and dignified tower in The Old Durban Town Hall, at present the General Post Office, was designed in 1882 by Phillip Dudgeon. The foundation stone was laid in 1883 and the building was opened in 1885. The building is an outstanding example of neo-Classical architecture and play Type of site: Post Office Current use: post office. Gardener St is a one-way heading to the harbour and Pine St a one-way heading inland. The site is in t. The building is an outstanding example of neo-classical architecture and played an important part in the
9/2/407/0056	Durban Light Infantry Headquarters, 5 DLI Avenue, Durban	A two storied Regimental headquarters of the Edwardian period in the Free style; pavilions, gables, Architectural style: Free style. Current use: other: battalion headquarters. This site is intrinsically connected with the history and traditions of one of the country's famous	Durban, Greyville	Durban	Provincial Heritage Site	29°50′51″S 31°00′57″E	A two storied Regimental headquarters of the Edwardian period in the Free style; pavilions, gables, Architectural style: Free style. Current use: other: battalion headquarters. This site is intrinsically connected with the history and traditions of one of the country's famous
9/2/407/0060	Beachwood Mangroves, Broadway, Durban	Consists of trees and bushes growing between the high spring tide and mean sea level. Mangrove swamps are one of the rarest and most scientifically interesting ecosystems that occur in the highly specialised tidal environment. The Beachwood Mangroves are of significant botanical, educational and, historical value because they are situated Current use: other: mangroves. The Beachwood Mangroves are of significant botanical, educational and historical value because they	Durban, Beachwood	Durban	Provincial Heritage Site	29°47′53″S 31°02′34″E	Upload Photo
9/2/407/0064	Cottam Grove Hotel, 303-309 Florida (Cnr Cottam) Road, Durban	Two freestanding and two storied villas of the Edwardian period; of the gabled types with corner verandas in timber; lower verandas wider with cat-slide corrugated iron roofs above; ventilations to gables, coloured glass to entrance doors and sidelights Built in about 1903 for Sir Abe Bailey, a well-known mining magnate. After WWII, the houses were used The two adjacent buildings were designed for wealthy diamond magnates in about 1902. They were originally two separate villas but are now being run as a p Type of site: Hotel Previous use: houses. Current use: hotel. Turn to north onto Musgrave Rd from Berea Rd North. Turn right into Woodley Rd shortly after crossing.	Durban, Windermere	Durban	Provincial Heritage Site	31°00′43″S 29°49′46″E	Two freestanding and two storied villas of the Edwardian period; of the gabled types with corner verandas in timber; lower verandas wider with cat-slide corrugated iron roofs above; ventilations to gables, coloured glass to entrance doors and sidelights Built in about 1903 for Sir Abe Bailey, a well-known mining magnate. After WWII, the houses were used The two adjacent buildings were designed for wealthy diamond magnates in about 1902. They were originally two separate villas but are now being run as a p Type of site: Hotel Previous use: houses. Current use: hotel. Turn to north onto Musgrave Rd from Berea Rd North. Turn right into Woodley Rd shortly after crossing.
9/2/407/0065	Elephant House, 745 Ridge Road, Durban	It is a low rectangular cottage of great charm set in pleasant grounds in a cul-de-sac on Ridge Road. A typical Natal verandah with original woodwork runs the entire length of the front facade. There are no windows in the front facade, only rather de This is reputedly the first house built on the Berea. Possible it is the oldest remaining house in Durban and dates from about 1849. In the days when the Elephant House was first constructed, elephants still trampled. around the Berea bush. The house was Type of site: House Current use: house. From Berea Rd turn north into Ridge Rd. This site is shortly after crossing Springfield Rd. Elephant House dates from about 1849 and is the most historic of the remaining colonial period houses in Durban. It contributes greatly to the historic Ridge Road environment, one of Durban's most important environments.	Durban	Durban	Provincial Heritage Site	29°49′42″S 31°00′19″E	It is a low rectangular cottage of great charm set in pleasant grounds in a cul-de-sac on Ridge Road. A typical Natal verandah with original woodwork runs the entire length of the front facade. There are no windows in the front facade, only rather de This is reputedly the first house built on the Berea. Possible it is the oldest remaining house in Durban and dates from about 1849. In the days when the Elephant House was first constructed, elephants still trampled. around the Berea bush. The house was Type of site: House Current use: house. From Berea Rd turn north into Ridge Rd. This site is shortly after crossing Springfield Rd. Elephant House dates from about 1849 and is the most historic of the remaining colonial period houses in Durban. It contributes greatly to the historic Ridge Road environment, one of Durban's most important environments.
9/2/407/0066	Howard Memorial College, King George V Avenue, Durban	Oldest building on campus site; funds for construction were contributed by T.B. Davis, Durban business Type of site: Memorial Current use: University. Ridge Rd head south. Becomes King George V, right Queen Elizabeth, 1st left 75th Anniversary. Park i. It forms an integral part of the history of the University of Natal, creates a focal point and thus	Durban	Durban	Provincial Heritage Site	29°51′59″S 30°58′53″E	Upload Photo
9/2/407/0067	Durban Indian Girls Secondary School, 88 Carlisle (Cnr Dartnell) Road, Durban	A set of single-storied structures; variation of Indian vernacular style with curvilinear gables; ve This building was originally the Dartnell Crescent School for Boys. It became the first High School Architectural style: Indian Vernacular style. Type of site: School Current use: school. An important building in architectural, cultural and historical terms.	Durban, Central	Durban	Provincial Heritage Site	31°00′50″S 29°51′01″E	Upload Photo
9/2/407/0068	Little Chelsea, 18 Windermere Road, Durban	A significant, Victorian building of two floors in Vernacular style; cast iron and timber verandas o Designed for Mr L Evans, for use as a shop, dining room and kitchen on the ground floor, with a livi Architectural style: Vernacular style. Type of site: Commercial / Residential Previous use: shop & house. From CBD take Filed Street north, becomes Umgeni Rd. Turn left into Argyle Rd and left again into Wi. It is one of the last remaining double storey cast-iron verandah buildings in Durban and the quality	Durban, Windermere	Durban	Provincial Heritage Site	31°01′07″S 29°50′19″E	A significant, Victorian building of two floors in Vernacular style; cast iron and timber verandas o Designed for Mr L Evans, for use as a shop, dining room and kitchen on the ground floor, with a livi Architectural style: Vernacular style. Type of site: Commercial / Residential Previous use: shop & house. From CBD take Filed Street north, becomes Umgeni Rd. Turn left into Argyle Rd and left again into Wi. It is one of the last remaining double storey cast-iron verandah buildings in Durban and the quality
9/2/407/0070	Memorial Tower Building, King George V Avenue, Durban	Second oldest building on the University of Natal Durban campus; originally known as the Science and Type of site: Memorial Current use: university. On Ridge Rd head south. Becomes King George V, right into Queen Elizabeth, 1st left 75th Anniversary. The Memorial Tower was built c1947-50, funds being raised from various sources. Together with the Ho	Durban, University	Durban	Provincial Heritage Site	29°51′59″S 30°58′53″E	Second oldest building on the University of Natal Durban campus; originally known as the Science and Type of site: Memorial Current use: university. On Ridge Rd head south. Becomes King George V, right into Queen Elizabeth, 1st left 75th Anniversary. The Memorial Tower was built c1947-50, funds being raised from various sources. Together with the Ho
9/2/407/0073	War Department Lords' Ground Boundary Marker No 2, Old Fort Road, Durban	Stone marker with inscription; 225x225x750mm high Once common in Durban, of type used during colonial era to demarcate property owned by the War Depart. Type of site: Fort Previous use: other: boundary marker. Current use: other: disused. This unusual marker is significant in that it is the only remaining one of many which were once used to demarcate property boundaries in the City of Durban. As such it is also a notable physical manifestation of the history of survey techniques and estab	Durban, Stamford Hill	Durban	Provincial Heritage Site	29°50′56″S 31°02′06″E	Upload Photo
9/2/407/0074	First Outspan Wild Fig Tree, Westville	Type of site: Tree. The tree stood at the first outspan post on the old road between Pietermaritzburg and Durban.	Westville	Durban	Provisional Protection	29°49′09″S 30°56′56″E	Upload Photo
9/2/407/0076	Phoenix Settlement, Phoenix, Durban	0	Durban	Durban	Provisional Protection	29°42′11″S 31°00′13″E	Upload Photo
9/2/407/0077	Dutch Reformed Church, 151 Smith Street, Durban	Double-storeyed building of longitudinal form; hipped, marseilles tiled roof; two plain gables; quoi Architectural style: Cape Dutch Revival style. Type of site: Church Current use: religious. This prominent structure is designed by an important architect and fulfilled a crucial historical ro	Durban, Central	Durban	Provincial Heritage Site	31°01′51″S 29°51′31″E	Upload Photo
9/2/407/0079	271 Cowey Road, Essenwood, Durban	A Victorian house in Vernacular style; single storied with gable and two verandas; two bay windows; Built in 1911 for a mr DC Kennedy, this site has since that time been occupied by members of his famous Architectural style: Vernacular – single storied verandah house. Type of site: House Previous use: house. Current use: offices. This unusual find is one of the few intact examples of the life-style and tastes of occupants of Dur	Durban, Essenwood	Durban	Provisional Protection	31°00′47″S 29°50′06″E	A Victorian house in Vernacular style; single storied with gable and two verandas; two bay windows; Built in 1911 for a mr DC Kennedy, this site has since that time been occupied by members of his famous Architectural style: Vernacular – single storied verandah house. Type of site: House Previous use: house. Current use: offices. This unusual find is one of the few intact examples of the life-style and tastes of occupants of Dur
9/2/407/0083	Hollis House, 178 Florida Road, Durban	A significant Edwardian house of two stories in Baroque Revival style; arched verandas to two sides; Constructed by Mr Jack Hollis, building contractor for the City Hall, Durban. The Architect is rumou Architectural style: Baroque Revival style. Type of site: House Previous use: house. Current use: offices. One of the great homes of Durban this building is renowned for the quality of its design, finishes a	Durban	Durban	Provincial Heritage Site	31°00′59″S 29°49′57″E	A significant Edwardian house of two stories in Baroque Revival style; arched verandas to two sides; Constructed by Mr Jack Hollis, building contractor for the City Hall, Durban. The Architect is rumou Architectural style: Baroque Revival style. Type of site: House Previous use: house. Current use: offices. One of the great homes of Durban this building is renowned for the quality of its design, finishes a
9/2/407/0085	Passive Resistance Site, Umbilo (Cnr Gale) Road, Durban	This site symbolises for the Indian community in KwaZulu-Natal the start of the Passive Resistance C	Durban, Umbilo	Durban	Provincial Heritage Site	29°51′55″S 31°00′05″E	Upload Photo
9/2/407/0087	Kingsleigh Lodge, 241 McDonald Road, Durban	An historic, two storied, Edwardian building (a municipal police station up to 1936) in a Baroque Re Architectural style: Baroque Revival style. Type of site: House Previous use: police station. Current use: old age home. This prominent building, at various times a police station, nursing home and private hotel, is a noted landmark in its area, and is an excellent example of it building type.	Durban, Glenwood	Durban	Register	30°59′16″S 29°59′31″E	An historic, two storied, Edwardian building (a municipal police station up to 1936) in a Baroque Re Architectural style: Baroque Revival style. Type of site: House Previous use: police station. Current use: old age home. This prominent building, at various times a police station, nursing home and private hotel, is a noted landmark in its area, and is an excellent example of it building type.
9/2/408/0001	Fort Nongquai, Eshowe: Zululand Museum	It was built of brick and provided with loopholes, and at the corners there were towers, three storeys high, on which guns could be mounted. This late-nineteenth-century fort is situated on the south-eastern edge of the town of Eshowe. In 1873 the Hlubi tribe under Chief Langalibalele who lived among the foothills of the Drakensberg under the shadow of the mighty Champagne Castle and Cathkin P Type of site: Fort Previous use: fortifications. Current use: museum. On the Gingindlovu – Melmoth road bypass of Eshowe take the turn-off to the east to Gezinzela township.	Eshowe	Eshowe	Provincial Heritage Site	28°53′30″S 31°29′50″E	It was built of brick and provided with loopholes, and at the corners there were towers, three storeys high, on which guns could be mounted. This late-nineteenth-century fort is situated on the south-eastern edge of the town of Eshowe. In 1873 the Hlubi tribe under Chief Langalibalele who lived among the foothills of the Drakensberg under the shadow of the mighty Champagne Castle and Cathkin P Type of site: Fort Previous use: fortifications. Current use: museum. On the Gingindlovu – Melmoth road bypass of Eshowe take the turn-off to the east to Gezinzela township.
9/2/408/0004-001	Fort Kwamondi, Eshowe	Misnomer (according to Eshowe Borough 1994-02-14) – the KwaMondi Mission Station was transformed by From the Tugela the main road follows the picturesque coastal belt as far as Gingindhlovu where it swings to the left towards Eshowe, 24 kilometres further on. On the eastern outskirts of Eshowe there is an old cemetery surrounded by earthworks and a deep Type of site: Fort Previous use: fortifications. Current use: museum. This fort was built during the Zulu War of 1879 by the forces under the command of Col. Pearson.	Eshowe	Eshowe	Provincial Heritage Site	28°53′30″S 31°29′50″E	Misnomer (according to Eshowe Borough 1994-02-14) – the KwaMondi Mission Station was transformed by From the Tugela the main road follows the picturesque coastal belt as far as Gingindhlovu where it swings to the left towards Eshowe, 24 kilometres further on. On the eastern outskirts of Eshowe there is an old cemetery surrounded by earthworks and a deep Type of site: Fort Previous use: fortifications. Current use: museum. This fort was built during the Zulu War of 1879 by the forces under the command of Col. Pearson.
9/2/408/0005	Eshowe Jail, John Ross Highway, Eshowe	Surrounding ring-wall Type of site: Gaol Previous use: other: transit camp and refuge. Current use: prison. This historic complex was erected in 1900 as a second-class prison. During 1901 it served as a trans	Eshowe	Eshowe	Provincial Heritage Site	28°54′17″S 31°28′04″E	Surrounding ring-wall Type of site: Gaol Previous use: other: transit camp and refuge. Current use: prison. This historic complex was erected in 1900 as a second-class prison. During 1901 it served as a trans
9/2/408/0006	Old Residency, Eshowe	Single-storey typical Natal verandah house with original verandah intact; decorative barge boarding. Type of site: Residency Current use: house. The Residency in Eshowe was built in 1894 and first occupied by Resident Commissioner, Sir Charles S	Eshowe	Eshowe	Provincial Heritage Site	28°53′14″S 31°28′12″E	Upload Photo
9/2/408/0010	Eshowe Junior School, 57 Main Street, Eshowe	Type of site: School Current use: school. Built c. 1900 this fine Victorian redbrick school building with its large gable and ornate wood verandah is an excellent example of its type and period. As an institution the school itself, having been established by the Government	Eshowe	Eshowe	Register	31°27′23″S 28°54′07″E	Upload Photo
9/2/409/0002	Greystone, Farm Vegt Lager 801, Estcourt District	Single storey farmhouse with verandas to front and side, wide stone steps leading to main entrance, This impressive Victorian farmhouse, with its ornate wood-decorated veranda, was built in 1873 by Sir Frederick Moor. He was the last Prime Minister of the Colony of Natal. Type of site: House Previous use: house. Current use: house & other: conference centre. This impressive Victorian farmhouse, with its ornate wood-decorated verandah, was built in 1873		Estcourt	Provincial Heritage Site	29°04′10″S 29°48′00″E	Upload Photo
9/2/409/0003	Bulwer Bridge and Old Toll House, Colenso, Estcourt District	The Bulwer Bridge is the oldest stone and steel structure in the Republic, while the Toll House is the oldest building in Colenso and also the only surviving toll house in Natal. Type of site: Bridge, Toll Previous use: other: toll house. Current use: bridge. From the N3 take the Colenso Ladysmith turn-off. Pass the first turn-off to Colenso and take the sec. The Bulwer Bridge is the oldest stone and steel structure in the Republic, while the Toll House is t	Colenso	Estcourt	Provincial Heritage Site	28°44′10″S 29°49′10″E	The Bulwer Bridge is the oldest stone and steel structure in the Republic, while the Toll House is the oldest building in Colenso and also the only surviving toll house in Natal. Type of site: Bridge, Toll Previous use: other: toll house. Current use: bridge. From the N3 take the Colenso Ladysmith turn-off. Pass the first turn-off to Colenso and take the sec. The Bulwer Bridge is the oldest stone and steel structure in the Republic, while the Toll House is t
9/2/409/0004	Fort Durnford, Kemps Road, Estcourt	In 1847 a detachment of the 45th Regiment was sent from Fort Napier in Pietermaritzburg to protect the Boers in that region from the raids of the Bushmen. For their station they chose the flat top of a hill across the Bushman’s River from Saailaer. This w Type of site: Fort Previous use: fortifications and stables. Current use: Museum. Coming into Estcourt from Pietermaritzburg turn right onto Kemps Road just before crossing the railw. This extensive fortification was designed by Colonel A.W. Durnford and erected in 1874.	Estcourt	Estcourt	Provincial Heritage Site	29°00′00″S 29°53′00″E	In 1847 a detachment of the 45th Regiment was sent from Fort Napier in Pietermaritzburg to protect the Boers in that region from the raids of the Bushmen. For their station they chose the flat top of a hill across the Bushman’s River from Saailaer. This w Type of site: Fort Previous use: fortifications and stables. Current use: Museum. Coming into Estcourt from Pietermaritzburg turn right onto Kemps Road just before crossing the railw. This extensive fortification was designed by Colonel A.W. Durnford and erected in 1874. Media related to Fort Durnford at Wikimedia Commons
9/2/409/0009	Bartle House, St Gregory College, Estcourt District	Built of Natal red brick with a hipped corrugated iron roof. Has Oregon sash windows and a wraparound. Established during the 1880s and named after Sir Bartle Frere. Used as headquarters for British for Current use: college. From the N3 take the Colenso turn-off. Head north to Colenso. Immediately one passes Frere on the ri. Bartle House is a well designed and restored building prominently situated in a location where a bui	Frere	Estcourt	Provincial Heritage Site	28°53′37″S 29°46′27″E	Upload Photo
9/2/409/0010	Saailaer, Farm Zaay Lager 1199, Estcourt District	Saailaer, the camp of the well-known Voortrekker leader Gert Maritz, was the furthest south of the laagers at the time of the Great Murder. It stood in a horseshoe bend of the Bushman’s River just east of Estcourt. Fort Durnford on top of a hill to the ea Type of site: Battlefield, House Entering Estcourt from Pmb. cross river and take first right, Drummond St. Becomes Paterson. Right i.	Estcourt, Ward 3	Estcourt	Provincial Heritage Site	29°00′28″S 29°53′16″E	Upload Photo
9/2/409/0013	Ambleside Military Cemetery, Bridledrift, Estcourt District	Type of site: Cemetery Military. The Ambleside Military Cemetery including the monument and graves therein in extent approx. 18 X 12		Estcourt	Provincial Heritage Site	28°44′03″S 29°47′07″E	Upload Photo
9/2/409/0013	Ambleside Military Cemetery, Farm Bridle Drift, Estcourt District	Type of site: Cemetery Military Current use: cemetery.		Estcourt	Provincial Heritage Site	28°44′03″S 29°47′07″E	Upload Photo
9/2/409/0018	Bloukrans Battlefield, Farm Rama 929, Estcourt District: Bloukrans Memorial	About twelve km from Estcourt along the main road to Colenso, opposite Chieveley railway station, a farm road turns off to the north and after crossing the railway line and the Bloukrans River, reaches the Bloukrans Monument. The Voortrekkers who suffered most during the night of Friday, 16 February, were those whose laagers stood at the Moordspruit and the Bloukrans River. The first to be attacked were the laagers of the Liebenbergs, the Rossouws and the Bezuidenhouts; next Type of site: Memorial Previous use: battlefield (on). Current use: memorial. From N3 take Colenso Ladysmith turn-off and head for Colenso. After about 7 km (4 mi) turn right and go abou. Scene of the 'Groot Moord' February 1838, of some 480 Voortrekkers and their servants by Zulu impi;		Estcourt	Provincial Heritage Site	29°50′30″S 28°51′00″E	About twelve km from Estcourt along the main road to Colenso, opposite Chieveley railway station, a farm road turns off to the north and after crossing the railway line and the Bloukrans River, reaches the Bloukrans Monument. The Voortrekkers who suffered most during the night of Friday, 16 February, were those whose laagers stood at the Moordspruit and the Bloukrans River. The first to be attacked were the laagers of the Liebenbergs, the Rossouws and the Bezuidenhouts; next Type of site: Memorial Previous use: battlefield (on). Current use: memorial. From N3 take Colenso Ladysmith turn-off and head for Colenso. After about 7 km (4 mi) turn right and go abou. Scene of the 'Groot Moord' February 1838, of some 480 Voortrekkers and their servants by Zulu impi;
9/2/409/0019	Brynbella Battlefield Stone Wall, Farm Tamboekieskraal 1927 (Farm Zuur Hoek 1928), Estcourt District	Undressed dolorite boulders, comparatively narrow, approx 5 ft (2 m) high and in several places capped by t At least part of the wall was in existence when the farm was acquired by the Symmons family in 1870. This dolomite wall was presumably erected during the period 1870–1880 as boundary between the farms Tamboekies Kraal and Zuurbraak. The Boers, after the Type of site: Battlefield Previous use: battlefield (on). Current use: wall. This dolorite wall was presumably erected during the period 1870–1880 as boundary between the farms		Estcourt	Provincial Heritage Site	29°06′00″S 29°56′00″E	Upload Photo
9/2/409/0020	Marianne Church Ruins, Farm Doveton, Estcourt District	These ruins are the remains of the second Dutch Reformed church erected in Natal and which was in use from 1852 to 1874. It was named after the wife of the then minister of Pietermaritzburg, Dr Faure. Type of site: Church, Ruins Previous use: church. Current use: abandoned. These ruins are the remains of the second Dutch Reformed Church erected in Natal and which was in us		Estcourt	Provincial Heritage Site	29°00′00″S 29°53′00″E	Upload Photo
9/2/409/0021	Old Agricultural Hall, Harding Street, Estcourt	One-and-a-half storeyed hall of unique design; roof of varied rhythms with ventilation turret Architectural style: neo-Classical. Type of site: Hall Agriculture Current use: hall. Entering Escourt from Pmb. Turn right into Harding Street at railway station. Site is immediately on. An impressive sandstone building designed by Kent and Price and officially opened in December 1901; designed in the neo-Classical style the Agricultural Hall forms a unique civic complex together with the adjacent City Hall.	Estcourt, Central	Estcourt	Provincial Heritage Site	29°00′00″S 29°53′00″E	Upload Photo
9/2/409/0022	Settler Cottage, 87 Lorne Street, Estcourt	Small cottage under thatch; open front stoep of shale and sandstone with tiled top and wooden pillar The erf was surveyed in 1863 and it appears the house was built shortly thereafter as it is recorded as one of the earliest house in Estcourt. Architectural style: vernacular cottage. Type of site: House Previous use: house. Current use: shop?. Entering Escourt from Pmb. route becomes Lorne Street after crossing river. 87 is on left. From town. A very rare early settler cottage under thatch, reputed to be the oldest house in Estcourt, this lit	Estcourt, Ward 2	Estcourt	Provincial Heritage Site	29°52′37″S 29°00′40″E	Upload Photo
9/2/410/0002	Karel Landman House, Farm Uithoek 1335, Glencoe District	About 24 kilometres from Ladysmith, along the national road to the north, the road to Elandslaagte and Wasbank turns off sharply to the right. On the farm Uithoek near Wasbank there is a house in which the Voortrekker Karel Landman lived from 1852 to 1875 Architectural style: vernacular cottage. Type of site: House Current use: house. From Wasbank take Glencoe road and turn-off onto farm road to east after 8 km (5 mi). From Glencoe the. The home of Karel Pieter Landman 1795–1875, Voortrekker leader from Cape Colony via Trans-Oranje to		Glencoe	Provincial Heritage Site	28°14′00″S 30°08′00″E	Upload Photo
9/2/412/0002	37-41 Todd (Cnr Wick) Street, Verulam, Inanda District	Previous use: shops. Current use: demolished.	Verulam, Central	Inanda	Provisional Protection	29°38′41″S 31°02′52″E	Upload Photo
9/2/412/0004	Ottawa House, Farm Lot 20 1529, Inanda District	Dominant 4-storey corner tower; entrance via loggia between tower & bedroom wing. Bay & centre windows Ottawa sugar estate begun by Mr Anthony Wilkinson who came to Natal in 1856 Architectural style: Italianate. Type of site: House Current use: vacant. Ottawa House is a well-known and prominent mansion associated with the growth of the sugar industry		Inanda	Provincial Heritage Site	29°41′00″S 30°56′00″E	Upload Photo
9/2/412/0006-012	Ganesha Temple, North Coast Road, Mount Edgecombe	Heavily modulated perimeter wall. Entrance portal surmounted by SIKHALA tower. Cella on axis, square This Hindu temple is the first building by the well-known architect and builder, Kristappa Reddy. The building was erected in 1899 and forms a unique part of South Africa's cultural and architectural heritage. Architectural style: Hindu. Type of site: Temple Current use: temple. This Hindu temple is the first building by the well-known architect and builder, Kristappa Reddy. Th	Mount Edgecombe	Inanda	Provincial Heritage Site	31°02′06″S 29°42′05″E	Upload Photo
9/2/412/0007	Shri Jagannath Puri Temple, Belvedere Road, Tongaat	23m high tower (shikhara), single entrance capped by an octangenal squat shape and a dome. This temple was constructed by the late Pandit Shiskishan Maharaj, a devout Hindu priest and Sanskrit scholar who immigrated to South Africa in 1895. He constructed this structure of 21 metres using traditional primitive building methods, African labour a Architectural style: Nagava. Type of site: Temple Current use: temple. This richly ornate temple was constructed by Pandit Shiskishan Maharaj, a Hindu priest who immigrated to South Africa in 1895. The temple, surrounded by a moat, was dedicated to the war like god Jagannathi.	Tongaat	Inanda	Provincial Heritage Site	29°34′42″S 31°05′39″E	Upload Photo
9/2/412/0009	Narainsamy Temple, Inanda Road, Newlands	The temple, which stands on a ridge north of the Umgeni river near Durban, has a prominent white spire visible from a great distance. The whole building is finished in white, in contrast to many others which are decorated in various colours. The stucco mo The Narainsamy Temple, Newlands, was founded by one Narainsamy in 1896. It is controlled by a family trust created by him. The designer and builder of the temple was Kristappa Reddy, whose main contribution to temple architecture was this temple with its Architectural style: Traditional Indian. Type of site: Temple Current use: temple. From N2 north take off-ramp to M21, Inanda Road, and turn left to head inland. The Temple is on the. Founded by one Narainsamy in 1896 and designed and built by Kristappa Reddy, this temple has a finel	Newlands, Newlands East	Inanda	Provincial Heritage Site	28°31′50″S 30°53′45″E	The temple, which stands on a ridge north of the Umgeni river near Durban, has a prominent white spire visible from a great distance. The whole building is finished in white, in contrast to many others which are decorated in various colours. The stucco mo The Narainsamy Temple, Newlands, was founded by one Narainsamy in 1896. It is controlled by a family trust created by him. The designer and builder of the temple was Kristappa Reddy, whose main contribution to temple architecture was this temple with its Architectural style: Traditional Indian. Type of site: Temple Current use: temple. From N2 north take off-ramp to M21, Inanda Road, and turn left to head inland. The Temple is on the. Founded by one Narainsamy in 1896 and designed and built by Kristappa Reddy, this temple has a finel
9/2/412/0012/001	John Dube House, Ohlange Institution, Inanda District	Single storey Natal verandah house with corrugated-iron roof, redbrick walls and gable at each end o This house was the home of John Dube, founder of the Ohlange Institution and Ilanga newspaper. Dube Type of site: House Current use: house. The home of John Dube, first president of the ANC, a pioneer educationist, black editor and politica		Inanda	Provincial Heritage Site	29°41′50″S 30°57′27″E	Upload Photo
9/2/412/0014	Ottawa Estate Shree Emperumal Temple, Ottawa, Inanda District	Type of site: Temple Current use: temple. Erected in 1892, this temple is a typical small cane workers temple in the South Indian, Dravidian style. Erected by indentured labourers it serves an important religious and social function in Ottawa. Typical of small Dravidian temples, the structure h	Ottawa	Inanda	Register	29°40′20″S 31°02′20″E	Upload Photo
9/2/415/0001	Hindu Thirukootam and Shree Ganaser Temple, 113 Forbes Street, Ladysmith	Natal veranda house of hipped roof and flared veranda roof with attached SIKHARA at the rear; a very Architectural style: Natal colonial + Indian. Type of site: Temple Current use: temple & school. Entering Ladysmith from Pmb. Follow the through road through the CBD until reaching Queen Street. Tun. A declared national monument	Ladysmith, Central	Klip River	Provincial Heritage Site	28°33′38″S 29°47′08″E	Upload Photo
9/2/415/0002	Keer Weder, 25 Keate Street, Ladysmith	Symmetrical double gabled villa on a parilion plan with linking lean-to veranda and gablet on centre Built before 1900 by Mr David Sparks, three times mayor of Ladysmith, the property was known as ROSE Architectural style: Victorian villa. Type of site: House Previous use: house. Current use: offices. One of the finest Victorian houses in Ladysmith (in urgent need of repair)	Ladysmith, Central	Klip River	Provincial Heritage Site	29°46′45″S 28°33′29″E	Upload Photo
9/2/415/0004	Hime Bridge, Farm Platberg 1241, Klip River District	Type of site: Bridge Current use: bridge. This bridge is the best preserved and least threatened of the bridges which formed the first major roadworks linking Natal with the Transvaal.		Klip River	Register	28°21′39″S 30°00′40″E	Upload Photo
9/2/415/0008	Platrand Battlefield, Farm Fourie's Kraal 1183 (Riet Kuil 1067), Klip River District	Five kilometres southwest of Ladysmith there is a long, low hill, about five kilometres long and about 200 metres high. It played an important part in the Anglo-Boer War of 1899–1902. It was known to the Boers as Piatrand and to the British as Wagon Hill. Type of site: Battlefield Previous use: battlefield. Current use: other: farmland. From the centre of Ladysmith take the route to Colenso and Pietermaritzburg, but just before turning. Historical interest – the crown of this hill was a British defensive site during the Anglo-Boer War,		Klip River	Provincial Heritage Site	28°35′10″S 29°45′10″E	Five kilometres southwest of Ladysmith there is a long, low hill, about five kilometres long and about 200 metres high. It played an important part in the Anglo-Boer War of 1899–1902. It was known to the Boers as Piatrand and to the British as Wagon Hill. Type of site: Battlefield Previous use: battlefield. Current use: other: farmland. From the centre of Ladysmith take the route to Colenso and Pietermaritzburg, but just before turning. Historical interest – the crown of this hill was a British defensive site during the Anglo-Boer War, Media related to Platrand Memorials at Wikimedia Commons
9/2/415/0008-001	Platrand Burgher Monument, Ladysmith, Klipriver District	0		Klipriver	Provincial Heritage Site	28°35′02″S 29°46′04″E	0
9/2/415/0008-002	Wagon Hill Cemetery, Ladysmith, Klipriver District	Type of site: Cemetery.	Ladysmith	Klipriver	Provincial Heritage Site	28°36′03″S 29°45′09″E	Upload Photo
9/2/415/0008-003	Memorials, Wagon Point, Klipriver District	Type of site: Memorial.		Klipriver	Provincial Heritage Site	28°31′50″S 30°53′45″E	Type of site: Memorial.
9/2/415/0008-004	Caesar's Camp Cemetery, Platrand, Klipriver District	Type of site: Cemetery.		Klipriver	Provincial Heritage Site	28°31′50″S 30°53′45″E	Upload Photo
9/2/415/0008-005	Manchester Memorial, Platrand, Klipriver District	Type of site: Memorial.		Klipriver	Provincial Heritage Site	28°31′50″S 30°53′45″E	Upload Photo
9/2/415/0008-006	Manchester Regiment Graves, Platrand, Klipriver District	0		Klipriver	Provincial Heritage Site	28°31′50″S 30°53′45″E	Upload Photo
9/2/415/0018	Llandaff Oratory, Van Reenen, Klip River District	This red brick chapel was erected in 1925 by Joseph Maynard Mathew, at the time landdrost in Natal, to house a memorial plaque in memory of his son Llandaff, who died during the Burnside colliery disaster. Current use: church and memorial. on the N3 heading towards the OFS, a few metres from the provincial boundary turn left after the gar. This red brick chapel was erected in 1925 by Joseph Maynard Mathew, at the time landrost in Natal, t	Van Reenen	Klip River	Provincial Heritage Site	28°22′30″S 29°22′30″E	This red brick chapel was erected in 1925 by Joseph Maynard Mathew, at the time landdrost in Natal, to house a memorial plaque in memory of his son Llandaff, who died during the Burnside colliery disaster. Current use: church and memorial. on the N3 heading towards the OFS, a few metres from the provincial boundary turn left after the gar. This red brick chapel was erected in 1925 by Joseph Maynard Mathew, at the time landrost in Natal, t Media related to LLandaff Oratory at Wikimedia Commons
9/2/415/0019	Railway Institute, 316 Murchison (Cnr Albert) Street, Ladysmith	Double-storey H-shaped plan, two additional wings projecting to Murchison Street to contain two-tier Ladysmith has an important railways associated history. This double-storeyed Victorian sandstone building, the corner-stone of which was laid on 25 September 1903 by Joseph Bayngs, was erected by the then Natal Government Railways as recreation centre for Architectural style: Victorian institutional. Type of site: residential / recreational Current use: clubhouse. Entering Ladysmith from Pmb. follow the trough road and turn left into Murchison Street upon entering. Declared a National Monument 24 June 1983	Ladysmith, Central	Klip River	Provincial Heritage Site	29°47′03″S 28°33′19″E	Upload Photo
9/2/415/0022	Soofie Mosque and Maddressa, 41 Mosque (Soofie) Road, Ladysmith	A rusticated base to a roofscape of minarets and domes, a delightful composition of Islamic architecture. The builder Jamaloodeen, came from India as a 14-year-old boy. He learnt mosque building by observing Architectural style: Islamic. Type of site: Mosque Current use: mosque. A landmark of delight	Ladysmith, Rose Park	Klip River	Provincial Heritage Site	29°46′41″S 28°34′14″E	A rusticated base to a roofscape of minarets and domes, a delightful composition of Islamic architecture. The builder Jamaloodeen, came from India as a 14-year-old boy. He learnt mosque building by observing Architectural style: Islamic. Type of site: Mosque Current use: mosque. A landmark of delight
9/2/415/0025	Dutch Corps Monument, Elandslaagte Battlefield, Farm Brakfontein 1046, Kilp River District	This memorial, which was designed by G. Moerdyk of Pretoria, was built by the firm Barker and Nel of Volksrust and was erected by the citizens of The Netherlands in memory of members of the Dutch Corps who died during the battle at Elandslaagte on 21 Octo Type of site: Memorial Current use: memorial. From Ladysmith to Newcastle on R23 turn off to Wasbank R621. After about 2.5 km (2 mi) and just before sharp.		Klip River	Provincial Heritage Site	28°25′20″S 30°58′40″E	Upload Photo
9/2/415/0026	Elandslaagte Battlefield, Farm Brakfontein 1046, Klip River District	The battle at Elandslaagte on 21 October 1899 was the second action of the Anglo-Boer War (1899–1902). In this battle the Boers lost 60 men, while 140 were wounded and 200 were taken prisoner. British casualties numbered 50 dead and 205 wounded. Type of site: Battlefield Current use: memorial. Ladysmith – Newcastle on R23 turn to Wasbank R621. After about 2.5 km (2 mi), just before sharp turn north g. The battle at Elandslaagte on 21 October 1899 was the second action of the Anglo-Boer War (1899–1902		Klip River	Provincial Heritage Site	28°25′30″S 30°58′40″E	Upload Photo
9/2/415/0027	Town Hall, Murchison (Cnr Queen) Street, Ladysmith	Murchison Street front marked by portico & clocktower, cortile surrounded by arcade of slender Doric This magnificent Town Hall, the corner-stone of which was laid in August 1893, was designed and built by the architects Walker and Singleton. The building was badly damaged during the siege of Ladysmith (1899–1900), but was restored by Lucas in 1900. Architectural style: Renaissance revival / Union Period Baroque. Type of site: Town Hall Current use: town hall. Entering Ladysmith from Pmb. Follow the trough road and turn left into Murchison Street upon entering. The clocktower and the adjacent rooms were declared National Monuments on10.8.79	Ladysmith, Central	Klip River	Provincial Heritage Site	29°46′51″S 28°33′35″E	Murchison Street front marked by portico & clocktower, cortile surrounded by arcade of slender Doric This magnificent Town Hall, the corner-stone of which was laid in August 1893, was designed and built by the architects Walker and Singleton. The building was badly damaged during the siege of Ladysmith (1899–1900), but was restored by Lucas in 1900. Architectural style: Renaissance revival / Union Period Baroque. Type of site: Town Hall Current use: town hall. Entering Ladysmith from Pmb. Follow the trough road and turn left into Murchison Street upon entering. The clocktower and the adjacent rooms were declared National Monuments on10.8.79 Media related to Ladysmith Town Hall at Wikimedia Commons
9/2/415/0028	Castor and Pollux, 6,3 in. RML Howitzer, Ladysmith	These two guns are well known amongst historians and others interested in the history of the Anglo-Boer war	Ladysmith	Klip River	Heritage Object	28°33′33″S 29°46′51″E	These two guns are well known amongst historians and others interested in the history of the Anglo-Boer war Media related to Castor and Pollux guns at Wikimedia Commons
9/2/415/0030	Dutch Reformed Church, 103 Murchison Street, Ladysmith	Exterior to Murchison street suggestive of a basilican plan and section. In fact, church has octagon The NGK congregation was founded in 1854. Sited on a double-sized property (the size originally rese Architectural style: neo Romanesque/Byzantine. Type of site: Church Current use: religious. The architect, Moerdijk, promoted Afrikaans culture and specialised in Dutch Reformed Church building	Ladysmith, Central	Klip River	Provincial Heritage Site	29°46′45″S 28°33′43″E	Upload Photo
9/2/415/0033	The Residency, 11-13 Wright Road, Ladysmith	Ladysmith prototype: acknowledges local climatic conditions; for its construction locally available Official residence of the resident magistrate Architectural style: Victorian. Type of site: Residency Current use: house. As the most prominent prototype of a vernacular housing style which was designed to suit climatic co	Ladysmith, Egerton	Klip River	Provincial Heritage Site	29°47′29″S 28°32′50″E	Upload Photo
9/2/417/0001/001	Cedara College, Lions River District: Old Hostel Building	Previous use: offices & other: living quarters, lecture rooms, dining facilities, etc. Current use: hostel & lecture halls. From Pmb north on N3. Off at Winterskloof/Mount Michael after Hilton. Right over motorway, about 2 km (1 mi). This building housed the first Natal Govt Agricultural College and Experimental Station and served a		Lions River	Provincial Heritage Site	29°32′50″S 30°16′00″E	Upload Photo
9/2/417/0002	Tweedie Research Station, Farm Riversdale 950, Lions River District	U-shaped building, verandah columns, corrugated iron roof and stone plinths. Built in 1867 by Mr George Ross, well-known Natal farmer, the farmstead has had numerous owners over Architectural style: Vernacular style. Previous use: house. Current use: other: research station. From the N3 heading north turn off to Tweedie just after passing Howick. Turn left to Tweedie. After. The farmstead has been owned by various well-known Natal figures over the years and is a good example		Lions River	Provincial Heritage Site	29°28′40″S 30°11′10″E	Upload Photo
9/2/417/0003-001	Fairfell Farmstead, Shafton Road, Howick	Steeply pitched hipped roof with dormers and gabled extensions. Roof flared over veranda of west wing. Built for Sir George Morris Sutton, 5th Prime Minister of Colony of Natal, 1903–04. Architectural style: Victorian style. Type of site: Farm Complex Current use: residence. A fine example of rural architecture of Natal, with wrap-around verandahs. Importance is enhanced du	Howick	Lions River	Provincial Heritage Site	29°28′44″S 30°14′24″E	Upload Photo
9/2/417/0005	Owthorne House, Farm Bosch Hoek 973, Lions River District	Plastered brickwork, corrugated iron roof (originally thatch) with two small dormers on either side. Built in 1882 by William Charles Shaw, British settler who farmed in the Dargle and also managed a n Architectural style: Vernacular style. Type of site: House Current use: house. Historical and architectural interest – the farmhouse was built by Wiliam Charles Shaw, one of an im	The Dargle	Lions River	Provincial Heritage Site	29°28′22″S 30°06′22″E	Upload Photo
9/2/417/0007	Howick Waterfall, Falls View Drive, Howick	The township of Howick is situated just off the main road, 23 kilometres north-west of Pietermaritzburg. There, at an early stage of its journey from the rolling foothills of the Drakensberg to the Indian Ocean at Durban, the Umgeni plunges more than 95 m Type of site: Waterfall Current use: waterfall. Entering Howick from Pmb. From Main Street take first right at war memorial after crossing the Umgen. 95 metres high and situated close to the village of Howick, established at the old travellers' river	Howick	Lions River	Provincial Heritage Site	29°29′12″S 30°14′19″E	The township of Howick is situated just off the main road, 23 kilometres north-west of Pietermaritzburg. There, at an early stage of its journey from the rolling foothills of the Drakensberg to the Indian Ocean at Durban, the Umgeni plunges more than 95 m Type of site: Waterfall Current use: waterfall. Entering Howick from Pmb. From Main Street take first right at war memorial after crossing the Umgen. 95 metres high and situated close to the village of Howick, established at the old travellers' river Media related to Howick Falls at Wikimedia Commons
9/2/417/0008	Tweedie Hall, Farm Tweedie Hall 11880, Lions River District	Double-storey Victorial red brick house; front and side verandas and upper floor balcony; bay window Built by James Morton 1893 and passed down through the family to the present day, the house was once Type of site: House Current use: house. From the N3 heading north turn off to Tweedie just after passing Howick. Turn left to Tweedie. 1,2km. Historical and architectural interest – designed by Street-Wilson and built by a Mr James, for James	Tweedie	Lions River	Provincial Heritage Site	29°29′30″S 30°10′40″E	Upload Photo
9/2/417/0009	Howick Clinic, 24 Morling Street, Howick	Hipped roof, gabled projections symmetrical abort the recessed veranda. Segment arch soldiered linto Apparently built for George Ford, builder/owner of the Falls Hotel. Served as local museum. This house, built during the late nineteenth century, is one of the oldest buildings in the Natal Colonial style still in existence in this area. Architectural style: Victorian style. Type of site: Clinic Previous use: house. Current use: clinic. Entering Howick from Pmb. and crossing Umgeni River take first left into Morling Street Clinic is on. Built during the late 19th century, this is one of the oldest buildings in the Natal Colonial style	Howick, Central	Lions River	Provincial Heritage Site	29°29′16″S 30°13′53″E	Upload Photo
9/2/417/0013	St John's Gowrie Presbyterian Church, Nottingham Road, Lions River District	This church, which was the first to be erected in Upper Umgeni, was built in 1884–1885. It stands on a portion of the historic farm 'Gowie' which was donated by Byrne Settler, John King, who arrived in Natal on the sailing ship Henry Tanner in 1849. The Type of site: Church Current use: religious. From N3 north of Pietermaritzburg take the Nottingham Road turn-off and travel towards Nottingham Ro.	Nottingham Road	Lions River	Provincial Heritage Site	29°21′10″S 29°59′50″E	Upload Photo
9/2/417/0017	Aird Farmhouse, Farm Petrusstroom No.954, Lions River District	Single Storey, L-shaped building. Verandas to front and one side and at the rear the L-shape forms a Built in c1882 by James Clark, one of the first five homesteads in the Midlands. James Clark was a Architectural style: 'Natal verandah house'. Type of site: House Current use: house. Built c1882 by the transport rider James Clark this originally L-shaped, stone farmstead with hipped corrugated roof and characteristic cast-iron front verandah is recognised as one of the important homes of the Natal Midlands. Though altered and painted		Lions River	Register	28°31′50″S 30°53′45″E	Upload Photo
9/2/418/0001	Old Fort Police Station, Rood Street, Stanger	Type of site: Police Station Current use: police station.	Stanger	Lower Tugela	Register	29°20′50″S 31°17′04″E	Upload Photo
9/2/418/0002	Shaka Memorial, King Shaka Street, Stanger	The striking Chaka memorial stands in Couper Street in Stanger, 74 kilometres north of Durban along the North Coast Road. Chaka was the outstanding figure in a long succession of Zulu chiefs. Almost two metres tall and well pro portioned, he was endowed with great physical strength and outstanding courage. He had a searching and creative intellect, but he was domineering and Type of site: Memorial Current use: memorial. Monument, made in Newcastle, erected in 1932 on the alleged site of King Shaka's grave; not official	Stanger	Lower Tugela	Provincial Heritage Site	29°20′24″S 31°17′40″E	The striking Chaka memorial stands in Couper Street in Stanger, 74 kilometres north of Durban along the North Coast Road. Chaka was the outstanding figure in a long succession of Zulu chiefs. Almost two metres tall and well pro portioned, he was endowed with great physical strength and outstanding courage. He had a searching and creative intellect, but he was domineering and Type of site: Memorial Current use: memorial. Monument, made in Newcastle, erected in 1932 on the alleged site of King Shaka's grave; not official
9/2/418/0003	Stanger South School, Balcomb (Cnr Albert Luthuli) Street, Stanger	Victorian school building with pavilion plan, recessed veranda bay window and 6/6 sliding sash wind H R Dukes opened two rooms in his large house as Stanger's first European school in 1895, additional Architectural style: Victorian. Type of site: School Current use: school. Historical – two rooms of a private house were opened as Stanger's first European school 5 August 18	Stanger	Lower Tugela	Provincial Heritage Site	29°20′31″S 31°17′28″E	Upload Photo
9/2/418/0009	Fort Pearson, Farm Williamsom 12871, Lower Tugela District	Site of British encampment during Anglo-Zulu War 9879 The main road to the north crosses the Tugela River 21 kilometres from Stanger. About one kilometre before one reaches the bridge, a gravel road turns off to the right and rises steeply up a hill near the river. There, eight km down-stream from Bond’s Dri Type of site: Fort Current use: fortifications. Of historical significance being constructed by Col Charles Knight Pearson during the 1879 Anglo-Zul		Lower Tugela	Provincial Heritage Site	29°12′50″S 31°26′00″E	Site of British encampment during Anglo-Zulu War 9879 The main road to the north crosses the Tugela River 21 kilometres from Stanger. About one kilometre before one reaches the bridge, a gravel road turns off to the right and rises steeply up a hill near the river. There, eight km down-stream from Bond’s Dri Type of site: Fort Current use: fortifications. Of historical significance being constructed by Col Charles Knight Pearson during the 1879 Anglo-Zul Media related to Fort Pearson at Wikimedia Commons
9/2/418/0010	Ultimatum Tree, Farm Lot 5 2612, Lower Tugela District	Ficus Sonderi (wild fig/Sycamore Fig) tree, being progeny of original historic tree. The 'Ultimatum Tree' stands on the right bank of the Tugela River at the site of the old point just below Fort Pearson. In 1878 the differences between Cetshwayo and the British Governments of Natal and the Transvaal reached a climax. The main point of con Type of site: Tree Current use: tree. Site where ultimatum leading to the outbreak of the Anglo-Zulu War was delivered to Zulu King Cetswa		Lower Tugela	Provincial Heritage Site	29°12′50″S 31°26′10″E	Upload Photo
9/2/418/0011	Kearsney Methodist Chapel, Farm Kearsney 2201, Lower Tugela District	East-West aligned church of 5 bays, each separated by a wide, battered buttress and slit windows wit This church building was built by Mr A. Rovik and was completed early in 1908. It was consecrated on 23 May 1908. Built at the instigation of Sir Liege Hulett, who was a Methodist lay preacher in the Verulam circuit Architectural style: Arts and Crafts. Type of site: Chapel Current use: church. From Greytown on R74 pass Mapumulo then Mount Albert, Royden & Mandalay on left. Take next left after. Of historical and architectural interest – designed by Stott & Kirby to serve the growing community	Kearsney	Lower Tugela	Provincial Heritage Site	29°17′11″S 31°14′17″E	Upload Photo
9/2/418/0013	Convention Tree, Tugela Station, Lower Tugela District	Mistakenly declared as the 'Ultimatum Tree' and redeclared as a 'fine botanical specimen', this tree Type of site: Tree Current use: tree. Declared as a 'fine botanical specimen' after it was discovered that the tree had mistakenly been de	Tugela Station	Lower Tugela	Provisional Protection	29°10′23″S 31°24′27″E	Upload Photo
9/2/418/0014	Isivundu House, Farm Isivundu 1954, Lower Tugela District	Longitudinal house with 'witch's' tower at entrance. Perimeter verandah, very large 1/1 sliding sash The mansion dates from about 1900 and is one of the few remaining so-called "sugar palaces" in Natal. Architectural style: Queen Anne verandah house. Type of site: Farm Complex Current use: house. From Greytown on R74 pass Mapumulo and Kearsney. Half km after turn to Doringkop see turn to Isivund. Of historical and architectural interest – the mansion dates from c1900 and is one of the few remain		Lower Tugela	Provincial Heritage Site	29°18′28″S 31°14′59″E	Upload Photo
9/2/418/0015	Morewood Sugar Mill Memorial Garden, Farm Compensation 868, Lower Tugela District	Gardens established by the SA Sugar Assoc in 1951 to commemorate the pioneer work of Edmend Morewood The memorial garden marks the place where the first sugar mill in South Africa was erected and where the South African sugar industry had its origin. The founder of the sugar industry in Natal was Edmund Morewood, one of the early settlers in Durban. When Architectural style: Utilitarian. Type of site: Garden of Remembrance Current use: memorial garden. On the N3 heading north from Durban take the Ballito Bay turn-off north of Tongaat and head inland. Morewood Memorial Garden is the site which commemorates the origins of South African sugar production in SA.		Lower Tugela	Provincial Heritage Site	29°30′01″S 31°10′14″E	Upload Photo
9/2/418/0016	Bogmore, Farm Compensation 868, Lower Tugela District	Type of site: House Current use: hotel. Built between 1903 and 1905 by Horace Hulett, son of Sir Liege Hulett, founder of Hullett Sugar, this house was until recently owned by the Hulett family. It is now the property of a Mr Patrick Shorten, who runs it as 'Shortens Country House', an upmark		Lower Tugela	Register	29°30′30″S 31°11′53″E	Upload Photo
9/2/419/0004	St Lucia Lighthouse, Farm State Land 7638, Lower Umfolozi District	Original cast-iron tower and optic transferred to Cape St Lucia from Mahlongwa Head near Umkomaas af Type of site: Lighthouse Current use: lighthouse. Supplied by Chance Brothers of Smethwick, England in 1892, this cast-iron structure originally stood at Mahlongwa Head, but was moved to St Lucia in 1906 after a new system was devised for marking the Aliwal Shoal. It is the sister of the Port Shepstone		Lower Umfolozi	Register	28°31′08″S 32°23′50″E	Upload Photo
9/2/420/0001	Mpande's Nodwengu Royal Homestead and Grave, Ulundi, Mahlabatini	Nothing left of the traditional Zulu settlement. The Zulu Chief Senzangakhona had three sons who succeeded one another as paramount rulers of the Zulus: Chaka, Dingane and Mpande. Chaka was murdered by his brothers Dingane and Mhlangana in 1828. Dingane was afraid of Mhlangana so he killed him, but he t Type of site: Royal Grave or Chief Current use: kraal & monument. Royal residence of King Mpande occupied by him from 1840 to 1872; his burial place.	Ulundi	Mahlabatini	Provincial Heritage Site	28°18′00″S 31°25′30″E	Upload Photo
9/2/420/0002-002	Ondini, Ulundi, Mahlabatini District	Partial reconstruction of the largest of Cetshwayo's homesteads on open grassland site sloping downh The Battle of Ulundi took place in 1879 between the British and Cetshwayo’s Zulu army. The battlefield was very close to the site of Mpande’s kraal, Nodwengu, and barely three kilometres due west of Cetshwayo’s kraal, Ondini. The Zulu War broke out in the Current use: monument. From Ulundi take road to Umfolozi Game Reserve. Site is on north side of the road, a few kilometres. After his part in Mpande's successful first incursion into Swaziland in the mid-1840s, Cetshwayo, th	Ulundi	Mahlabatini	Provincial Heritage Site	28°19′00″S 31°27′30″E	Upload Photo
9/2/420/0003	Ulundi Battlefield, Mahlabatini District	The Battle of Ulundi took place in 1879 between the British and Cetshwayo’s Zulu army. The battlefield was very close to the site of Mpande’s kraal, Nodwengu, and barely three kilometres due west of Cetshwayo’s kraal, Ondini. The Zulu War broke out in the Type of site: Battlefield Current use: monument. From Ulundi take road to Umfolozi Game Reserve. The domed memorial is clearly visible on north side. Battlesite where Cetshwayo's warriors were defeated by the British on 4 July 1879.		Mahlabatini	Provincial Heritage Site	28°18′40″S 31°25′30″E	Upload Photo
9/2/422/0001	Helen Bridge, Weston, Mooi River District	Type of site: Bridge Current use: bridge. The first bridge built north of Pietermaritzburg, situated at the old Voortrekker and pioneer crossi	Mooi River	Mooi River	Provincial Heritage Site	29°12′40″S 30°01′20″E	Upload Photo
9/2/422/0003	St Theresa's Roman Catholic Church, Westacre Road, Mooi River	Type of site: Church Current use: religious.	Mooi River	Mooi River	Register	29°12′22″S 30°00′03″E	Upload Photo
9/2/422/0004	Garden of Remembrance, MacFarlane Street, Mooi River	Type of site: Garden of Remembrance. A military hospital was established in Mooi River in 1900 and those who died were buried in the cemetery.	Mooi River	Mooi River	Provincial Heritage Site	29°31′00″S 30°00′06″E	Upload Photo
9/2/422/0006/001	Weston Agricultural College, Farm Weston Training School 13981, Mooi River District: Old Medical Officers and Nurses Residences	Type of site: School Current use: college. From Pietermaritzburg west on N2 take Mooi River turnoff and turn left then right at T. After about. (One of) These two wood-and-iron houses, which were erected in 1900, are relics of the British Military		Mooi River	Provincial Heritage Site	29°13′00″S 30°02′00″E	Upload Photo
9/2/422/0006/002	Weston Agricultural College, Farm Weston Training School 13981, Mooi River District: Old Commanding Officer's Quarters	These two wood-and-iron houses, which were erected in 1900, are relics of the British Military Remount Depot that was established at Weston near Mooi River shortly before the outbreak of the Anglo-Boer War (1899–1902). Type of site: School Current use: college. From Pietermaritzburg west on N2 take Mooi River turnoff and turn left then right at T. After about. (One of) These two wood-and-iron houses, which were erected in 1900, are relics of the British Military		Mooi River	Provincial Heritage Site	29°13′00″S 30°02′00″E	Upload Photo
9/2/423/0001	Matatiele Museum, High Street, Matatiele	A stone building with a corrugated iron roof at the back facade and a stepped gable in the front fac Erected by John Hutt for Mr Barker and Mr Heyns and used as a garage. 1925 the building was bought b Type of site: commercial Previous use: workshop & church hall & post office. Current use: museum. This building is one of the few conservation worthy buildings in the town and is also a well-known l	Matatiele	Mount Currie	Provincial Heritage Site	28°31′50″S 30°53′45″E	Upload Photo
9/2/423/0002	Old Town Hall, Main Street, Kokstad	Impressive smaller town hall with colonnaded, gabled front entrance portico; two wings to either sid Built as town hall and municipal offices and officially opened 1901-01-01; interior modernised for p Architectural style: Colonial town hall. Type of site: Town Hall Previous use: town hall & offices. Current use: library. Designed by Architect Arthur Fyfe, the building is a good example of early Colonial architecture, is	Kokstad	Mount Currie	Provincial Heritage Site	30°32′50″S 29°25′26″E	Upload Photo
9/2/423/0007	Dower House, Dower (Cnr Main) Street, Kokstad	This building is historically the most important in Kokstad. This is not only because it was the first	Kokstad	Mount Currie	Provisional Protection	30°33′07″S 29°25′35″E	Upload Photo
9/2/423/0008	Bandstand, Main Street, Kokstad	Flat site in Town Hall gardens; Has beautifully detailed cast-iron work; Has a green roof, white pil The fountain which was formerly in the centre was moved to the lower Town gardens some years ago. This Victorian cast-iron bandstand dates from 1912. It was donated to the Town Council by the engineers who were responsible for Kokstad's water Type of site: recreational Previous use: bandstand. Current use: pavilion. Historical and Architectural interest – This Victorian cast-iron bandstand dates from 191	Kokstad	Mount Currie	Provincial Heritage Site	30°32′52″S 29°25′26″E	Flat site in Town Hall gardens; Has beautifully detailed cast-iron work; Has a green roof, white pil The fountain which was formerly in the centre was moved to the lower Town gardens some years ago. This Victorian cast-iron bandstand dates from 1912. It was donated to the Town Council by the engineers who were responsible for Kokstad's water Type of site: recreational Previous use: bandstand. Current use: pavilion. Historical and Architectural interest – This Victorian cast-iron bandstand dates from 191
9/2/423/0009	Kokstad Museum, 104 Main Street, Kokstad	This building with its Victorian and Edwardian characteristics dates from 1908. It was used as the Public Library until 1982. Previous use: community hall & offices & library. Current use: Museum. This building with its Victorian and Edwardian characteristics dates from 1908. It was used as the Pu	Kokstad	Mount Currie	Provincial Heritage Site	29°25′27″S 30°32′49″E	This building with its Victorian and Edwardian characteristics dates from 1908. It was used as the Public Library until 1982. Previous use: community hall & offices & library. Current use: Museum. This building with its Victorian and Edwardian characteristics dates from 1908. It was used as the Pu
9/2/427/0001	Raffia Palms, Lot 162, Mtunzini	An extensive grove of raphia palms (R. australis) established in 1916 from seed. The North Coast Road divides at Gingindhlovu; the branch to the left goes to Eshowe and Zululand; the one to the right continues northwards up the coast. The village of Mtunzini lies on the coastal road about 19 kilometres from Gingindhlovu. Only a few hu Type of site: Tree Current use: trees. From the centre of Mtunzini follow the route to the Umlalazi nature reserve. After crossing the rail. This extensive grove of raffia palms (R. australis) was established at Mtunzini in 1916 from seed sen	Mtunzini	Mtunzini	Provincial Heritage Site	28°57′30″S 31°45′40″E	An extensive grove of raphia palms (R. australis) established in 1916 from seed. The North Coast Road divides at Gingindhlovu; the branch to the left goes to Eshowe and Zululand; the one to the right continues northwards up the coast. The village of Mtunzini lies on the coastal road about 19 kilometres from Gingindhlovu. Only a few hu Type of site: Tree Current use: trees. From the centre of Mtunzini follow the route to the Umlalazi nature reserve. After crossing the rail. This extensive grove of raffia palms (R. australis) was established at Mtunzini in 1916 from seed sen
9/2/427/0002	Tugela Battlefield, Lot 14 Farm Tugela 10600, Mtunzini District	Type of site: Battlefield Current use: monument. On 17 April 1838 a number of British settlers and their auxiliaries went to the aid of Voortrekkers		Mtunzini	Provincial Heritage Site	29°10′10″S 31°26′50″E	Upload Photo
9/2/427/0005	Fort Tenedos, Farm Alliance 14837, Mtunzini District	Fort Tenedos is situated on the left bank of the Tugela River, opposite Fort Pearson. It was built in 1879 and, together with Fort Pearson, guarded the point over the river. It was garrisoned by men from HMS Tenedos. Colonel Pearson’s column passed this wa Type of site: Fort Previous use: fortifications. Current use: abandoned. The fort played a major role in the Anglo-Zulu War 1879, being the first fortification constructed b		Mtunzini	Provincial Heritage Site	29°12′30″S 31°26′10″E	Upload Photo
9/2/429/0001	O'Neil's Cottage, Farm Stonewall 3109, Newcastle District	This historic house stands on the western side of the main road between Ingogo and Charlestown. It is situated at the foot of the Amajuba Mountain, 35 kilometres from Newcastle and 11 km (7 mi) from Charlestown. It is planned in the form of a cross and is built... Type of site: House Previous use: house. Current use: museum. From Newcastle head north towards Volksrust on the R23. About 20 km (12 mi) from Newcastle and at the bottom. It was in this cottage that negotiations took place during a number of meetings in March 1881, …		Newcastle	Provincial Heritage Site	27°30′00″S 29°51′20″E	This historic house stands on the western side of the main road between Ingogo and Charlestown. It is situated at the foot of the Amajuba Mountain, 35 kilometres from Newcastle and 11 km (7 mi) from Charlestown. It is planned in the form of a cross and is built... Type of site: House Previous use: house. Current use: museum. From Newcastle head north towards Volksrust on the R23. About 20 km (12 mi) from Newcastle and at the bottom. It was in this cottage that negotiations took place during a number of meetings in March 1881, … Media related to Peace of 1881 at Wikimedia Commons
9/2/429/0002	Town Hall, Scott Street, Newcastle	The city hall was designed by William Lucas and erected in 1898. It is one of the few remaining colonial buildings in Newcastle. Architectural style: Colonial town hall. Type of site: Town Hall. Current use: hall. Entering Newcastle from Ladysmith take Allen Street turn-off from bypass and turn left into Scott St. Of architectural and local historical interest – The city hall was designed by William Lucas.	Newcastle, Central	Newcastle	Provincial Heritage Site	27°45′27″S 29°55′54″E	The city hall was designed by William Lucas and erected in 1898. It is one of the few remaining colonial buildings in Newcastle. Architectural style: Colonial town hall. Type of site: Town Hall. Current use: hall. Entering Newcastle from Ladysmith take Allen Street turn-off from bypass and turn left into Scott St. Of architectural and local historical interest – The city hall was designed by William Lucas.
9/2/429/0004	Old State School, Albert (Cnr Havelock) Street, Charlestown	Double pitched, gable ends with wooden barge boards and fascias, seven dormer windows and six plaste [sic?]. The school was completed in 1904, and is presently used as a private residence. Type of site: School Current use: school. The school was completed in 1904 with further additions later in the same year. This single story rectangular building of plastered brick with corrugated iron roof and verandah, is a good and surviving example of a school building of the period.	Charlestown	Newcastle	Register	27°25′00″S 29°53′00″E	Upload Photo
9/2/429/0005	St Dominic's Academy Pavilion, St Dominic's Street, Newcastle	Round sports pavilion; timber posts support roof St Dominic's Academy was founded in 1891 as a convent and was run for 97 years by the Dominican sisters. The pavilion was built in 1916 in the Victorian style. It is one of the few remaining structures of this type in South Africa. Architectural style: Victorian. Type of site: recreational Previous use: other: roller skating rink. Current use: pavilion. Entering Newcastle from Ladysmith take Allen Street turn-off from bypass and turn left into Scott St. Of architectural and local historical interest – The pavilion was built in 1916 in the Victorian sty	Newcastle, Central	Newcastle	Provincial Heritage Site	27°45′41″S 29°55′16″E	Upload Photo
9/2/429/0008	Old Carnegie Library, Voortrekker Street, Newcastle	Public library endowed by American multi-millionaire and philanthropist Andrew Carnegie (1837–1919). The building was erected in 1915 in the Edwardian style and was designed by the architectural firm of Chick and Bartholomew. It was the first Carnegie Library Type of site: Library Previous use: library. Current use: museum & art gallery. Entering Newcastle from Ladysmith take Allen Street turn-off from bypass and turn left into Scott St. The building was erected in 1915 in the Edwardian style and was designed by the architectural firm o	Newcastle, Central	Newcastle	Provincial Heritage Site	27°45′24″S 29°55′57″E	Public library endowed by American multi-millionaire and philanthropist Andrew Carnegie (1837–1919). The building was erected in 1915 in the Edwardian style and was designed by the architectural firm of Chick and Bartholomew. It was the first Carnegie Library Type of site: Library Previous use: library. Current use: museum & art gallery. Entering Newcastle from Ladysmith take Allen Street turn-off from bypass and turn left into Scott St. The building was erected in 1915 in the Edwardian style and was designed by the architectural firm o
9/2/429/0009	Kliphuis Moedergemeente, 64 Voortrekker Street, Newcastle	Previous use: Sunday school. Current use: house. Built by a local builder, Magnus MacIntosh, for a Dr Ormond in 1903, during the 1920s this house se	Newcastle, Central	Newcastle	Register	29°56′10″S 27°45′40″E	Upload Photo
9/2/429/0010	Majuba Battlefield, Farm Majuba North 11267, Newcastle District	Amajuba Mountain is sometimes also referred to as Spitskop or Colley’s Kop. It lies to the west of the main road from Newcastle to Volksrust, barely five kilometres south of Charlestown. It can be climbed by a path from the Majuba railway station across t Type of site: Battlefield Previous use: battlefield. Current use: site museum. Entering Newcastle from Ladysmith take Allen Street turn-off from bypass and turn left into Scott St. Battlesite of significant victory for the Boers against British forces led by Sir George Pomeroy		Newcastle	Provincial Heritage Site	27°28′40″S 29°51′00″E	Upload Photo
9/2/429/0010/002	Majuba Battlefield, Farm Majuba North 11267, Newcastle District: Conservation Area	Type of site: Conservation area Current use: memorial.		Newcastle	Heritage Area	27°28′33″S 29°51′01″E	Upload Photo
9/2/429/0013	Old Residency, 96 Allen Street, Newcastle	Type of site: Residency Previous use: house. Current use: offices.	Newcastle	Newcastle	Register	29°56′31″S 27°45′52″E	Upload Photo
9/2/429/0016	Hilldrop House (Rider Haggard House), Hilldrop Road, Newcastle	Much indigenous wood, e.g. yellowwood, was used in the construction, while most of the beams in the roof are secured by wooden pegs in place of nails or screws. Some alterations have been made by previous owners, e.g. rooms at the eastern end and kitchen, The house was built by Mr (later Sir) Melmoth Osborne when he was resident magistrate of Newcastle and, is a very good example of British settler rural architecture. The farm, Rooi Point, on which the house stood was purchased by Mr (later Sir) Rider Hagga Type of site: House Current use: residence. This imposing building was erected by Sir Melmoth Osborne, resident magistrate of Newcastle from 1868 to 1875. Sir Rider Haggard took occupation in January 1881 and during his sojourn the Royal Commission which drew up the terms of the Pretoria Convention	Newcastle	Newcastle	Provincial Heritage Site	27°47′30″S 29°57′00″E	Upload Photo
9/2/429/0017	Old Magazine, Scott Street, Newcastle	The old Armoury was presumably built in 1860 by military volunteers as an arsenal for the defence of the area around Newcastle. It was used as a mobilisation post during 1914–1918 and again in 1939 and is therefore closely associated with the history of Type of site: Magazine Previous use: arsenal. The old Armoury was presumably built in 1860 by military volunteers as an arsenal for the defence of the area around Newcastle. It was used as a mobilisation post during 1914–1918 and again in 1939 and is therefore closely associated with the history of	Newcastle, Central	Newcastle	Provincial Heritage Site	27°45′51″S 29°55′19″E	The old Armoury was presumably built in 1860 by military volunteers as an arsenal for the defence of the area around Newcastle. It was used as a mobilisation post during 1914–1918 and again in 1939 and is therefore closely associated with the history of Type of site: Magazine Previous use: arsenal. The old Armoury was presumably built in 1860 by military volunteers as an arsenal for the defence of the area around Newcastle. It was used as a mobilisation post during 1914–1918 and again in 1939 and is therefore closely associated with the history of
9/2/429/0018	Buffalo River Bridge, Farms Milton 1007 and Kromellenboog 170, Newcastle District	Type of site: Bridge Current use: bridge. This bridge was erected jointly by the Zuid-Afrikaansche Republiek and the Colony of Natal and was o		Newcastle	Provincial Heritage Site	27°40′40″S 30°02′20″E	Type of site: Bridge Current use: bridge. This bridge was erected jointly by the Zuid-Afrikaansche Republiek and the Colony of Natal and was o
9/2/429/0019	Fort Amiel, Fort Street, Newcastle	This structure was named after Major Ameil and was erected in about 1878. It was used by British soldiers during the Zulu Rebellion and the First War of Independence. Type of site: Fort. Previous use: fortifications. Current use: museum.	Newcastle, Amiel Park	Newcastle	Provincial Heritage Site	27°44′40″S 29°55′10″E	This structure was named after Major Ameil and was erected in about 1878. It was used by British soldiers during the Zulu Rebellion and the First War of Independence. Type of site: Fort. Previous use: fortifications. Current use: museum.
9/2/429/0027	Old Court House, Holland Street, Charlestown	Small wood and corrugated iron building, single pitched roof with plastered chimney, wooden cottage Built as a court house in 1906 for the Colonial Public Works Department. Type of site: Courthouse Current use: court house. Built as a court house in 1906 for the Colonial Public Works Department (1889 date on building inaccurate), plans for this small wood and iron building were drawn up by the Public Works Branch, Natal Colony. The building neatly indicates the size of th	Charlestown	Newcastle	Register	27°24′48″S 29°52′24″E	Upload Photo
9/2/430/0001	Lutheran Church, New Hanover	Type of site: Church Current use: religious. Historical and architectural interest – This cruciform church was erected in 1867 by German settlers	New Hanover	New Hanover	Provincial Heritage Site	29°21′21″S 30°31′24″E	Upload Photo
9/2/434/0001	Isandlwana Battlefield, Reserve 18 15840, Nqutu District	The modern roads from the heart of Zululand still follow the original routes—north-westwards over the Isihiungu Hills at Babanango, past the Isipezi Mountain and across the Buffalo River to Dundee. For many years the Buffalo or Blood River was regarded as Type of site: Battlefield Previous use: battlefield. Current use: site museum & monument. From Babanango head north to Nqutu or from Nqutu south to Babanago. Turn left at the signpost about. In the vicinity of this hill a British force under the immediate command of Lieut.-Col. A. W. Durnford and Brevet-Lieut. Col. B. Pulleine was virtually annihilated on 22 January 1879 by a Zulu impi of between 20 000 and 25 000 men under the command		Nqutu	Provincial Heritage Site	28°21′20″S 30°39′10″E	The modern roads from the heart of Zululand still follow the original routes—north-westwards over the Isihiungu Hills at Babanango, past the Isipezi Mountain and across the Buffalo River to Dundee. For many years the Buffalo or Blood River was regarded as Type of site: Battlefield Previous use: battlefield. Current use: site museum & monument. From Babanango head north to Nqutu or from Nqutu south to Babanago. Turn left at the signpost about. In the vicinity of this hill a British force under the immediate command of Lieut.-Col. A. W. Durnford and Brevet-Lieut. Col. B. Pulleine was virtually annihilated on 22 January 1879 by a Zulu impi of between 20 000 and 25 000 men under the command
9/2/434/0005	Prince Imperial Memorial, Reserve No.18 7638, Nqutu District	Another place that brings the bitter course of the Zulu War of 1879 to mind lies to the west of the road from Babanango to Vryheid via Barklieside—the place where Eugene Louis Joseph Napoleon Bonaparte, Prince Imperial of France, was killed by Zulus on 1s Type of site: Memorial Current use: memorial. Prince Imperial, son of Napoleon III of France joined the British forces in Zululand during the Zulu		Nqutu	Provincial Heritage Site	28°08′00″S 30°47′50″E	Upload Photo
9/2/435/0001	Kruger Bridge, Farms Uitval 195 and Eersteling 690, Paulpietersburg District	Fine stone bridge of dressed stone, three arches, metal balustrades. The road to Vryheid crosses the Pivaan River about 19 kilometres from Paulpietersburg. The bridge is another of the stone arched bridges built in the time of the Zuid Afrikaansche Republiek. On 9 December 1895, the Executive Committee resolved to build Type of site: Bridge Current use: bridge. Vryheid – Paulpietersburg route via Natal Hot Springs (not R33). From Vryheid left at turn-off. This fine stone bridge was completed in 1898 on the instructions of the Government of the South African Republic.		Paulpietersburg	Provincial Heritage Site	27°30′10″S 30°49′00″E	Fine stone bridge of dressed stone, three arches, metal balustrades. The road to Vryheid crosses the Pivaan River about 19 kilometres from Paulpietersburg. The bridge is another of the stone arched bridges built in the time of the Zuid Afrikaansche Republiek. On 9 December 1895, the Executive Committee resolved to build Type of site: Bridge Current use: bridge. Vryheid – Paulpietersburg route via Natal Hot Springs (not R33). From Vryheid left at turn-off. This fine stone bridge was completed in 1898 on the instructions of the Government of the South African Republic. Media related to Kruger Bridge (Bivane River) at Wikimedia Commons
9/2/435/0002	Library, 27 Smit Street, Paulpietersburg	This impressive church building, the cornerstone of which was laid on 20 May 1899 by Ds Ph.S. Snyman and which was used as a storehouse by British soldiers during the Anglo-Boer War (1899—1902), was only taken into use on 20 May 1904. According to tradition Type of site: Library Previous use: church. Current use: library. Entering town from Vryheid (R33 or R34) travel down High Street and turn left into Smit Street. Libr. This impressive building was first used as a storehouse by British soldiers during the Anglo-Boer War	Paulpietersburg	Paulpietersburg	Provincial Heritage Site	27°25′28″S 30°48′56″E	Upload Photo
9/2/435/0003	Old Residency, Paulpietersburg	The town Paulpietersburg established in 1888, originally fell under the Zuid Afrikaansche Republiek and was at first named Paulpietersrrust after President Paul Kruger and General Piet Joubert. This name was later changed to Paulpietersdorp and finally in Type of site: Residency Current use: residence. This Drostdy, erected in 1906, was the first British public building to be built in the vicinity. It...?	Paulpietersburg	Paulpietersburg	Provincial Heritage Site	27°25′48″S 30°49′17″E	The town Paulpietersburg established in 1888, originally fell under the Zuid Afrikaansche Republiek and was at first named Paulpietersrrust after President Paul Kruger and General Piet Joubert. This name was later changed to Paulpietersdorp and finally in Type of site: Residency Current use: residence. This Drostdy, erected in 1906, was the first British public building to be built in the vicinity. It...?
9/2/437/0005	Umbilo Waterworks, Paradise Valley Nature Reserve, Pinetown	Type of site: Waterworks Previous use: other: waterworks. Current use: abandoned. This site is one of the earliest large-scale gravity-fed water supply schemes in South Africa.	Pinetown, Paradise Valley	Pinetown	Provincial Heritage Site	29°50′08″S 30°53′00″E	Upload Photo
9/2/437/0011	Indigo Vats, Paradise Valley, Pinetown	These vats were constructed by two Dutch immigrants, Colenbrander and Van Prehn, and were used between 1854 and 1856 for the manufacture of indigo dye. Type of site: industrial Previous use: other: dye vats. Current use: vacant (ruins). From Entabeni Road enter the Natal Institute of Immunology grounds. The vats are a short walk through. These vats were constructed by two Dutch immigrants, Colenbrander and Van Prehn, and were used between 1854 and 1856 for the manufacture of indigo dye.	Pinetown, Paradise Valley	Pinetown	Provincial Heritage Site	29°50′12″S 30°52′54″E	Upload Photo
9/2/437/0012	Christianenberg Berlin Mission Church, Krause Street, Clermont: Historic Bell Tower, ChristianenburgBerlin Mission Station, Clermont, Pinetowm District	The historic bell tower, church bell and cross are intimately connected with the history of the Berlin Mission in South Africa. Type of site: Bell Tower Current use: religious. From R613 Marwick highway (old motorway) take M7 St Johns Rd at Pinetown. Go north taking 6th left S. The historic bell tower, church bell and cross are intimately connected with the history of the Berlin Mission in South Africa.	Clermont	Pinetown	Provincial Heritage Site	29°47′50″S 30°53′46″E	Upload Photo
9/2/437/0012/001	Christianenberg Berlin Mission Church, Krause Street, Clermont: Cast-iron Commemorative Cross	Type of site: Church.	Clermont	Pinetown	Heritage Object	29°47′55″S 30°53′45″E	Upload Photo
9/2/437/0012/002	Christianenberg Berlin Mission Church, Krause Street, Clermont: 1846 Church Bell	Type of site: Church.	Clermont	Pinetown	Heritage Object	29°47′55″S 30°53′45″E	Upload Photo
9/2/437/0015	Old New Germany Lutheran Church, Shepstone (Cnr Blair Atholl) Road, New Germany	The German Lutheran Church at New Germany was erected in 1862 and is the oldest existing German church in Natal. The furniture and fittings in the church are of exceptional cultural-historic importance. Type of site: Church Current use: religious. On Old Main Road (M31) Pinetown head towards Durban. Turn left onto Stapleton/Otto Volek Rd. After a. Historical and architectural interest – The German Lutheran Church at New Germany erected in 1862	New Germany	Pinetown	Provincial Heritage Site	29°48′15″S 30°52′21″E	Upload Photo
9/2/439/0001	Paddock Station, Paddock, Port Shepstone District	This late Edwardian railway station is situated on the Port Shepstone to Harding narrow gauge line (technically a train Line) which was constructed during 1917. The platform is raised only slightly at the railway tracks as was the custom at the time. Type of site: Railway Station Current use: station.		Port Shepstone	Provincial Heritage Site	30°45′55″S 30°14′40″E	This late Edwardian railway station is situated on the Port Shepstone to Harding narrow gauge line (technically a train Line) which was constructed during 1917. The platform is raised only slightly at the railway tracks as was the custom at the time. Type of site: Railway Station Current use: station.
9/2/439/0008	Old Police Fort, Port Shepstone	Type of site: Fort, Police Station Current use: police station. Historical and architectural interest – unusual design with fortifications on flat-topped roofs of b	Port Shepstone	Port Shepstone	Provincial Heritage Site	30°44′04″S 30°26′57″E	Upload Photo
9/2/439/0009	Kneisel's Castle, 24 Reynolds Street, Port Shepstone	Kneisel’s Castle is an impressive residence built in a classical style with a square tower at one corner of the facade and a steep roofed heavily detailed gable with central diamond cartouche ventilator, on the other side. The centre section of the buildi This dwelling house, which was erected by Charles Frederick Kneisel, a German settler from Mainz, shortly after his arrival in Natal in 1882, shows distinct German Colonial characteristics. Kneisel first settled at a place known as Ebenezer, on a Mission Type of site: House Previous use: house. Current use: vacant. Kneisel’s Castle which can be regarded as a period piece, is one of the oldest residences in Port Shepstone.	Port Shepstone	Port Shepstone	Provincial Heritage Site	30°44′27″S 30°27′07″E	Upload Photo
9/2/439/0012	Port Shepstone Lighthouse, Port Shepstone	Present lighthouse replaced the first light marking entrance to harbour, erected in 1895. The light Type of site: Lighthouse Current use: lighthouse. This unusual cast-iron structure, erected on its present site in 1906, is one of the two oldest funt	Port Shepstone	Port Shepstone	Provincial Heritage Site	30°44′30″S 30°27′33″E	Present lighthouse replaced the first light marking entrance to harbour, erected in 1895. The light Type of site: Lighthouse Current use: lighthouse. This unusual cast-iron structure, erected on its present site in 1906, is one of the two oldest funt
9/2/439/0015	Izotsha River Bridge, Port Shepstone District	Type of site: Bridge. Built in 1907 as part of the Alfred County Railway, the bridge was later converted for narrow-gauge. It is the last iron screww pile railway bridge in KwaZulu-Natal. There are seven piers each with two 15" cast-iron screw piles, supporting eight 30 plat		Port Shepstone	Register	30°46′47″S 30°24′48″E	Upload Photo
9/2/439/0016	Royston Hall, 10 Royston Lane, Umtentweni	Double-storey. T-shaped, front verandah, upper balcony entered from two bedrooms, hipped roof of asb Named Royston Hall 1919 by 'Galloping Jack' Brigadier-General John Robinson Royston. Type of site: House Previous use: house. Current use: office & house. This local landmark is the oldest residence in the area. It was occupied from 1906 to 1942 by "Galloping Jack" Brigadier-General John Robinson Royston, CMG, DSO, a prominent figure in his time.	Umtentweni	Port Shepstone	Register	30°43′00″S 30°28′00″E	Upload Photo
9/2/440/0001	Blarney, Farm Dunbar Estate 1478, Richmond District	The Blarney Cottage, a wattle-and daub hut and a wooden barn. Simple dwelling with front verandah. This cottage was built by Fred McCleod, who was one of the children of George and Ellen McCleod. They were from the original Byrne Settlers, one of the most important English immigrant schemes that took place in Natal in the middle of the nineteenth cent Architectural style: vernacular cottage. Type of site: House Previous use: house. Current use: museum. Travel for 5 km (3 mi) from Richmond on the Byrne Valley Road. Turn right at the Blarnery cottage monument road sign and travel another 500m. Turn left onto the gravel road and travel another 100m to the sign board indicating the subject property. One of the earliest British settler homes in Byrne, Natal, it was built by Fred McLeod.	Richmond	Richmond	Provincial Heritage Site	29°50′50″S 30°12′40″E	Upload Photo
9/2/440/0007	Carnarvon Masonic Lodge, 57 Russel Street, Richmond	Gabled roof of medium pitch to temple; projecting entrance hall central to a composition of high-lev The Carnarvon Lodge of Freemasons came into existence on 31 Oct 1876. This rectangular brick building with its Victorian embellishments was erected in 1883 to accommodate the local Freemasons' Lodge. This Lodge was established in 1876 and named after the Architectural style: Victorian lodge. Type of site: Masonic Lodge Current use: other: Masonic lodge. Oldest county lodge in Natal (Coulson, C. Beaulieu-on-Illovo Richmond Natal. Its people and history	Richmond, Central	Richmond	Provincial Heritage Site	29°52′29″S 30°16′39″E	Upload Photo
9/2/440/0010	Richmond and Byrne District Museum, 46 Victoria (Cnr Chiley) Street, Richmond	L-shaped villa of medium pitched roof flared over veranda and projecting side gable of steeper pitch Acquired by local authority 1982 for institution of museum. Former Presbyterian manse. Architectural style: Victorian villa. Type of site: House Previous use: house. Current use: museum. Entering Richmond on Shepstone Street proceed into the centre of the town and turn left into Chilley. This building is the best preserved and most impressive surviving example of a vernacular form of ar	Richmond	Richmond	Provincial Heritage Site	29°52′32″S 30°16′41″E	Upload Photo
9/2/440/0011	Baynes House, Farm Nel's Rust 849, Richmond District	Single storey with basement, T-shaped plan. Walls are of Pietermaritzburg red-brick. Hipped corrugate Built for Joseph Baynes and his second wife, Sarah Baynes. He used it as his country house and office Type of site: House Current use: house residence. From Pietermaritzburg-Richmond road take second turn to Baynesfield on right. At T in centre of vill. Architectural and Historical interest – This house is one of the great rural manor houses of Natal.	Richmond	Richmond	Provincial Heritage Site	29°45′50″S 30°20′30″E	Upload Photo
9/2/440/0012	First Cattle Dip, Farm Meyershoek 847, Richmond District	Built of bricks and mortar; roof of curved corrugated iron sheets supported by gum poles; tank has a Built for J. Baynes, this cattle dip was the first ever erected in South Africa. Baynes was advised b Type of site: Cattle Dip Previous use: other: dip. Current use: abandoned. From Pietermaritzburg-Richmond road take second turn to Baynesfield on right. At T in centre of vill. This site is one of great significance in the development of stock farming in Southern Africa, being		Richmond	Provincial Heritage Site	29°45′20″S 30°16′10″E	Upload Photo
9/2/440/0013	Old Nel's Rust Dairy, Farm Nel's Rust 849, Richmond District	Double storey building of square form; Broseley tiled hipped roof; shale walls with brick quoining; Built for Joseph Baynes as a 'model dairy', it pioneered commercial butter making in Natal. Prior to Type of site: Dairy Previous use: dairy. Current use: museum. From Pietermaritzburg-Richmond road take second turn to Baynesfield on right. At T in centre of vill. The Old Nel's Rust Dairy is one of the best designed and hence most architecturally significant agri		Richmond	Provincial Heritage Site	29°45′50″S 30°20′30″E	Double storey building of square form; Broseley tiled hipped roof; shale walls with brick quoining; Built for Joseph Baynes as a 'model dairy', it pioneered commercial butter making in Natal. Prior to Type of site: Dairy Previous use: dairy. Current use: museum. From Pietermaritzburg-Richmond road take second turn to Baynesfield on right. At T in centre of vill. The Old Nel's Rust Dairy is one of the best designed and hence most architecturally significant agri
9/2/440/0014	Joseph Baynes Mausoleum, Farm Nel's Rust 849, Richmond District	Type of site: Vault, Memorial Current use: vault. This aesthetically significant site is the burial place of Joseph Baynes, a turn of the century phil		Richmond	Provincial Heritage Site	29°45′55″S 30°20′29″E	Upload Photo
9/2/440/0015	Lynmouth Glacial Pavement, Farm Hopewell 881, Richmond District	Current use: geological feature. From Pmb-Richmond road take D360 on left just after 2nd Baynesfield turnoff. 5.9 km (4 mi) see gate to Lynmo. This unspoiled site is one of geological significance, exhibiting fine evidence of the glacial activity		Richmond	Provincial Heritage Site	29°45′54″S 30°20′25″E	Upload Photo
9/2/441/0002	Sycamore Fig Riverine Forest, Farm Kleinspan 14182, Ubombo District	Current use: other: forest.		Ubombo	Heritage Area	27°55′24″S 32°19′34″E	Upload Photo
9/2/444/0003	Town Hall, 37-47 Bell (Cnr Pine) Street, Greytown	Tower and block alongside building 1894; completed with hall & (porte-cochere) 1903–04 This building with its high tower, the cornerstone of which was laid on 22 June 1897, was only completed in 1903. Architectural style: Free Renaissance. Type of site: Town Hall Current use: town hall. Entering Greytown from Pmb. turn right to Dundee, ie: into Durban Road. Take sixth left into Bell St. architecture design of quality	Greytown	Umvoti	Provincial Heritage Site	30°35′34″S 29°03′34″E	Upload Photo
9/2/444/0006	General Louis Botha's Birthplace, Greytown, Umvoti District	The property consist of a portion of land on which a memorial cairn is erected. The site of a simple house which has completely disappeared. In that house Gen. Louis Botha, Commandant-General of the Zuid-Afrilcaansche Republiek from 1900 to 1902, Prime Minister of the Transvaal from 1906 to 1910 and the first Prime Minister of the Un Type of site: House Previous use: house?. From Greytown take the R33 to Pietermaritzburg. About 3.5 km (2 mi) from the centre of Greytwon turn left on. Birthplace of General Louis Botha, an historically important South African leader and politician.	Greytown	Umvoti	Provincial Heritage Site	29°05′20″S 30°36′20″E	The property consist of a portion of land on which a memorial cairn is erected. The site of a simple house which has completely disappeared. In that house Gen. Louis Botha, Commandant-General of the Zuid-Afrilcaansche Republiek from 1900 to 1902, Prime Minister of the Transvaal from 1906 to 1910 and the first Prime Minister of the Un Type of site: House Previous use: house?. From Greytown take the R33 to Pietermaritzburg. About 3.5 km (2 mi) from the centre of Greytwon turn left on. Birthplace of General Louis Botha, an historically important South African leader and politician.
9/2/444/0007	Balmoral Farmhouse and Stables, near Rietvlei, Umvoti District	farmhouse with thick shale walls; 'leg 'o mutton' gable with entrance to loft. Built in 1865 by Petrus Albertus Lyno Otto who trekked from Caledon, Cape in 1839. He was a land bar Type of site: Farm. Stables Current use: house. This farmhouse is typical of its period in Natal and possesses some outstanding features. Founder of		Umvoti	Provincial Heritage Site	29°09′00″S 30°45′00″E	Upload Photo
9/2/444/0008	Greytown Museum, 68 Scott (Cnr Durban) Street, Greytown	Double gable and cross gabled roof with bellcast veranda profile on 3 sides. Timber posts and bracke Built for Dr Daniel Birtwell, District Surgeon for Greytown; served as magistrate's residency 1889-1 The historic building of the Greytown Museum was used as a dwelling-house from 1889 by J. E. Fannin, a prominent local figure of the time, and is a good e Architectural style: Victorian villa. Type of site: House Previous use: house. Current use: museum. Entering Greytown from Pmb. on R622 turn right to Dundee onto Durban Road and third left into Scott. Historical and architectural interest – The historic building of the Greytown Museum was used as a d	Greytown	Umvoti	Provincial Heritage Site	30°35′07″S 29°03′48″E	Upload Photo
9/2/444/0009	Hermannsburg Lutheran Church, Hermannsburg	Architecturally, the Church is a Gothic Revival church based on the parish church form so common in Northern Europe. The plan is a Latin Cross with the long axis aligned East-West: and the transept incorporating a side entrance and vestry aligned North-So The foundation stone of this church was laid on 1 April 1868. The building, designed in the Gothic Revival style, was consecrated on 23 February 1870. This church is closely associated with the history and founding of the Hermannsburg Mission Society and Type of site: Church Current use: religious. From Pietermaritzburg take R33 to Greytown. Turn right to Ahrens shortly after Seven oaks and crossig. This church is closely associated with the history and founding of the Hermannsburg Mission Society	Hermannsburg	Umvoti	Provincial Heritage Site	29°02′30″S 30°47′30″E	Upload Photo
9/2/444/0010	Hermannsburg Mission Houses, Hermannsburg School, Hermansburg	The historic mission house at Hermannsburg was erected around 1862 in the German-Saxon style, in order to provide housing for the staff of the Hermannsburg Mission Station. This building is probably the only German-Saxon house in South Africa. Type of site: School Previous use: houses. Current use: museum?. From Pietermaritzburg take R33 to Greytown. Right to Ahrens shortly after Seven oaks and crossing of. The historic mission house at Hermannsburg was erected around 1862 in the GermanSaxon style, in orde	Hermannsburg	Umvoti	Provincial Heritage Site	29°02′20″S 30°48′00″E	Upload Photo
9/2/444/0011	Ruins of Fort Ahrens, Farm Perseverance 1324, Hermannsburg	Constructed of stone and loopholed; also consisted of a wall, about 2m high, enclosing a rectangle. These ruins are the remains of Fort Ahrens or Fort Perseverance, better known locally as Esikanisweni Lager. Fort Ahrens was erected in the sixties or seventies of the nineteenth century, not for military purposes, but as a refuge for the civilian population. Type of site: Fort Previous use: fortifications. Current use: abandoned. Was erected in the 1860s or 1870s as a refuge for the civilian population.		Umvoti	Provincial Heritage Site	29°01′11″S 30°46′49″E	Upload Photo
9/2/445/0006	Green Point Lighthouse, Farm Clansthal 1202, Umzinto District	second last lighthouse to use petroleum vapour burners, first to be fully automated on 18 November 1 Type of site: Lighthouse Current use: lighthouse. This unusual cast-iron structure, erected in 1905, is the oldest lighthouse on the KwaZulu-Natal coa		Umzinto	Provincial Heritage Site	30°14′56″S 30°46′38″E	Upload Photo
9/2/446/0001	Himeville Fort, Arbuckle (Cnr George) Street, Himeville	Possibly the last built in Natal, this is a significant example of a colonial fortification. This Prison, built as a laager at the time of the Siege of Ladysmith in 1899, is a high-walled rectangular structure with a large enclosed courtyard. The prison building with its loopholes is presumably the last of its kind built by the Natal Colonial Government Type of site: Gaol Previous use: fortifications. Current use: museum & Magistrate's Court. This building complex was erected as a refuge during the Siege of Ladysmith in 1899. The prison building with its loopholes is presumably the last of its kind built by the Natal Colonial Government.	Himeville	Underberg	Provincial Heritage Site	29°44′59″S 29°30′45″E	Upload Photo
9/2/446/0001/001	Himeville Fort, 34 Arbuckle (Cnr George) Street, Himeville: Undeclared section	Current use: Magistrate's Court.	Himeville	Underberg	Register	29°45′00″S 29°30′44″E	Upload Photo
9/2/446/0002	Old Residency, Arbuckle (Cnr Clayton) Street, Himeville	It is a single-storied, stone building under a corrugated iron roof. It has sliding sash windows and of its fireplaces, two are cast iron and one has a painted decorated tile surround. The timber brackets to the verandah posts match with those of Himevili It was built at the same time as the Himeville Fort, in 1898. The Residency has been in constant use as the Magistrate’s Residence since it was constructed. Type of site: Residency Current use: house. The building complements the Himevilie Fort in function, style and detail. It has been in constant use as the Magistrate’s Residence and as such has played a leading role in the social life of the district. An outstanding example of a residence of a prom	Himeville	Underberg	Provincial Heritage Site	29°44′49″S 29°30′50″E	Upload Photo
9/2/446/0006-004	Underberg District War Memorial, 36 Arbuckle Street, Himeville	A large, approximately 3.5-meter-high artillery shell–shaped stone structure with three black granite plaques at Commemorates war dead of the district from both world wars and the Namibian border campaign. Type of site: Memorial Current use: memorial. An unusual-shaped memorial to the war dead of the district, this structure is a landmark in the cent	Himeville	Underberg	Register	29°44′54″S 29°30′47″E	Upload Photo
9/2/446/0006-006	47 Arbuckle Street, Himeville, Underberg District	Single storey, square, sandstone building with hipped corrugated iron roof and no gutters. Sas Type of site: House Current use: house. Unusual stone house	Himeville	Underberg	Register	29°44′53″S 29°30′44″E	Upload Photo
9/2/446/0006-007	The Rectory, 29 Arbuckle Street, Himeville	Single storey square verandah house with hipped, corrugated-iron roof, masonry walls, semi-glazed d Appears to have been used as the rectory from at least the time of construction of the church in 195 Type of site: Parsonage Current use: house. A very good late example of a typical Natal verandah house.	Himeville	Underberg	Register	29°45′03″S 29°30′40″E	Upload Photo
9/2/446/0006-008	The House, 49 Arbuckle Street, Himeville	Twin-gabled, square house under IBR roof. Stuccoed walls, variety of windows and doors. Plain triang Type of site: House Current use: house. A fine, though much altered, example of its type	Himeville	Underberg	Register	29°44′37″S 29°30′51″E	Upload Photo
9/2/446/0006-009	Nelton, 53 Arbuckle Street, Himeville	Single storey, square house under corrugated iron roof. Stuccoed walls with two Cape Dutch-style gab Type of site: House Current use: house. A fine example of a house from the Union period	Himeville	Underberg	Register	29°44′35″S 29°30′55″E	Upload Photo
9/2/446/0006-010	Church of Saint Michael and All Angels, 31 Arbuckle Street, Himeville	Single-storey Norman style church with rectangular nave, semi-circular choir and low, castellated to Foundation stone unveiled by EF Pennington, Vicar of Ixopo Parish, Sat 20 May 1950. Built as a war m Architectural style: Norman Gothic Revival. Type of site: Church Current use: church. A landmark in the village, this building is an unusually late example of its style	Himeville	Underberg	Register	29°45′02″S 29°30′40″E	Upload Photo
9/2/446/0006-011	11 Arbuckle Street, Himeville, Underberg District	Single storey square verandah house with hipped, corrugated-iron roof, brick and stucco walls, 4-pan Type of site: House Current use: house. One of only two surviving Natal verandah houses in the village. It is the older of the two.	Himeville	Underberg	Register	29°45′16″S 29°30′35″E	Upload Photo
9/2/447/0001	Blood River Battlefield, Farm Vechtkop 168, Utrecht District	At a point 19 kilometres from Dundee on the road to Vryheid, a secondary road turns off sharply to the right and leads one over the hills for 18 kilometres to the Battlefield of Blood River. Here the Blood River skirts the foot of Vegkop on its eastern si Type of site: Battlefield Previous use: other: battlefield. Current use: museum/monument. A portion of the well-known historical battlefield of Blood River where a group of Voortrekkers unde		Utrecht	Provincial Heritage Site	27°39′36″S 30°19′48″E	At a point 19 kilometres from Dundee on the road to Vryheid, a secondary road turns off sharply to the right and leads one over the hills for 18 kilometres to the Battlefield of Blood River. Here the Blood River skirts the foot of Vegkop on its eastern si Type of site: Battlefield Previous use: other: battlefield. Current use: museum/monument. A portion of the well-known historical battlefield of Blood River where a group of Voortrekkers unde Media related to Blood River Memorial at Wikimedia Commons
9/2/447/0003	Old Dutch Reformed Church Parsonage, Church (Cnr Loop) Street, Utrecht	Type of site: Pastorie Previous use: house. Current use: museum. From Vryheid take the first turn-off into Utrecht and travel down van Rooyen Street. Turn left into V.	Utrecht	Utrecht	Provincial Heritage Site	27°39′59″S 30°19′05″E	Upload Photo
9/2/447/0005	Shawe House, 67 Church Street, Utrecht	single-storey dwelling house in colonial Natal verandah house style George Shaw became the first Postmaster of Utrecht 1893–1897, when he resigned to go into the proper Architectural style: late-Victorian. Type of site: House Current use: house. From Vryheid take the first turn-off into Utrecht and travel down vanRooyen Street. Turn right into. Historical and architectural interest – The house is connected with a personality who played a leadi	Utrecht	Utrecht	Provincial Heritage Site	30°19′25″S 27°39′14″E	Upload Photo
9/2/447/0009	Dirk Uys House, 61 Church Street, Utrecht	single storey dwelling house in colonial Natal verandah house style The house seems to have been built in the 1860s, and was definitely in existence in 1879. The Uys fa Type of site: House Current use: house. From Vryheid take the first turn-off into Utrecht and travel down vanRooyen Street. Turn right into. Historical and architectural interest – the original portion of this house is one of the earliest bu	Utrecht	Utrecht	Provincial Heritage Site	30°19′20″S 27°39′16″E	Upload Photo
9/2/447/0013	Dutch Reformed Church, 50 Church (Bloem) Street, Utrecht	The foundation stone of this church was laid by the Commandant General of the Transvaal, Gen. P J Joubert, on 23 October 1891. The inauguration of the building followed on 21 April 1893. Type of site: Church Current use: religious. From Vryheid take the first turn-off into Utrecht and travel down vanRooyen Street. Turn left into C. The foundation stone of this church was laid by the commandant General of the Transvaal, Gen. P.J. J	Utrecht	Utrecht	Provincial Heritage Site	30°19′09″S 27°39′18″E	Upload Photo
9/2/447/0015	Old Powder Magazine, President Street, Utrecht	rectangular brick structure with hipped, corrugated iron roof The powder magazine was erected in 1893 and is one of 3 similar structures built by the ZAR. The oth Type of site: Powder Magazine Previous use: powder magazine. Current use: abandoned. From Van Rooyen Street trun into President Street head east towards paulpietersburg. Turn into the P. One of three similar structures erected by the ZAR in 1893.	Utrecht	Utrecht	Provincial Heritage Site	27°39′32″S 30°19′44″E	Upload Photo
9/2/447/0016	Pieter Lafras Uys Monument and Grave, Church Street, Utrecht	One of the few memorials proclaimed as historical monuments by the Historical Monuments Commission stands in Utrecht the simple but dignified and elegant monument erected in honour of Pieter Lafras Uys. Pieter Lafras Uys bore the same names as his father, Type of site: Grave Memorial Current use: grave. From Vryheid take the first turn-off into Utrecht and travel down vanRooyen Street. Turn left into C. Grave and monument to Pieter Lafras Uys, Voortrekker leader killed during the Anglo-Boer War, in the	Utrecht	Utrecht	Provincial Heritage Site	27°39′59″S 30°19′05″E	Upload Photo
9/2/447/0017	Magistrate's Court, 57 Voor Street, Utrecht	The magistrate's office building was erected between 1894 and 1899 by the Government of the "Zuid-Afrikaansche Republiek". Type of site: Courthouse Current use: court house. From Vryheid take the first turn-off into Utrecht and travel down vanRooyen Street. Turn left into V. The magistrate's office building was erected between 1894 and 1899 by the government of the 'Zuid-Afrikaansche Republiek".	Utrecht	Utrecht	Provincial Heritage Site	30°19′18″S 27°39′20″E	Upload Photo
9/2/447/0018	Town Hall, 55 Voor Street, Utrecht	The building itself is of brown stone and is T-shaped. The front facade has two oval windows on either side of the main entrance doorway, while, the door itself is covered by an elaborate portico, which is supported by Grecian columns. The roof of this po As early as 1854 a town had been planned for the Balesberg region. The site was chosen on the farm Schoonstroom, its name being presumably the first name of the town. On 8 March 1856 the town was renamed Utrecht after its counterpart in the Netherlands. I Type of site: Town Hall Current use: town hall. From Vryheid take the first turn-off into Utrecht and travel down vanRooyen Street. Turn left into V. The Utrecht Town Hall dates from 1913 and is a brown stone building of considerable character and forms an essential part of Utrecht.	Utrecht	Utrecht	Provincial Heritage Site	30°19′16″S 27°39′21″E	The building itself is of brown stone and is T-shaped. The front facade has two oval windows on either side of the main entrance doorway, while, the door itself is covered by an elaborate portico, which is supported by Grecian columns. The roof of this po As early as 1854 a town had been planned for the Balesberg region. The site was chosen on the farm Schoonstroom, its name being presumably the first name of the town. On 8 March 1856 the town was renamed Utrecht after its counterpart in the Netherlands. I Type of site: Town Hall Current use: town hall. From Vryheid take the first turn-off into Utrecht and travel down vanRooyen Street. Turn left into V. The Utrecht Town Hall dates from 1913 and is a brown stone building of considerable character and forms an essential part of Utrecht.
9/2/447/0019	Rothman House, 65 Church (Cnr van Rooyen) Street, Utrecht	single storey dwelling house in colonial Natal verandah house style Built in 1909 by JL Rothman, one of the leading citizens of Utrecht, it was the centre of a very act Type of site: House Current use: house. From Vryheid take the first turn-off into Utrecht and travel down vanRooyen Street. Turn right into. The building is regarded as one of the best examples of its type in Northern Natal; it played an imp	Utrecht	Utrecht	Provincial Heritage Site	30°19′24″S 27°39′15″E	Upload Photo
9/2/447/0021	Old Residency, 60 Church (Cnr Van Rooyen) Street, Utrecht	Type of site: Residency Previous use: house. Erf 186, together with the house thereon, forms an essential part of the historic complex of Utrecht	Utrecht	Utrecht	Provincial Heritage Site	30°19′18″S 27°39′16″E	Upload Photo
9/2/448/0001	North and South Gun Points Lancaster Hill Battlefield, Farm Vryheid, Vryheid District	Stone fortification with gun points and loopholes still intact; Bastion point is cleaned and intact; Erected by British forces. At about midnight on 11 Dec.1900 Comdt. Botha launched an attack on the H Type of site: Battery Current use: monument/ battlefield. The two fortresses referred to here are in a very good condition and form part of a panoramic attrac		Vryheid	Provincial Heritage Site	27°46′01″S 30°48′00″E	Upload Photo
9/2/448/0002	Dutch Reformed Church, 131 High (Cnr President and Church) Street, Vryheid	The foundation stone was laid on 25 September 1851 by gen. Lucas Meyer. The church building was inau Type of site: Church Current use: religious. This church was built at a cost of R26 000 and was consecrated on 12 October 1894. The building was	Vryheid, Central	Vryheid	Provincial Heritage Site	27°46′01″S 30°48′00″E	The foundation stone was laid on 25 September 1851 by gen. Lucas Meyer. The church building was inau Type of site: Church Current use: religious. This church was built at a cost of R26 000 and was consecrated on 12 October 1894. The building was
9/2/448/0003	Boshof House, 219 East Street, Vryheid	It is L-shaped with a verandah along two facades of the rectangular down strokes of the L, while the foot of the L is occupied by a sitting room of approximately 50 feet long end a study. The main entrance to the dwelling is furnished with a typical Edwar The land on which this dwelling house is situated was originally granted to Petrus Erasmus on 16 July 1895. The house in the Edwardian style was built in 1905 by a Vryheid merchant as a dwelling house. Type of site: House Current use: house. This elegant dwelling-house, based on the Edwardian style, was erected in 1905 and is situated on a	Vryheid, Central	Vryheid	Provincial Heritage Site	27°45′28″S 30°47′40″E	Upload Photo
9/2/448/0004	Vryheid High School Hall, Church Street, Vryheid	Building of dressed sandstone; has a corrugated iron roof; gable verandah; timber posts supporting v Was opened by the Director of Education, Mr C Mudie, on 5 February 1906. The stonemason was Mr C Gre Type of site: School Current use: school. First school building erected by the Natal Government in the annexed territories; the beginning of f	Vryheid, Central	Vryheid	Provincial Heritage Site	27°46′12″S 30°46′59″E	Upload Photo
9/2/448/0006	Old Carnegie Library, Landrost (Cnr Mark) Street, Vryheid	This imposing Edwardian building was erected in 1908 with funds granted by the Carnegie Trust. The land on which the building stands was a gift from the Vryheid Town Council. Type of site: Library Current use: library. This imposing Edwardian building was erected in 1908 with funds granted by the Carnegie Trust. The l	Vryheid, Central	Vryheid	Provincial Heritage Site	27°46′07″S 30°47′47″E	Upload Photo
9/2/448/0008	95 President Street, Vryheid, Vryheid District	Rectangular house constructed of local stone; two bay windows in front facade; centrally placed mode This house was the scene of secret meetings held by the Volksraad, one of whose number build there. Type of site: House Current use: residence. Historical and Architectural interest – A pleasant early house dating from the time of the New Repub	Vryheid, Central	Vryheid	Provincial Heritage Site	27°46′18″S 30°47′32″E	Upload Photo
9/2/448/0010	Magistrate's Offices and Jail, Church Street, Vryheid	Type of site: Magistrates Office Current use: magistrate's offices & prison. The magistrate's offices building forms an important link in the architectural streetscape of Church	Vryheid, Central	Vryheid	Provincial Heritage Site	27°45′57″S 30°47′58″E	Upload Photo
9/2/448/0011	Kambula Battlefield, Farm Kambula 381, Vryheid District	During the Battle of Kambula a British force of approximately 2 000 men under the command of Colonel Evelyn Wood (later Field Marshal Sir Evelyn Wood, V.C., C.B.) successfully defended themselves against a Zulu impi of 20 000 men under Mnyamana Buthelezi. Type of site: Battlefield Previous use: battlefield. From Vryheid take the R33 to the north. About 12,5km from Vryheid turn left onto gravel. The memoria. During the Battle of Kambula a British force of approximately 2 000 men under the command of Colonel Evelyn Wood (later Field Marshal Sir Evelyn Wood, V.C., C.B.) successfully defended themselves against a Zulu impi of 20 000 men under Mnyamana Buthelezi.		Vryheid	Provincial Heritage Site	27°41′30″S 30°40′30″E	Upload Photo
9/2/448/0017	58 President Street, Vryheid	Has rock Tudor facade in stockbroker Tudor style. Has plaster detailing which painted to resemble ha This imposing dwelling-house that was erected in 1920 is an excellent example of the Tudor-revival style. Type of site: House Current use: residence. Historical and Architectural- This imposing dwelling-house that was erected in 1920 is an excellent	Vryheid, Central	Vryheid	Provincial Heritage Site	30°47′39″S 27°46′29″E	Upload Photo
9/2/448/0018	Old New Republic Raadsaal and Fort, and the Area between this site and Carnegie Library, Vryheid	In President Street there is a simple rectangular little building with a corrugated iron roof, and behind it a sturdy stone building. These are respectively the old Raadsaal or Council Building and the fort of the Nieuwe Republiek'. At the conclusion of the Zulu War of 1879 the Zulu King, Cetshwayo, was deposed, but he was reinstated by Queen Victoria in 1883. However, one of his headmen, Sibebu, drove him out, and he died in February, 1884. His son, Dinizulu, continued the struggle Type of site: Governance Previous use: other: Council chambers. Current use: museum. Historical and architectural interest – The old New Republic Raadsaal and Fort are intimately associ	Vryheid, Central	Vryheid	Provincial Heritage Site	27°46′05″S 30°47′46″E	In President Street there is a simple rectangular little building with a corrugated iron roof, and behind it a sturdy stone building. These are respectively the old Raadsaal or Council Building and the fort of the Nieuwe Republiek'. At the conclusion of the Zulu War of 1879 the Zulu King, Cetshwayo, was deposed, but he was reinstated by Queen Victoria in 1883. However, one of his headmen, Sibebu, drove him out, and he died in February, 1884. His son, Dinizulu, continued the struggle Type of site: Governance Previous use: other: Council chambers. Current use: museum. Historical and architectural interest – The old New Republic Raadsaal and Fort are intimately associ
9/2/448/0019	Old Bantu Administration Building, Landrost Street, Vryheid	Rectangular building; smooth white-washed walls (rusticated); corrugated iron roof; eight sash window The Bantu Administration building is a long rectangular building with smooth white washed walls, rusticated at each end. The roof is of corrugated iron and the facade has eight evenly spaced sash windows. The entrance to the building is surrounded by dres Type of site: Office building Current use: offices. This rectangular building dates from about 1930 and forms, especially from an architectural point of view, an integral part of the historic core of Vryheid.	Vryheid, Central	Vryheid	Provincial Heritage Site	27°46′03″S 30°47′45″E	Upload Photo
9/2/448/0021	Area Between Old Raadsaal and Carnegie Library, Vryheid (now consolidated with the Old New Republic Raadsaal and Fort properties – file closed)	Current use: other: vacant land. This vacant site, situated between the Old New Republic Raadsaal and Fort, and the Carnegie Library,	Vryheid, Central	Vryheid	Provincial Heritage Site	27°46′01″S 30°48′00″E	Upload Photo
9/2/448/0022	Police Station, Landdrost (Cnr Church) Street, Vryheid	Huge sandstone building; corrugated iron roof with decorative wrought-iron railing; doors and window This sandstone building with its Victorian verandah dates from the end of the last century and forms an essential part of the historic and architectural character of Landdrost Street. Type of site: Police Station Current use: police station. This sandstone building with its Victorian verandah dates from the end of the last century and forms	Vryheid, Central	Vryheid	Provincial Heritage Site	27°46′01″S 30°48′00″E	Upload Photo
9/2/449/0002	Coolamgause Building, Retief Street, Weenen	These two typical Indian shops date from the beginning of the twentieth century and from an impressive architectural entity. Type of site: commercial Current use: trading stores. These two typical Indian shops date from the beginning of the twentieth century and from an impressive architectural entity.	Weenen	Weenen	Provincial Heritage Site	28°51′00″S 30°04′00″E	These two typical Indian shops date from the beginning of the twentieth century and from an impressive architectural entity. Type of site: commercial Current use: trading stores. These two typical Indian shops date from the beginning of the twentieth century and from an impressive architectural entity.
9/2/449/0003	Abdoolgafoor Goolamsahib Arabian Merchant, Retief Street, Weenen	Type of site: commercial Current use: trading stores. Historical and Architectural – These two typical Indian shops date from the beginning of the twentie	Weenen	Weenen	Provincial Heritage Site	28°51′00″S 30°04′00″E	Type of site: commercial Current use: trading stores. Historical and Architectural – These two typical Indian shops date from the beginning of the twentie
