= List of Hindu temples outside India =

Apart from India, where the vast majority Hindu population lives, Hindu Temples are found across the world, on every continent. In the Indian subcontinent, thousands of modern and historic temples are spread across Nepal, Sri Lanka, Bangladesh and Pakistan. Outside the region, the oldest temples can be found in Cambodia, Thailand, Myanmar, Malaysia and Indonesia where ancient seafaring empires like the Chola Empire and Vijayanagara Empire spread their dominions.

In the early modern period, Fiji, Guyana, Kenya, Malaysia, Mauritius, Réunion, Myanmar, Seychelles, Singapore, South Africa, Suriname, Tanzania, Trinidad and Tobago and Uganda, have seen many temples being built, as the Indian Diaspora settled across these areas over the past 250–300 years.

== Australia ==
- Bala Murugan Temple, Perth
- Perth Shiva Temple, Perth
- Sydney Durga Temple, Sydney

== Azerbaijan ==
Name	Location	Main Deity	Image
Fire Temple	Baku	Multiple gods	Fire Temple of Baku in Azerbaijan

== Bahrain ==
- Shri Krishna Temple, Manama
- Shrinathji Temple, Bahrain
- Durga Mata Temple, Bramco
- BAPS Center, Manama
- ISKCON Balramdesh, Manama

== Cambodia ==
Name	Location	Deity	Image
Angkor Wat	Angkor, Siem Reap	Vishnu	
Baksei Chamkrong	Angkor, Siem Reap	Shiva	
Banteay Samré	Angkor, Siem Reap	Vishnu	
Banteay Srei	Angkor, Siem Reap	Shiva	
Chau Say Tevoda	Angkor, Siem Reap	Shiva and Vishnu	
Phimeanakas	Angkor, Siem Reap		
Phnom Bakheng	Angkor, Siem Reap	Shiva	
Prasat Phnom Bok	Angkor, Siem Reap	Brahma, Shiva, and Vishnu	
Prasat Phnom Krom	Angkor, Siem Reap	Brahma, Shiva, and Vishnu	
Preah Vihear	Dângrêk Mountains, Preah Vihear	Shiva	
Thommanon	Angkor, Siem Reap	Shiva and Vishnu	
West Mebon	Angkor, Siem Reap	Vishnu	

== Fiji ==
- Sri Siva Subramaniya Temple, Nadi

== Ghana ==
- Ghana Hindu Monastery, Accra

== Guyana ==
- Tain Hindu Mandir

== Iran ==
- Bandar Abbas Vishnu Temple

== Kenya ==
- BAPS Shri Swaminarayan Mandir Nairobi
- Shri Swaminarayan Mandir, Nairobi (EASS)

== Laos ==
- Vat Phou - ruined Khmer temple, southern Laos (was converted to a Buddhist Monastery in the 13th-century)

== Mauritius ==
- Ganga Talao (Grand Bassin), Savanne district
- Mangal Mahadev, Savanne district
- Maheswarnath Mandir, Triolet, Pamplemousses district
- Sagar Shiv Mandir, Poste de Flacq, Flacq district

== Myanmar ==
- Nathlaung Kyaung Temple – dedicated to Vishnu, Bagan (formerly Pagan), Mandalay Region
- Shri Kali Temple (Tamil temple), Yangon

== Netherlands ==
- Sri Vishnu Mandir (Tempo Doeloestraat 250, 1336 NB Almere)
- Lord Shiva Hindu Temples (Hoogoorddreef 79, 1101 BB Amsterdam)
- Stichting Shri Vishnu Mandier (Karel du Jardinstraat 60-HS, 1073 TC Amsterdam)
- Devi Dhaam Mandir, (Grubbe hoeve 32, 1103 GH Amsterdam)
- Hare Krishna Amsterdam (Lizzy Ansinghstraat 80, 1072 RD Amsterdam)
- Radha Krishna Mandir Amsterdam (Saaftingestraat 310, 1069 BW Amsterdam)
- Shri Shiv Mandir (Zuringstraat 12, 6833 ER Arnhem)
- Arulmigu Sri Arunachaleswarar Temple (Elbestraat 2, 1946 XH Beverwijk)
- Shri Ganesh Mandir (Mereveldtlaan 2, 3454 CG De Meern)
- Shri Radha Krishna Mandir (Jan van Gojenstraat 92, 2526 RM Den Haag)
- Shri Ram Mandir (Mijtensstraat 183, 2525 VC Den Haag)
- Dew Mandir (Gaslaan 74, 2562 LL Den Haag)
- Sewa Dhaam Mandir (Alberdingk Thijmplein 34, 2524HV Den Haag)
- Arya Samaj Nederland (ASAN) (1e van der Kunstraat 75, 2521 AS Den Haag)
- Sri Sri Radhe Syam Mandir (Dalerveenstraat 9, 2545 NA Den Haag)
- Shri Krishna Dhaam (Weimarstraat 213, 2562 HG Den Haag)
- Shri Varatharaja Selvavinayagar Temple (Tamil) (Annie Romein Verschoorlaan 32, 1784 NZ Den Helder)
- Hare Krishna ISKCON Eindhoven (Zeelsterstraat 186, 5652 EP Eindhoven)
- Shi Shiv Mandir (Vlokhovenseweg 41, 5625 WT. Eindhoven)
- Triloki Dhaam Mandir (Tongelresestraat 371, 5642 NC Eindhoven)
- Murugan Tempel Limburg (Tamil) (Litscherveldweg 15, 6413 BA Heerlen)
- Sri Ram Mandir (Putselaan 194, 3073 JM Rotterdam)
- Shri Durga Mandir (Nieuwedijk 6, 3195 GD Rotterdam)
- Shri Shiv Mandir (Nozemanstraat 3, 3023 TK Rotterdam)
- Audarya Dhaam temple (Schiekade 99c, 3033 BE Rotterdam)
- Shri Nanda Devi Mandir (Philips de Goedestraat 151, 3132 XT Vlaardingen)
- Shree Raam Mandir (Stationslaan 18, 6602 BP Wijchen)
- Shri Vishnu Mandir (Tienlingstraat 15 D, 1507 JD Zaandam)
- Shri Laxmi Narayan Mandir (Prismalaan 50, 2718 CX Zoetermeer)
- Sri Balaji Temple (Stichting Vasudhaiva Kutumbakam, Pandgat 17, 5688 KK Oirschot Netherlands)

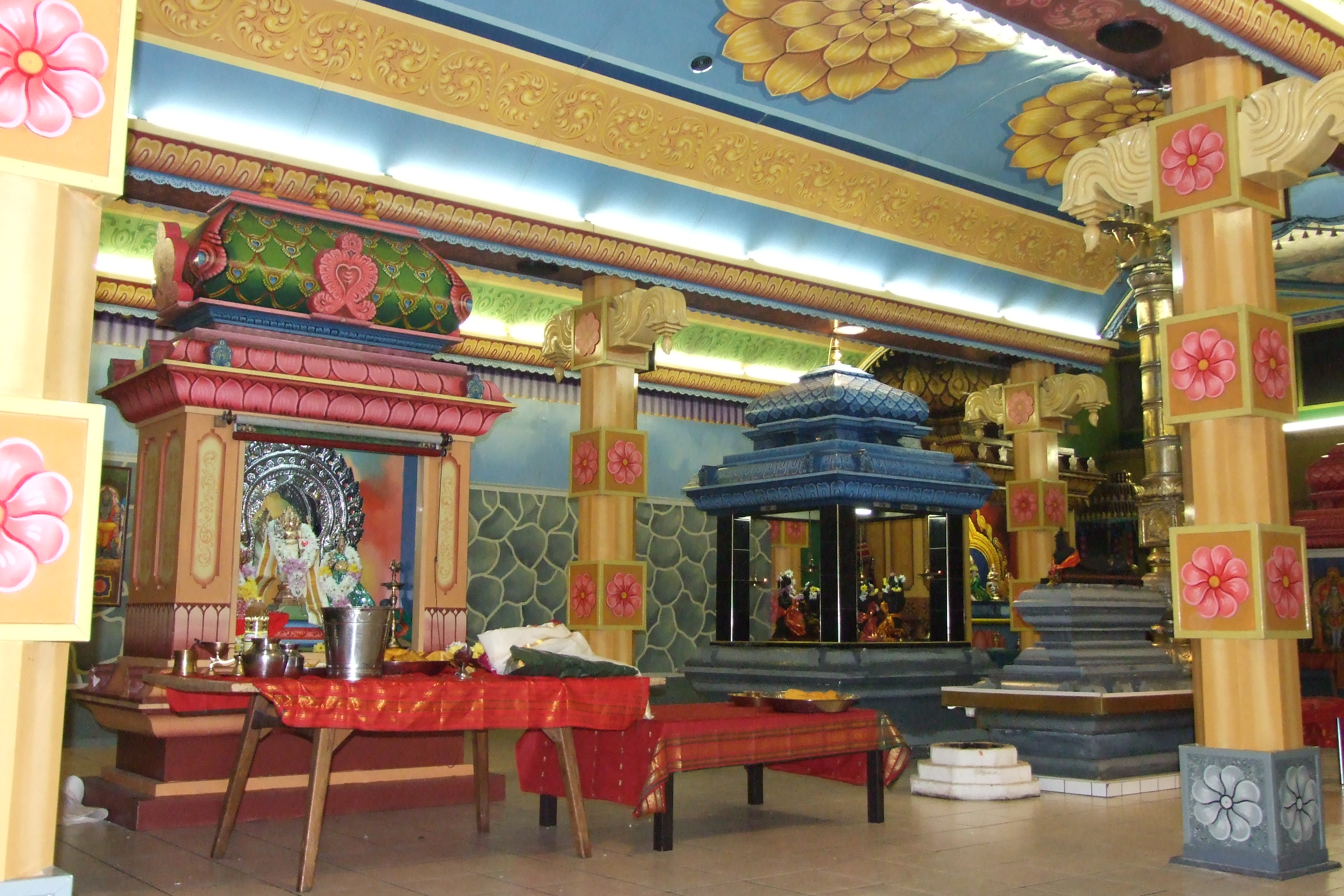
Murugan Temple, Roermond, Netherlands

== New Zealand ==
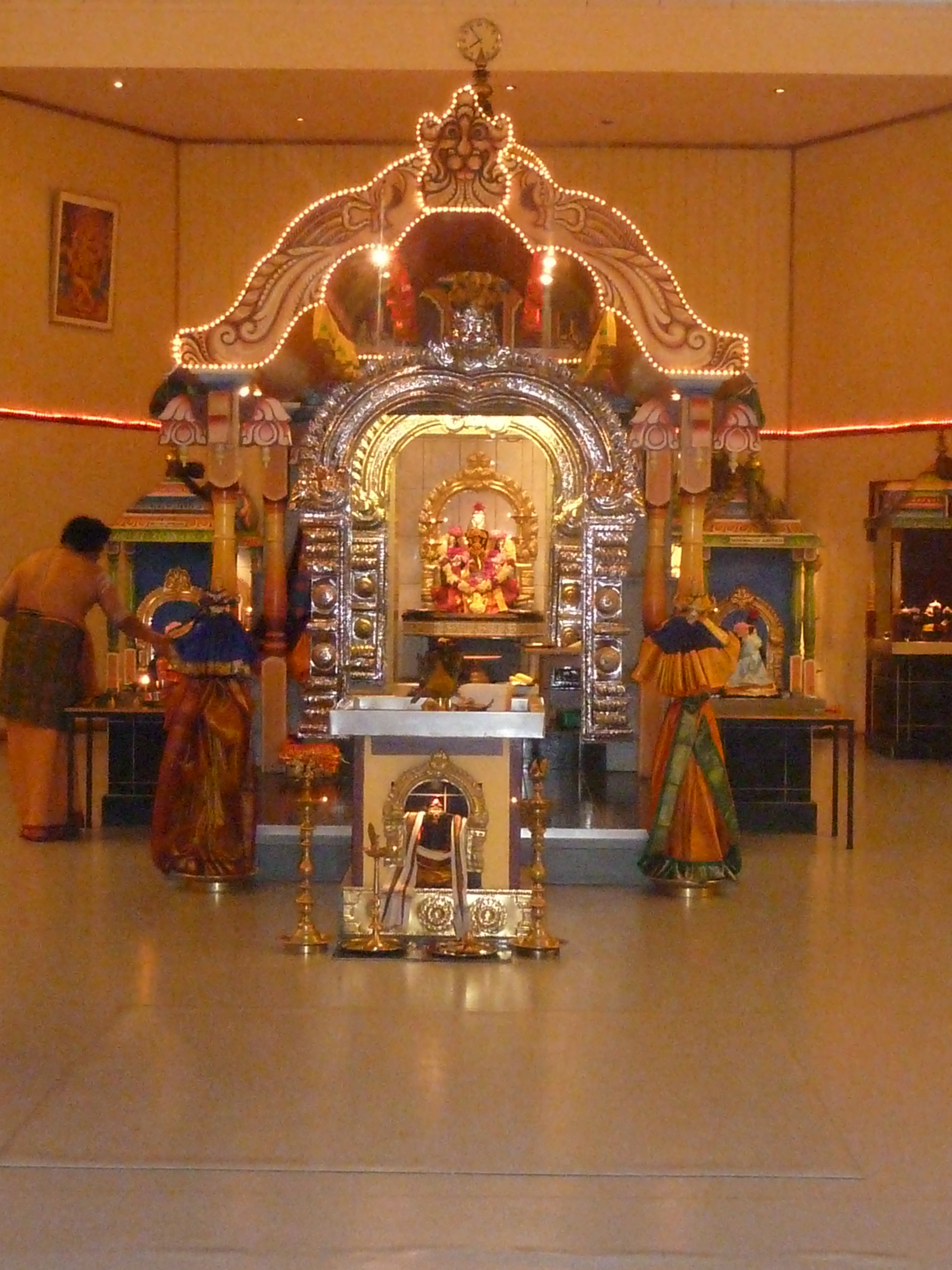
Bergen Hindu Sabha Ganapati Mulasthanum in Norway

== Oman ==
- Motishwar Mandir, Muttrah, Muscat
- Krishna Temple, Muscat

== South Africa ==
- Mariamman Temple
- Madhya Kailash Temple Midrand, 52 Stag Road Glen Austin EXT 3 Midrand
- Narainsamy Temple, Durban
- Mount Edgecombe Ganesha Temple, Mount Edgecombe
- Shri Jagannath Puri Temple

== South Korea ==
- Himalayan Meditation and Yoga Sadhana Mandir, Seocho, Seoul
- Sri Lakshmi Narayanan Temple, Seoul
- Sri Radha Shyamasundar Mandir - central Seoul

== Sri Lanka ==
- Kataragama temple
- Nallur Kandaswamy temple
- Pancha Ishwarams

== Suriname ==
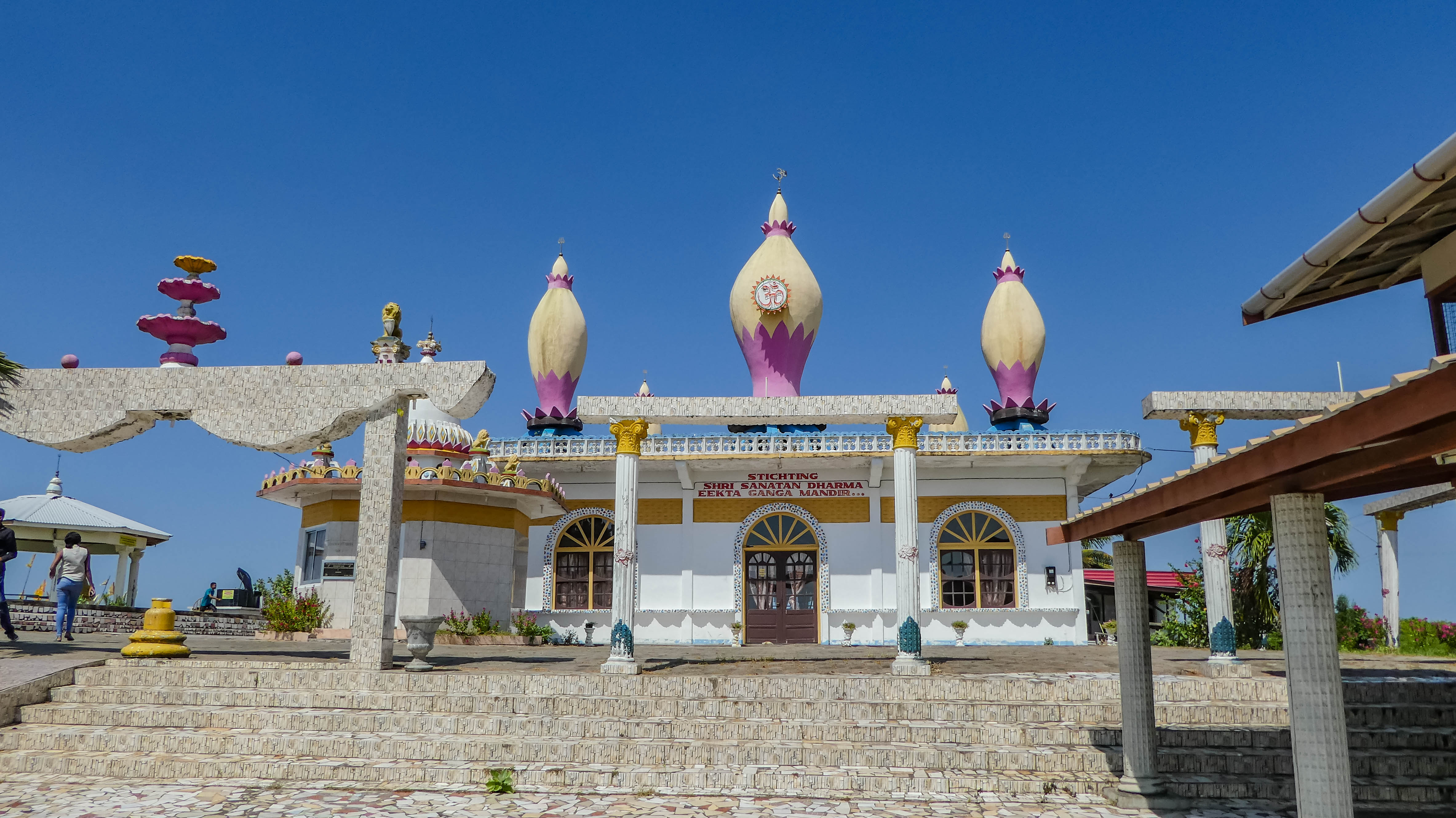
Hindu Temple Eekta Ganga Mandir in Nickerie

- Arya Diwaker

== Switzerland ==
- Sri Sivasubramaniar Temple

== Thailand ==
Bangkok

- Mariamman Temple - Bangkok, Silom Road
- Vishnu Temple, Sathon (วัดวิษณุ)
- Erawan Shrine
- Phra Indra Shrine
- Lakshmi Shrine

Chiang Rai

- Wat Phra Mae Si Maha Umathew (วัดพระแม่ศรีมหาอุมาเทวี)
- Pikanesuan Devalai Chiangmai
- Ganesha Temple Sanpantong

Lampang

- Ganesha Nakorn Thoen-Wat Khaek (พระพิฆเนศนครเถิน-วัดแขกลำปาง)

Nakhon Si Thammarat

- Hor Phra Isuan

Pattaya

- Shree Jyotirlingeshwasher Shiva Dhaam (เทวาลัยพระศิวะเทพ พัทย/Shiv Temple Pattaya)
- ISKCON Pattaya

Phuket

- Phra Phrom Square, Rawai, Mueang Phuket District, Phuket (ลานพระพรหม)
- ISKCON Phuket, Phuket
- Kuil Thandayudapani Murugan Phuket(பூகெட் தண்டாயுதபாணி முருகன் கோவில்/วมูลนิธิภูเก็ตตันดายูดาปานี)
- Shree Bhagawat Dhaam Sanatan Mandir, Pa Tong, Phuket (Phuket Sivan Temple/ศรี ภควัต ธัม ศานาตัน มัณฑีร์/श्री भागवत धाम सनातन मंदिर)

Songkhla

- Kuil Ganesh Dannok|Dannok Ganesh Temple, Dannok, Sadao (พระพิฆเนศด่านนอก/ தன்னோக் விநாயகர் கோவில் )

Surat Thani

- Sri Ganesha Temple, Phunphin, Surat Thani (เทวสถานศรีฆเนศวร)

Khmer temples

- Mueang Sing historical park
- Muang Tum
- Phanom Rung historical park
- Phimai historical park - important Khmer temples, Phimai, Nakhon Ratchasima province
- Phra That Dum
- Phra That Narai Cheng Weng
- Phra That Phu Pek
- Prasat Sikhoraphum
- Sdok Kok Thom

== United Arab Emirates ==
Abu Dhabi

- BAPS Abu Dhabi Mandir

Dubai

- Hindu Temple, Dubai, Shiva Mandir and Sri Krishna Mandir and Gurudwara - near Dubai Museum, Bur Dubai, Dubai.
- Hindu Temple Jebel Ali Dubai.

== Vietnam ==
- Mariamman Temple - Ho Chi Minh City
- Mỹ Sơn - Duy Phú, Central Vietnam
- Po Klong Garai - n. Phan Rang, southern Vietnam
- Po Nagar- n. Nha Trang, southern Vietnam

== See also ==
- Lists of Hindu temples
- List of Buddhist temples
- Lists of cathedrals
- Lists of mosques
- List of Swaminarayan temples
