= Wat Phra That Choeng Chum =

Buddhist temple in Thailand

- วัดพระธาตุเชิงชุมวรวิหาร
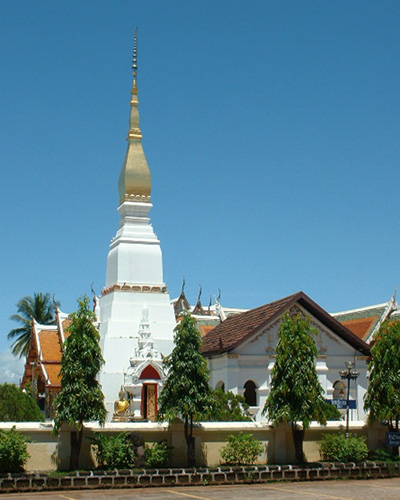

- Location in Thailand

Religion
- Affiliation: Buddhism

Location
- Location: Sakon Nakhon
- Country: Thailand
- Interactive map of Wat Phra That Choeng Chum
- Coordinates: 17.164092°N 104.152912°E

Architecture
- Completed: 12th-16th Century CE

Wat Phra That Choeng Chum (Thai: วัดพระธาตุเชิงชุมวรวิหาร) is a Buddhist temple in Sakon Nakhon province, Thailand. Enshrined there is Phra That Choeng Chum (Thai: พระธาตุเชิงชุม), an important religious monument of the province. Of rectangular shape, it is made of mortar and bricks with a height of 24 meters. It is featured on the reverse of the ten-satang coin.

Sakon Nakhon existed as a major city in the Khmer Empire of Khotraboon, with the ancient city of Srikhotraboon within present-day Udon Thani Province as the capital, at the height of its glory during the 12th to the 16th centuries. Many Khmer shrines and artefacts stand proof to the claim and constitute major attractions of the province. The Shrine of the Holy Relic of Narai Jengweng, Phuphek, Dum and the Khmer Bridge are a few examples.

Phra That Choeng Chum is built to cover footprints of four Buddhas namely Phra Kakusantha, Phra Konakom, Phra Kassapa, and Phra Kodom (the present Buddha) and Phra Sri Ariyametrei (next Buddha). Next to the Phra That is the chapel that houses Luang Por Ong Saen, a sacred Buddha statue of the province.
