= Prei Khmeng, Cambodia =

Prei Khmeng
- ប្រាសាទព្រៃក្មេង (Khmer)
- Prei Khmeng Village
- Location within Cambodia
- 13°25′40″N 103°45′27″E
- Location: Siem Reap Province, Cambodia

History
- Built: 1st–11th centuries CE, reoccupied by early 20th century CE

Site notes
- Architectural styles: Prei Khmeng Lintel Style, Angkorian Temple

Prei Khmeng, or Prei Khmeng village, is an archaeological site located in Siem Reap province, Cambodia. Occupation of Prei Khmeng began during the Iron Age and continued through the 11th century.

Notable features of Prei Khmeng include a cemetery constructed during 1st–6th century CE, as well as an Angkorian temple constructed on top of the cemetery between the 6th and 7th centuries CE.

Excavations at Prei Khmeng have uncovered a total of 10 confirmed burial contexts and a variety of artifacts including ceramics, tools, jewelry, and animal remains. Artifacts at this site indicate that Prei Khmeng was engaged in trade with other sites in the area.

== Background ==
=== Site history ===
An Iron Age occupation occurred at Prei Khmeng during the 1st–6th centuries CE. During this occupation period a cemetery was constructed. A mound and one of the area's earliest pre-Angkor Hindu temples were constructed on top of the cemetery location between the 6th and 7th centuries CE. Occupation of this site continued until the 10th–11th centuries CE.

=== Archaeological excavations ===
The first excavations at Prei Khmeng were conducted by a joint Franco-Cambodian archaeological team, who conducted a series of three excavations between 2000 and 2003. Additional excavations were carried out by an Australian-Cambodian team in 2014.

== Architecture ==
=== Architectural styles ===
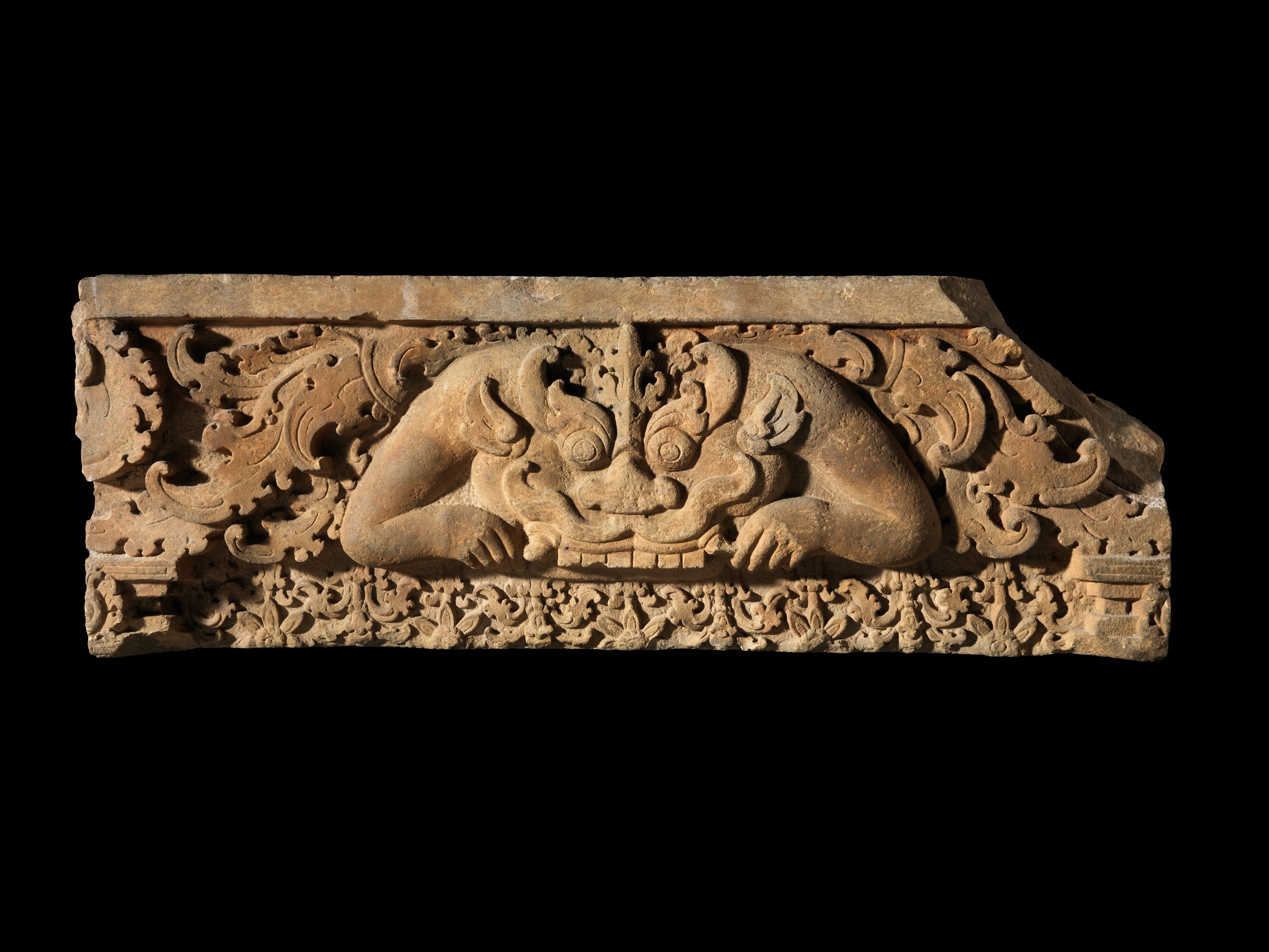
An example of a 7th-century CE sandstone lintel from Cambodia.

The temple found at Prei Khmeng was constructed in the Angkorian style representative of the Khmer Empire, which incorporated many Hindu spiritual concepts into the design of the temple.

The Prei Khmeng name is associated with a series of four distinguishable and well-dated lintel styles, with the Prei Khmeng style beginning in the 7th century CE and ending in the 8th century CE.

The use of inscriptions is found at Prei Khmeng, with some commemorating events that occurred in the 9th and 10th centuries CE.

Bricks recovered from the southern mound are similar to those found in pre and early Angkor period temples.

=== Site and plan ===
The site was originally an Iron-age cemetery and habitual occupation area from the 1st–6th centuries CE. By the 7th century CE, two moats, a mound, and a temple were constructed in the Angkorian style atop the preexisting cemetery. Additionally, wealthy households or other prestigious structures, indicated in the archaeological record through the recovery of ceramic roof tiles and Chinese artifacts, appear to have been constructed on the southern mound.

=== Features ===
==== Moats ====
Before the 7th century construction of the temple, there were no moats on-site. Now, there are two moats located at Prei Khmeng, to the north of the temple-mound and another to the south. The moats were purposefully constructed to not only create the northern temple mound, but are a specific design element central to the construction of Angkorian temples.

==== Mounds ====
Two mounds are found at Prei Khmeng. The northern mound, situated between the two moats, was constructed using soil from said moats, disturbing Iron-age burials in the process. This disturbed soil has only been recovered from the northern mound, suggesting that the entirety of excavated soil from the two moats was used exclusively in the construction of the northern temple-mound.

==== Temple ====
Completed by the beginning of the 7th century CE, the Angkorian brick temple was constructed upon the northern mound. Of note, it is unusual to have a Hindu temple erected upon a cemetery.

==== Other Features ====
A refuse area, post molds, as well as 17 laterite blocks are located on the southern mound.

== Mortuary contexts ==
The 2014 Australian-Cambodian excavation uncovered a total of 10 confirmed mortuary contexts dated to the 2nd–4th centuries CE. Two of these individuals were determined to likely be female, while three or four were likely males. A range of age groups were represented, with the youngest individual recovered determined to be a neonatal infant and the oldest individuals recovered being older middle-aged adults. An additional 11th possible context was also found in this area, containing grave goods but no evidence of human remains.

=== Grave goods ===
The quantity and type of grave goods found varied between the individual mortuary contexts. All uncovered contexts contained bronze bangles and a number of glass, carnelian or agate beads. Additional grave goods found in some but not all of the burials included ceramics, bronze bells and other jewelry, iron tools, and pig skulls. One individual was buried in a grave that had been filled with rice remains.

Mortuary Context 10 was the wealthiest uncovered context. This context belonged to a young adult, presumed female and buried with 95 glass beads, over 14 iron implements, ten bronze bangles, ceramics, clay pellets, a gold hook, a pig mandible, and fish bone.

Evidence indicates that the ceramics found in mortuary contexts had already been used for other purposes, rather than being specifically produced for burials.

=== Evidence for physical Injuries ===
Evidence of physical injuries were found in Contexts 6 and 10, where a male and a presumed female were found with damage to their pelvic regions that was consistent with penetration by a sharp object. The male's pelvic region also showed evidence of blunt force trauma.

=== Dentition ===
Some health issues and abnormalities found at this site were related to dentition. The individual in Context 4 showed evidence of plaque buildup and severely infected gums, while Context 2 contained an individual that suffered from severe periodontal disease and had lost several teeth.

Missing teeth were also observed in the three individuals from Contexts 1, 5, and 9, who showed evidence of one or more of maxillary lateral incisor being removed before death. This type of incisor removal was a trend consistent with other similar burials within this time period and region.

=== Burial position ===
Individuals recovered from Prei Khmeng were buried in either a flexed or supine position. It is likely that the inhabitants buried in flexed position were the initial inhabitants who migrated to Prei Khmeng from Lovea, and were buried with ceramics they brought from their original place of residence.

== Artifacts ==
A variety of artifacts have been recovered from Prei Khmeng, including clay and metal objects, beads, as well as tools.

=== Ceramics ===
A total of 20 burial vessels were found associated with the 2nd–4th centuries CE burial contexts. 19 of these vessels were created using a paddle-and-anvil technique, with the last vessel being hand-molded. Decoration techniques included paint, burnishing, carving, impressing, and cord-marking. A number of non-burial ceramics were also recovered from this period, including vessels, dishes and pellets, a sieve, and a spindle whorl. Ceramics originating from Prei Khmeng were constructed using a quartz-containing clay and tempered with rice husks.

A number of the other ceramics found on site are associated with non-Prei Khmeng locations. Some, particularly those associated with flexed burial contexts, were constructed using clay composition and decorative painting styles that resemble ceramics found at nearby Sophy and Lovea sites. Angkor iron-and ash-glaze ceramics, Phimai Black pottery, Southern Chinese pottery, and a Kulen lid fragment were also recovered from mortuary contexts. Phimai Black pottery is a ceramic tradition associated with archaeological sites in northeast Thailand and may offer evidence for contact with other regions, notably Thailand.

=== Beads ===
Agate, stone, and carnelian beads were recovered from mortuary contexts at Prei Khmeng. Indo-Pacific glass beads containing a high-alumina mineral soda composition were also recovered from mortuary contexts, and indicate that Sri Lanka may have been the original manufacturer of these beads. Nine bronze artifacts have been recovered from mortuary contexts that may have been used as beads.

=== Metal artifacts ===
Metal artifacts found at Prei Khmeng were mainly bronze. They included earrings, bangles, rings, Chinese coins, and a bell. An iron knife was recovered, as well as one gold hook found within a burial context.

A selection of the copper bracelets found at the site were analyzed as part of the Southeast Asian Lead Isotope Project, where their elemental and isotopic data indicated that they were likely produced at or near the village of Xepon in Laos. It is likely that the other metal artifacts were also produced at other sites and brought to Prei Khmeng via trade.

=== Tools ===
Clay pellets found on-site indicate that slingshots or pellet bows were in use at this site, likely for hunting or warfare. An adze fragment was also recovered from Prei Khmeng.

== Paddy Pura ==
In 2014 a season-long excavation of Prei Khemeng occurred due to the Paddy to Pura project financed through a series of grants from the Australian Research Council and managed by the University of Sydney, Australia. The project was led by chief investigators Damian Evans, Dr. Dougald O’Reilly, Dr. Louis Shewan, and partner investigator Dr. Sian Halcrow and their research team. The whole project ran from July 4, 2011, to December 31, 2017, but the researchers only excavated Prei Khemeng in 2014.

Ten burial sites were found within Prei Khmeng's boundaries. All burials were excavated and cataloged by the Paddy Pura project's team. Each grave on the site contained grave goods, with 212 artifacts in total. On average, the graves held more goods on average than at Phum Lovea but considerably fewer than at Phum Sophy.

=== Curled Bodies ===
Of the ten burials, the positioning of the bodies fluctuates. All bodies were laid to rest separately, but five of the ten graves were semi-flexed upon burial. Semi-flexed refers to the torso of a body laying outstretched and the legs curled in or flexed. There was no significant data to indicate if sex or age had an impact on if an individual was buried semi-flexed or extended.

=== Wealth Distribution ===
The small sample size of graves found in Prei Khmeng is not conducive to decisive results, but similarities across multiple ancient Cambodian sites allowed Evans, O’Reilly, and Shewan's team to make comparative observations with the site.

There are three wealth categories that Cambodian burials fall into. Graves fall into different categories based on the number of grave goods and the amount of unique/precious materials buried in them. 50% of the burials fall into the poorest tier, 40% fall into the middle category, and 10% fall into the upper tier. Since 35.7% of burials fall into the middle category for all Cambodian sites studied, making Prei Khemng a typical burial site from a wealth distribution perspective.

Prei Khmeng is different than other Cambodian burials because the amount of unique buried artifacts does not increase with the wealth demographics. The poor burials have a similar quantity of objects to the other categories. The amount does not change, but the type of material does.

The objects found during the Paddy Pura project's excavations are as follows:

39 Bronze bangles, 24 Bronze rings (finger or toe), 2 Bronze earrings, 11 Bronze bells, 9 Bronze coins, 4 Iron knives, 9 Iron sickles, 7 Projectile points, 20 Digging tools, 2 Iron spears, 3 Iron axes, 4 Iron chisels, 1 Gold hook, 722 Glass beads, 13 Agate beads, 1 Carnelian bead, 7 Clay pellets, and 23 Ceramic vessels.

The highest class is easiest to identify because of the Carnelian bead. There is no decisive evidence saying that Carnelian beads like the one found in the upper-tier burial could be manufactured in Cambodia, most evidence points to external manufacturing in South Asia, then import into Cambodia. The exotic nature of the bead indicated that wealth disparity in the upper-tier burial vers lower because it was a very rare material.

Poor and middle-class burials have similar objects found across them. Bronze jewelry and iron weaponry were found in the middle class and poor burials, but the concentration of their objects is interpreted by the Paddy Pura team as prestige goods were different, indicating different wealth or social status.
