= Wat Vihear Suor =

Royal Buddhist monastery in Cambodia

Coordinates: 11.6685°N 105.0566°E

- វត្តវិហារសួគ៌
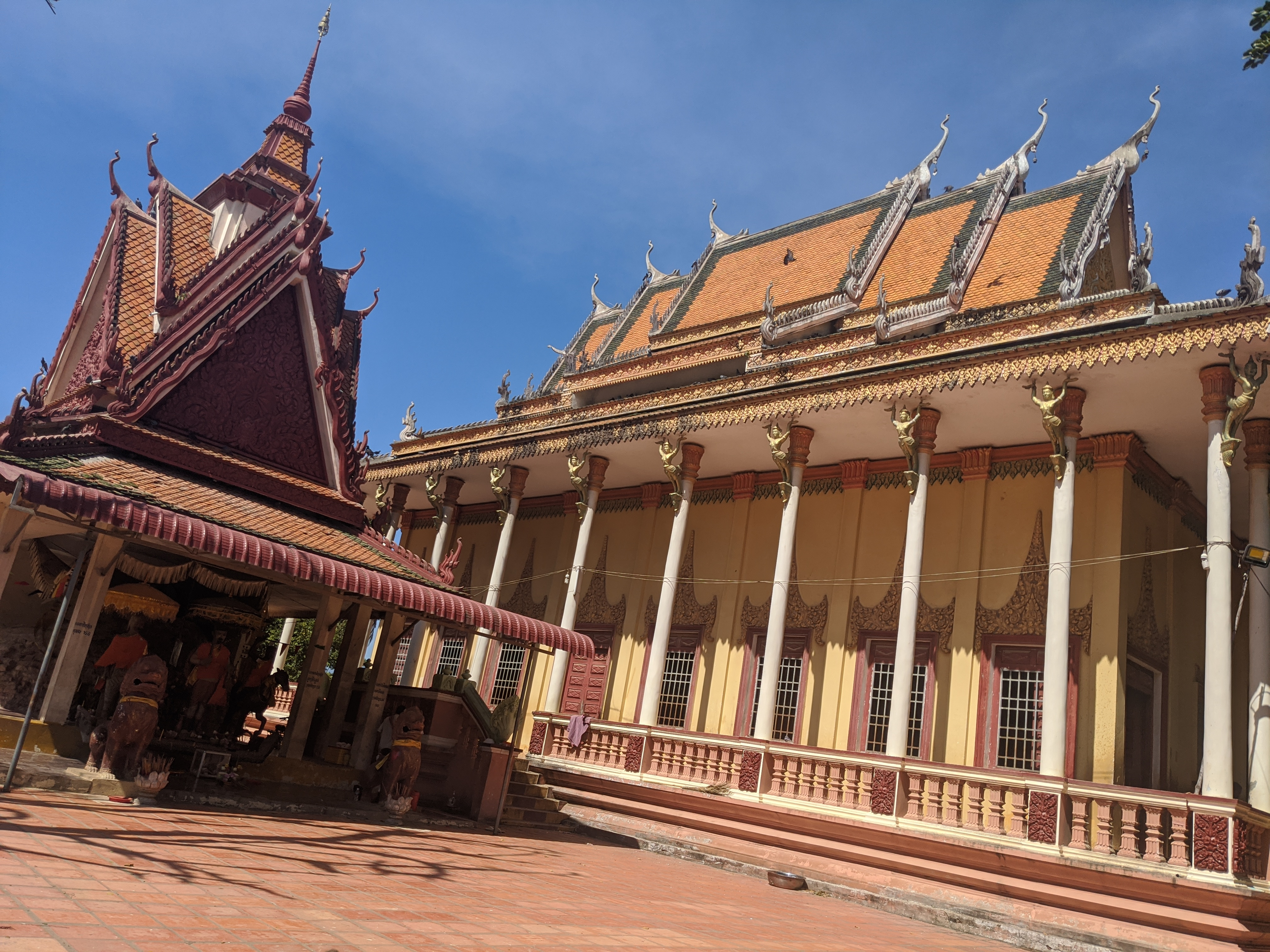

- Location within Cambodia

Religion
- Affiliation: Theravada Buddhism

Location
- Location: Srey Santhor District, Kandal Province
- Country: Cambodia
- Interactive map of Wat Vihear Suor

Architecture
- Founder: Baksei Chamkrong (legend)
- Completed: 15th-16th century

Wat Vihear Suor (Khmer: វត្តវិហារសួគ៌) is a Theravada Buddhist temple located in Kandal Province, Cambodia. It was built on an older pre-Buddhist cult site belonging to the Angkor era.

== Etymology ==
Wat Vihear Suor literally translates as the "Pagoda of the Heavenly Temple".

== Legend: a tale of two cities ==
The main cult of the temple of Vihear Suor seems to have been dedicated to the mythical king Baksei Chamkrong, literally “a king who is covered under bird’s wings”, referring to the legendary bird protecting the Khmer king and royalty. According to the Royal Chronicles, Baksei Chamkrong would be the founder of the line of post-Angkorian kings. As the legend goes, a King tried to escape Angkor to flee the enemy but was brought back on the wings of the Baksei Chamkrong to return to victory.

Another legend of Baksei Chamkrong is attested in Dav Ek's novel which would be contemporary since it dates from the reign of Chey Chettha III which could explain the date of its composition. Baksei Chamkrong is also the name of a temple mountain in Angkor Wat complex, conveniently connecting the Khmer monarchy with its Angkorian roots after its flight to Oudong.

According to this legend, the pagoda was built by Baksei Chamkrong, an 11th-century Cambodian king. It was constructed in gratitude for his escape from the forces of his predecessor, Punhea Krek, who wanted to kill him. One morning Krong was woken by the calling of water fowl, warning him that the king's troops were coming. After the death of King Punhea Krek, Krong was appointed his successor, and to remind his citizens of his plight at Krek's hands, he ordered temples built at several places important to him on his journey. A temple was then built on the hill where the waterfowl woke him in Vihear Suor.

== History ==
Wat Vihear Suor has since its foundation been a monastery of royal significance in Cambodia.

=== A royal sanctuary for the monarchy after the fall of Angkor ===
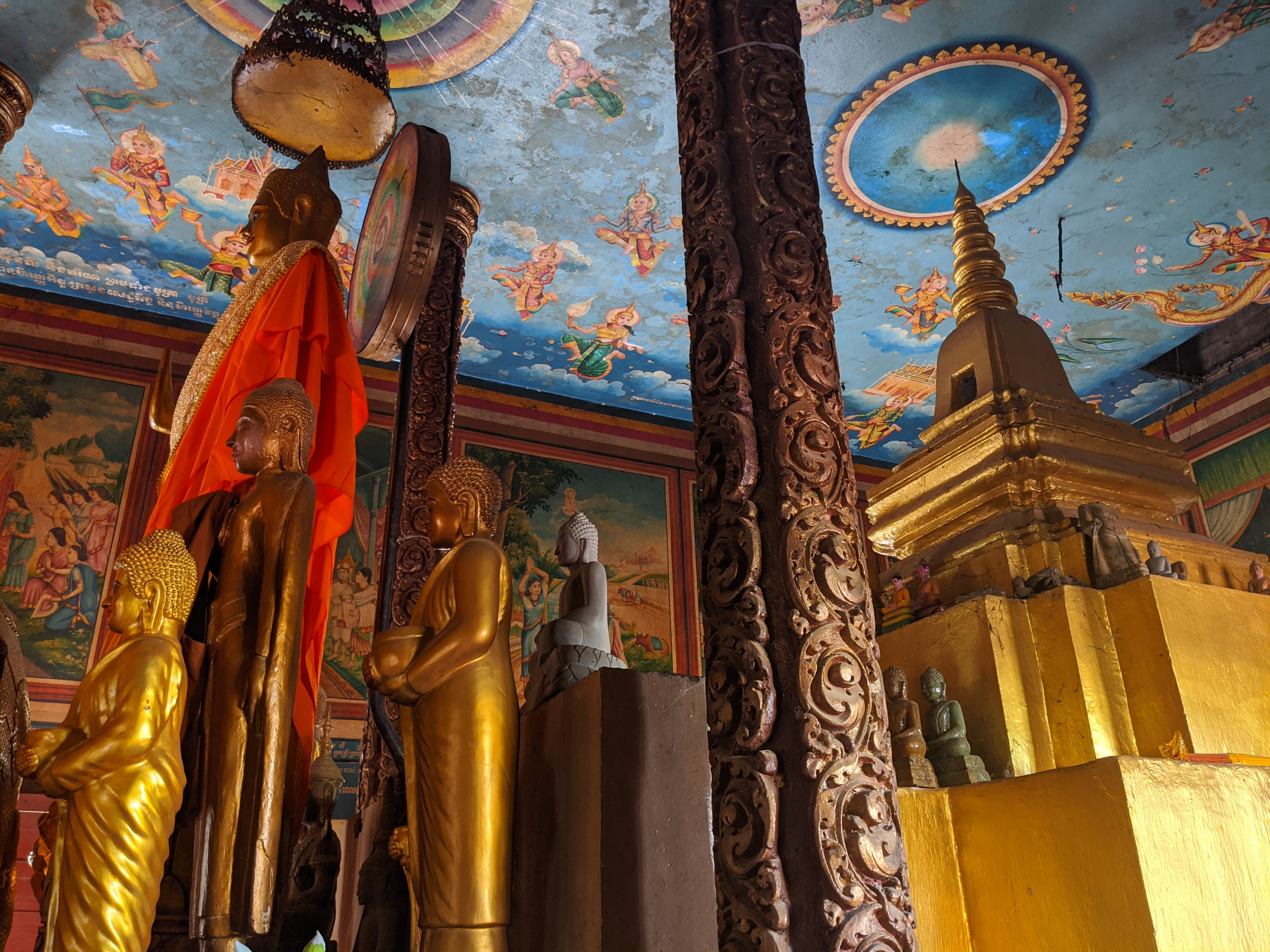
Buddhist sanctuary and ancestral stupa have been physically fused.

According to tradition, in 1525, Sdach Korn was buried at Vihear Suor, where one of the stupas still claims to hold his remains.

Theravada Buddhism probably came to the area during the 16th century. Srei Santhor, was one of the medieval capitals—and nearby Wat Vihear Suor is also of a royal foundation of early post-Angkorian date. Relative dating of sculpture and large stupas at Wat Sithor, Preah Vihear Suor, and Wat Yeay Bang suggests a workshop of artists, architects, and builders active under elite patronage between the fifteenth and beginning of the sixteenth century. During the reign of Satha I (1576–1594), Longvek itself came under Thai attack. The king protected his capital by venerating the potent Buddha Kaya Siddhi image at Wat Brah Inda Deba and worshipping at the shrine of Khleang Moeung. To counter these supernatural defenses, two wizards disguised as Buddhist monks were sent to Cambodia by the Thai king, probably Naresuan (r. 1590–1605). Gaining the king's confidence, they drove Satha insane, convincing him that his problems emanated from the malign influences of the Buddha Kaya Siddhi and the previously mentioned Buddha of Wat Tralaeng Kaeng. Satha ordered both images to be broken and thrown into the river. The chronicles tell us that this caused not only the sacred sword of Khmer kingship, preah khan reach to rust but also a Buddha image at Vihear Suor, Srei Santhor, to crack and bleed among other ominous signs.

In 1673, a battle broke out close to Wat Vihear Suor between the Khmer and the Vietnamese troops, which resulted in the capture of Chey Chettha III.

=== An official chapel for the Royal Palace of Phnom Penh ===
At the beginning of the 20th century, Lunet de Lajonquière, described the sight before the damages later caused by the Civil War in Cambodia:

“In the northern vihear is deposited a reduction of a stupa carved in a single block of lacquered and gilded sandstone; this piece, which measures more than 2 meters in height, rests on a pedestal.”

— Etienne Lunet de Lajonquière, Inventaire descriptif des monuments du Cambodge, 1902

The royal importance of the Vihear Suor was confirmed when in 1930, adjacent to the Khemarin Palace on the north side of the Royal Palace of Cambodia, a small sanctuary named in honor of Vihear Sour was built within the compound the Royal Palace for private ceremonies of the royal family and it was restored in the 1950s by King Sihanouk.

In 1962, King Norodom Sihanouk made gave a historical speech during his visit to Wat Vihear Sour. Wat Vihear Suor was a locus for various royal rites until the late 1960s, when some snang claimed that their powers had become severely limited by Sihanouk's absence from the country.

=== The theater of the Civil War in Cambodia ===
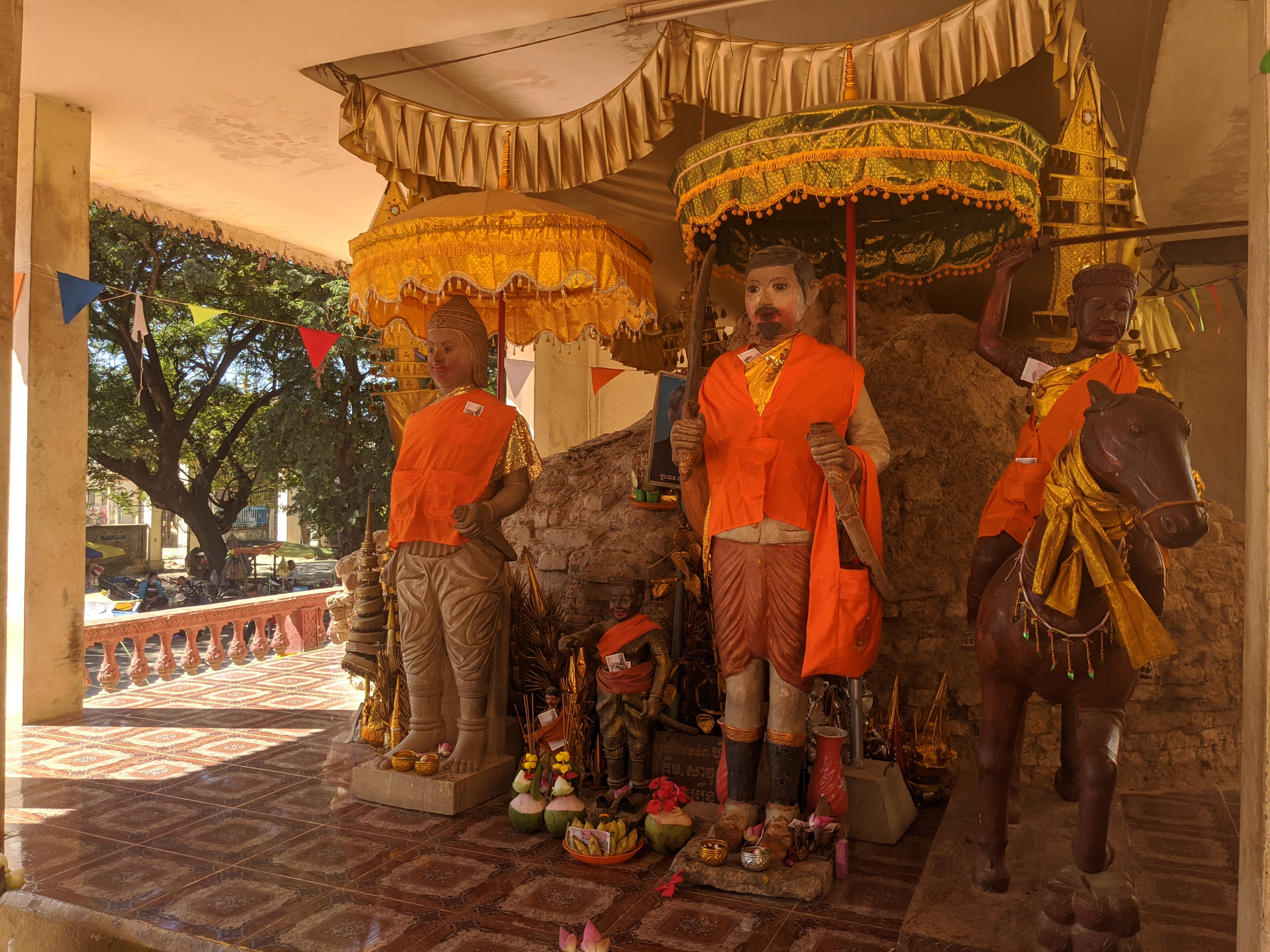
Old and new structures blend together at Vihear Suor, while statues reflect a violent history.

On June 9, 1971, at the beginning of the Civil War in Cambodia, communists rockets and mortar fire struck the surroundings of Vihear Suor, turning the pagoda into a strategic battlefield on the road to Phnom Penh as the violence escalated between the Khmer Issarak and the US-backed army of the Khmer Republic. At the beginning of May 1973, after being encircled for the three months in and around the pagoda of Vihear Suor, the important government garrison was forced to capitulate in front of the Issarak troops. In November 1973, the Beijing Review celebrated the attacks of the insurgent troops on Vihear Suor, as a milestone in controlling the third strategic city around Phnom Penh. By December 1973, Wat Vihear Suor had become the siege of the only provincial capital in Cambodia under the control of the Royal Government of the National Union of Kampuchea known as the GRUNK forces, faithful to Norodom Sihanouk in exile. In February 1974, the Khmer police were ordered to withdraw from the administrative post of Vihear Suor to avoid loss of arms to the Issarak, as the governor of Kandal acknowledged that "the rebel grip has extended across the Bassac to the right bank and is tending to spread west and encircle the capital more and more tightly." In April 1974, C-130s of the United States army hauled rice from Phnom Penh to be rigged for high-velocity descent on Vihear Sour, however, the supplies were intercepted by the Khmers rouges, showing the growing control of the Khmers rouges over Eastern Cambodia. On November 20, 1974, the governmental position of Vihear Sur was evacuated by the garrison and by the end of 1974, a substantial arsenal had been assembled at the Wat Vihear Suor by the Liberation Army of Kampuchea. But in February 1975, the temple was badly damaged when the surroundings of the Wat Vihear Suor were the stage of heavy military conflict and the positions of the Khmer army were destroyed as T-28 aircraft bombed the area. While many pagodas in Kandal Province were dismantled by the Khmers rouges, Vihear Suor was an exception as it served as a rice storehouse.

=== The restoration of a historical pagoda of political importance ===
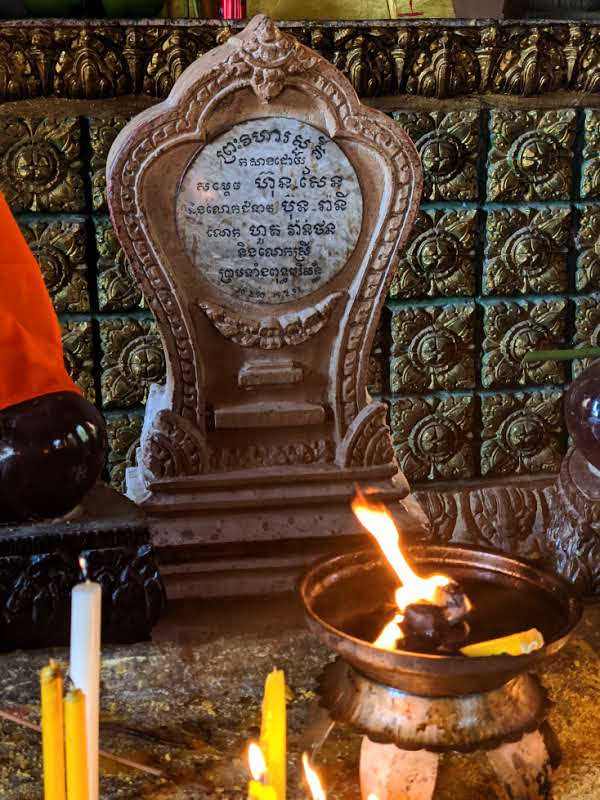
An ex-voto in the shape of a bai sema, placed inside the main temple, acknowledges the major donation of Prime Minister Hun Sen towards the renovation of the monastery.

After the fall of the communist regime in Cambodia, Wat Vihear Suor was one of the most devastated historical buildings of Cambodia.

Already in the late 1980s, King Sihanouk began another restoration of the Vihear Suor chapel inside the Palace Walls. Wat Vihear Suor in Kandal province was later restored in the 1990s by King Sihanouk and Hun Sen, the Prime minister and his wife Bun Rany topping the list of donors in its recent renovation.

The temple became important places of prayer during the election campaigns in Cambodia in the 1990s, as Prime Minister Hun and Minister of Foreign Affairs Ung Huot came to make propitiatory offerings during kathen festivals in 1996 and once more after the 1997 crisis.

Today it houses a famous shrine to the neak ta Yay Tep, who occupies a small Buddha image standing midway between the two sanctuaries. Many snang associate themselves with the royal cult once again at this location.

== Architecture ==
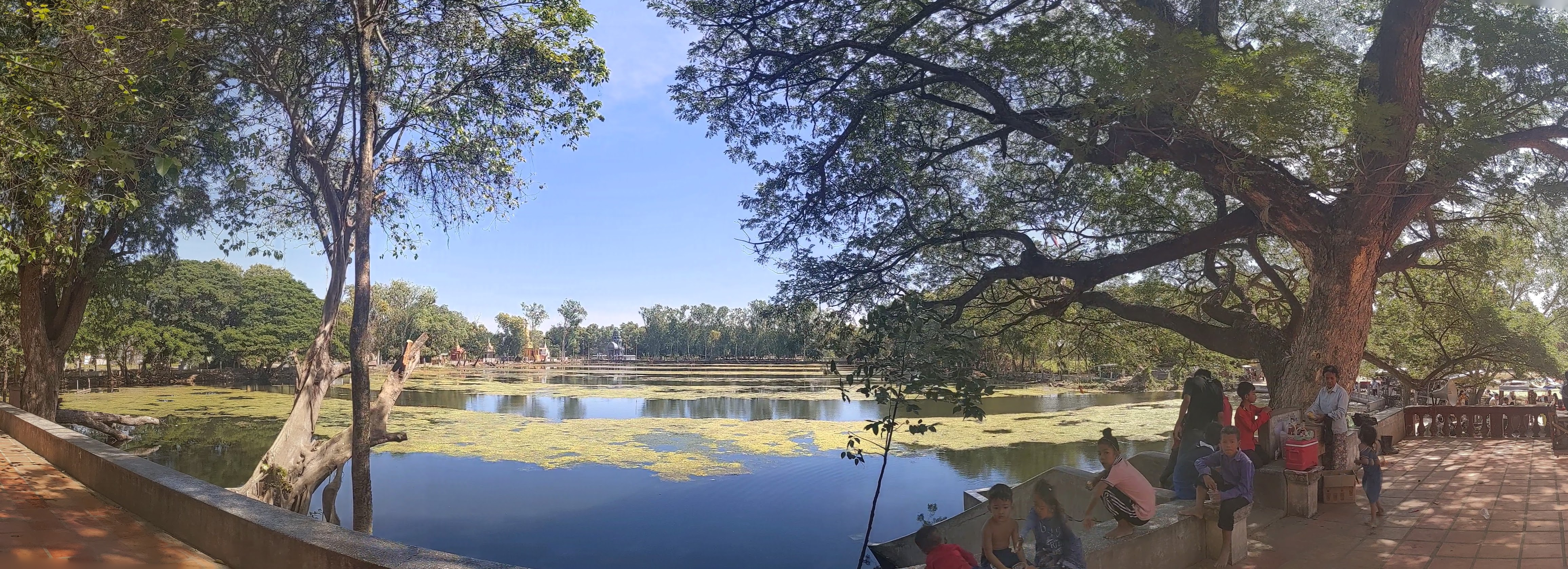
Next to the religious constructions lies a large borey dating back to the Angkorian era.

Almost all archaeological traces of the Angkorian period were demolished, due to the construction of many new buildings and Vihears on the ancient temples. In fact, Buddhist sanctuary and ancestral stupa have been physically fused.

The buddhist pagoda of Vihear Suor is among other pagodas in the area of Basan such as Wat Mae Ban, Wat Sithor, and Wat Ang Chonloeng, which have their own specificity that differs from that of other areas: the compound of these pagodas consists of two Vihears, placed on the same row or on the same platform.

The structure of the Wat Vihear Suor suggests a coherent configuration of the early Theravada complex, widely adopted at the beginning of the middle period, indicating that after the fall of Angkor, the Khmer court brought with it a resilient and historically motivated religious structure.

The site also has several other constructions like a water reservoir (baray) which belongs to the Angkor period (9th-15th centuries).

== Decoration ==
A number of post-Angkorian statues can still be seen at Wat Vihear Suor.

== Practises ==
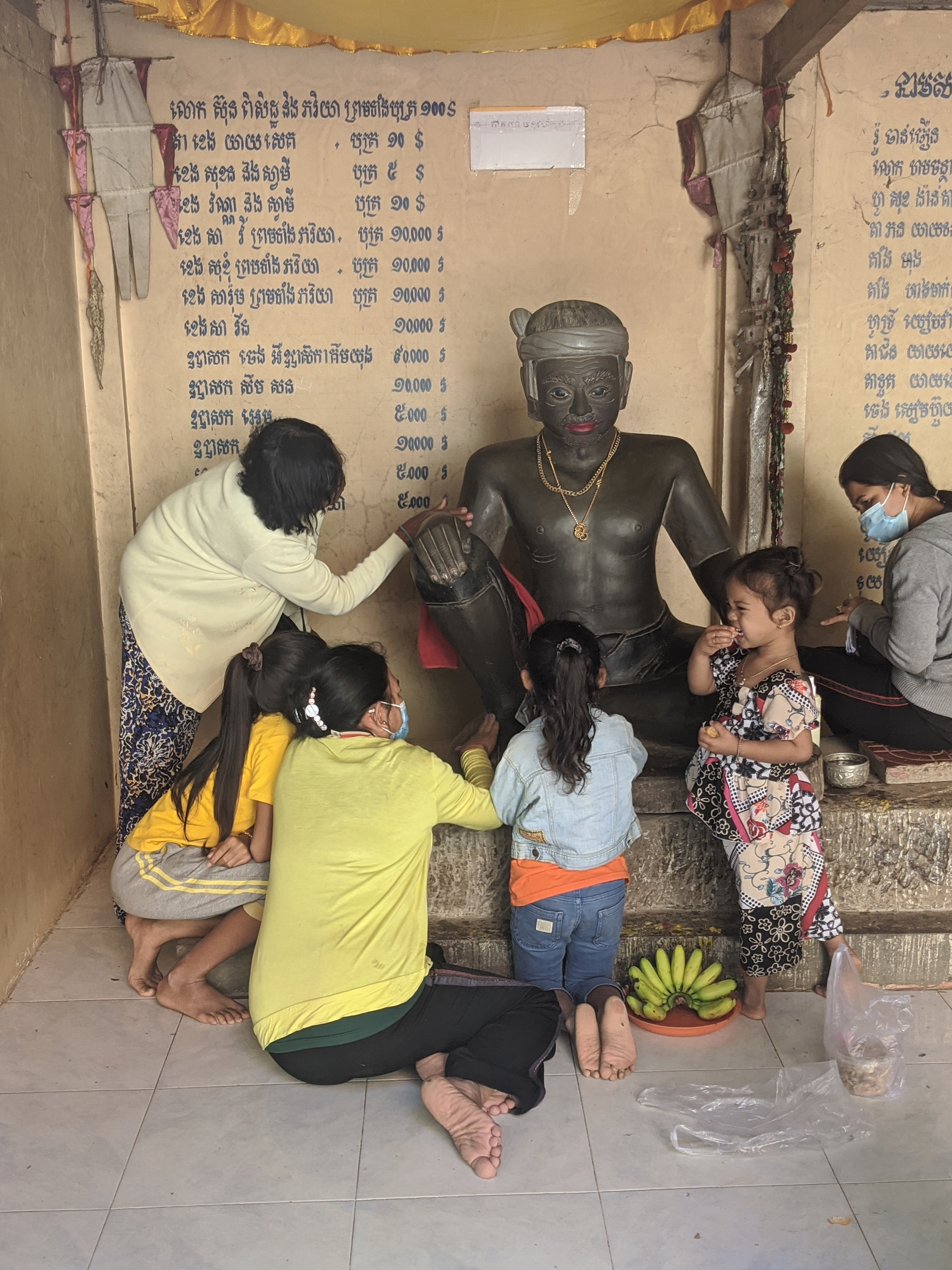
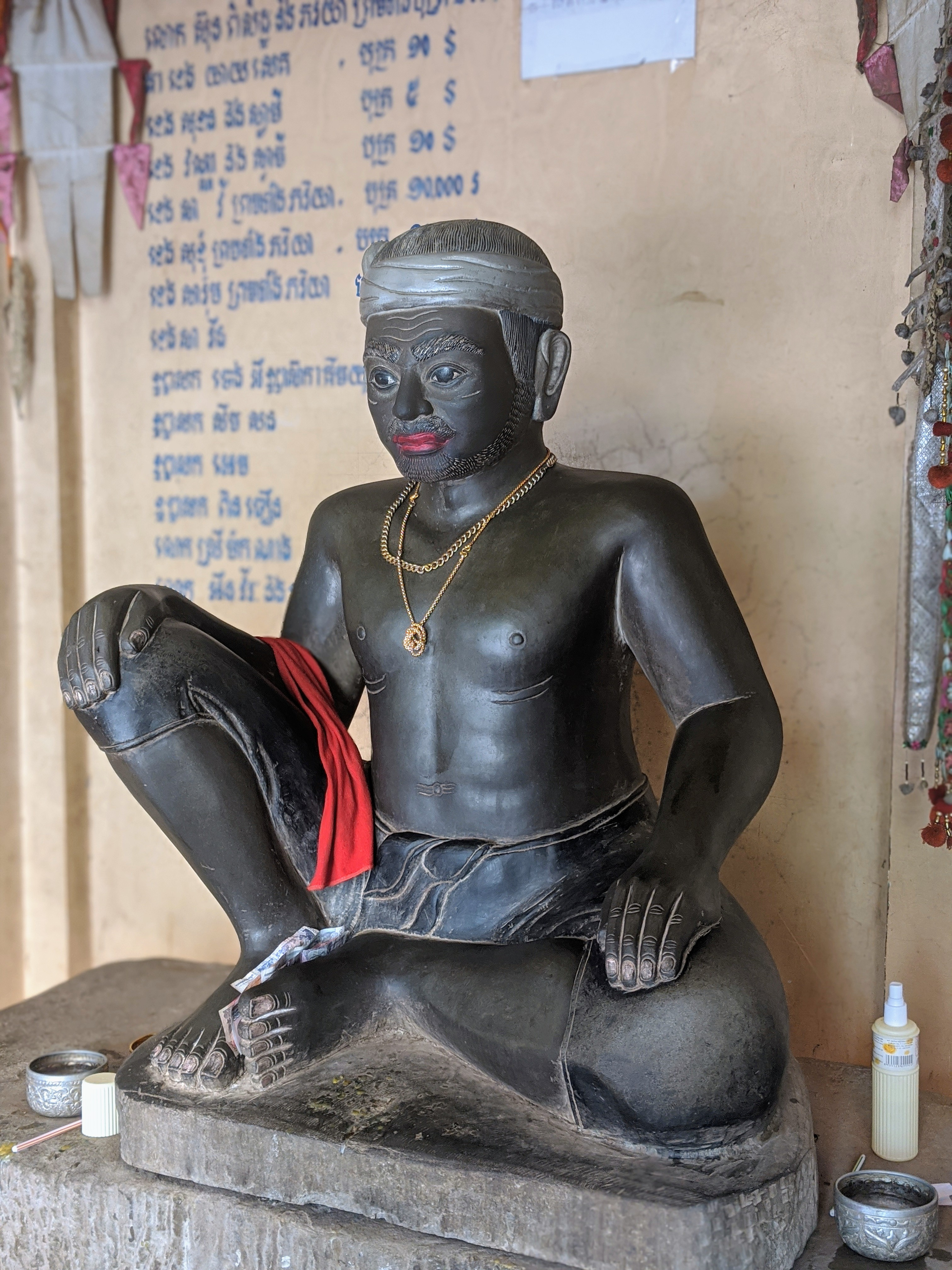
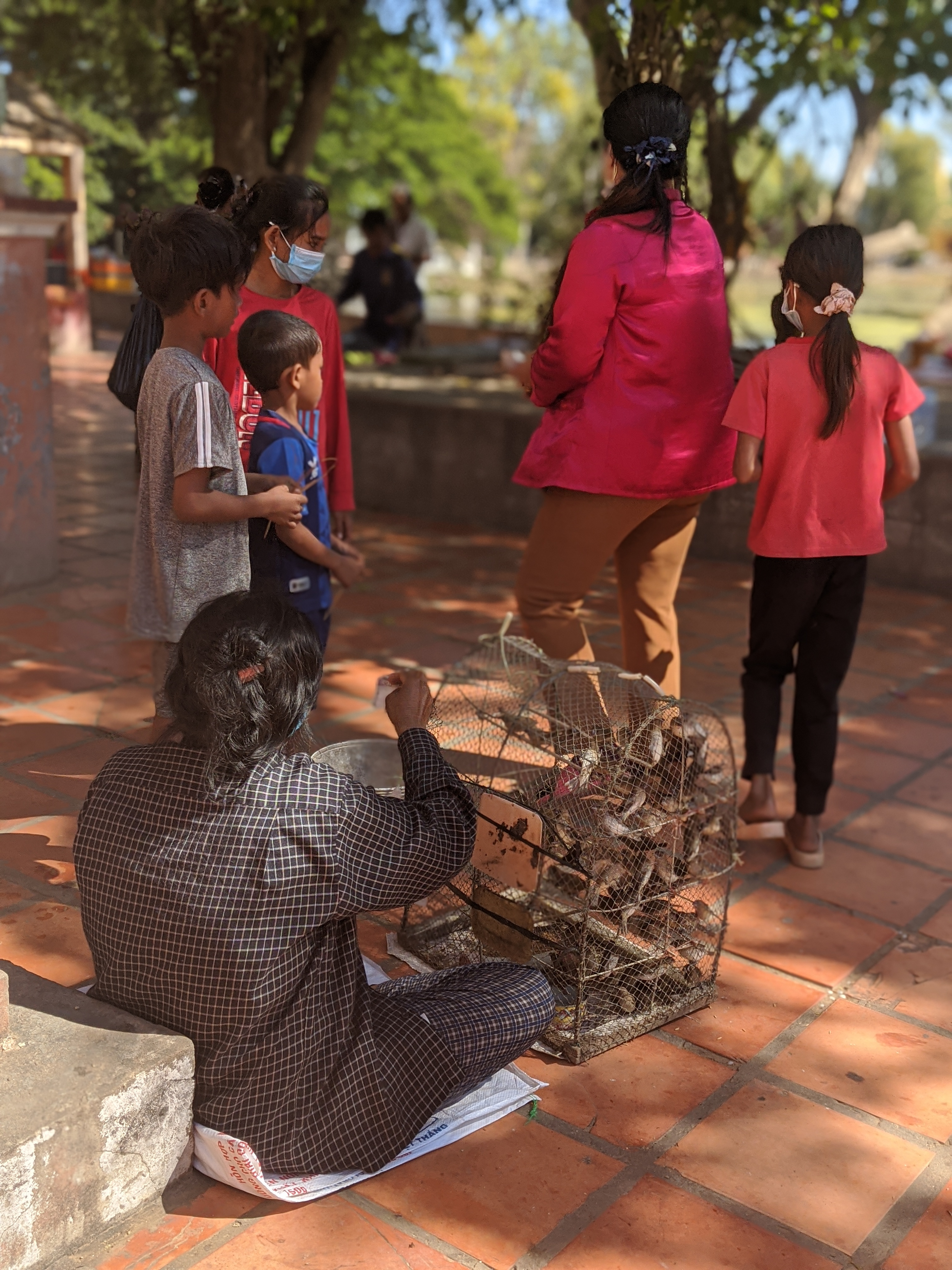
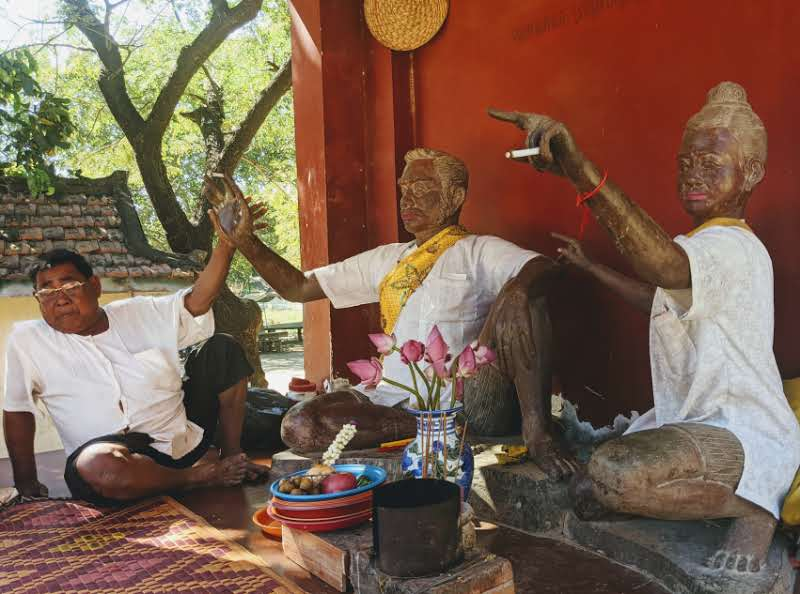
Cult of the neak ta through libations of the devotees and divination of the medium.

Wat Vihear Suor is a high place of Khmer spirituality where the most deeply-rooted pre-Buddhist chthonic cults mingle with the chanting of Buddhist monks.

=== The cult of the neak ta ===
Because of its strategic position close to Phnom Penh, on the way to Ba Phnom and territories under Cham influence, Vihear Suor has been regarded as a sacred place for the protection the capital of Phnom Penh and individual life, both in the belief of Buddhism and in the local spirit belief of neak ta.

The neak ta of Wat Vihear Suor were offered animal sacrifices until quite recently. In the 1950s, neak ta Mno of Wat Vihear Suor received both a crocodile and a monkey as a sacrificial offering.

The cult of Preah Ang Thom at Vat Vihear Suor, in which the Buddha statue is said to harbor the spirit of Norodom Sihanouk, provides a nice example of spirit possession associated with the statue worship in contemporary Cambodia. The mediums or baromey of who sit at the foot the statue of Preah Ang Thom claim to impersonate an intended person, often deceased, as a means of bringing them home.

The local achar attribute retributive power to the Buddha at Preah Vihear Suor in case proper offerings are not made.

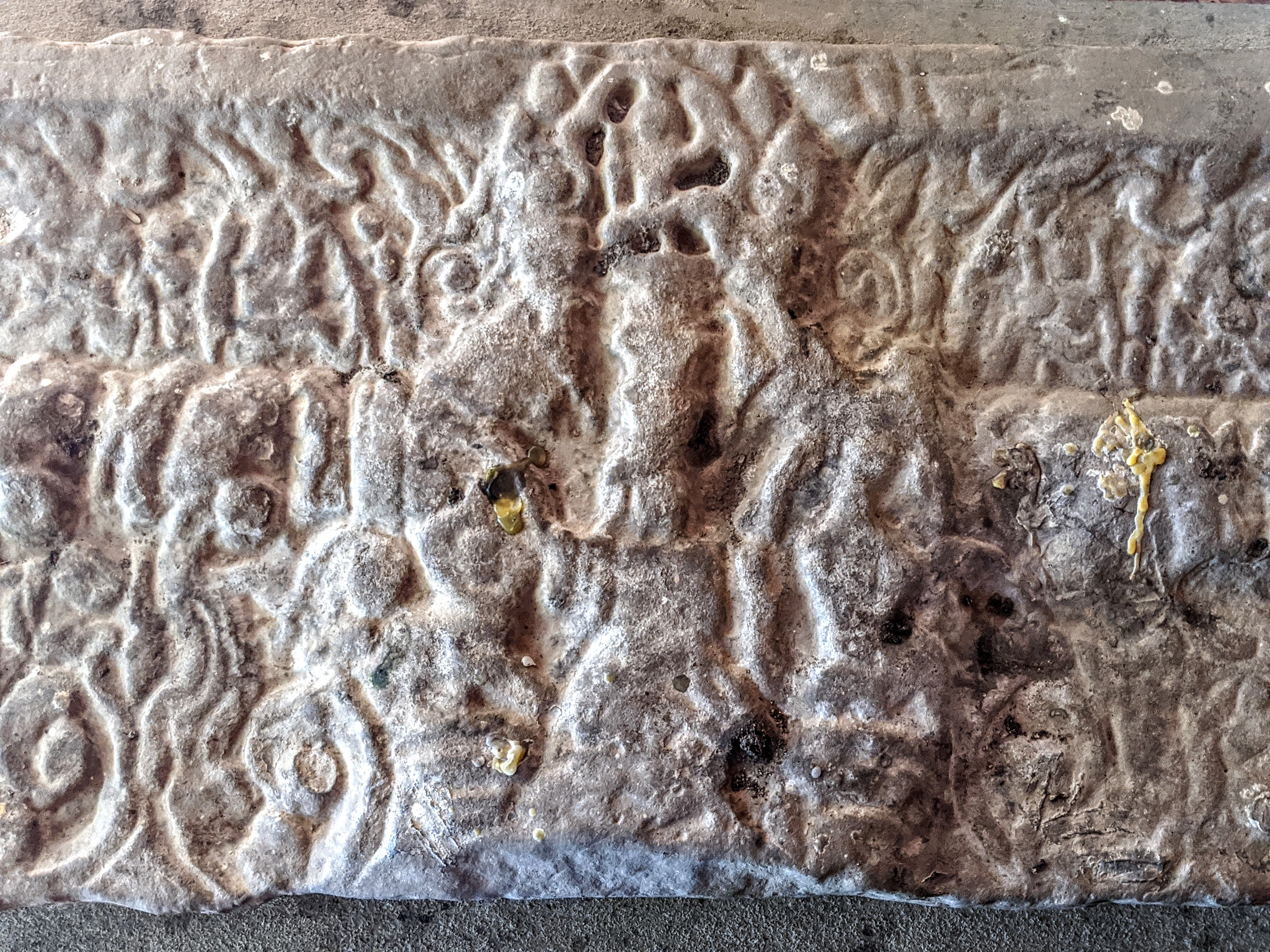
An Angkorian sandstone lintel has been integrated to the shrine of one of the neak ta.

An ancient sandstone lintel and other fragments put them in the shelter of the neak ta have become part of the spiritual belief of the local people.

=== A rare fertility deity in Cambodia ===
As a rather exceptional manifestation of a baromey fertility deity in Cambodia, a termite mound and a stupa are believed to be able to grant the wishes of sterile women who wish to have children.

=== Buffalo race ===
Vihear Suor village is famed for its traditional buffalo races. During Pchum Ben, villagers stage this race to mark the end of the annual festival riding their buffaloes whose horns are draped with colorful clothes.

== Bibliography ==
- Thun, Theara (2020). "Wat Preah Vihear Sour : A Popular Pilgrimage Site outside Phnom Penh, Cambodia". open.library.ubc.ca. doi:10.14288/1.0394985.
