= Baksei Chamkrong =

- Legendary King of the Khmer Empire
- Reign: AD 1028-1071
- Predecessor: King Sinhap Amrin
- Successor: King Alsareach or King Botum Vorvong
- Born: AD 1001; Kampong Preah Chin (Kampong Chen, Stong district, Kampong Thom today)
- Died: AD 1071; Angkor Wat
- Burial: Prasat Baksei Chamkrong
- Spouse: Princess Pov Pisey
- House: Cambodian Royal Chronicles
- Father: Ponhea Pich
- Mother: Neak Mneang Tep or Neak Mneang Keo

Baksei Chamkrong (also spelled Baksey Chamkrong, Khmer: បក្សីចាំក្រុង) is a legendary monarch of Cambodia, whose life and rule are known from the Cambodian Royal Chronicles. Despite a lack of historicity, the narrative of his epic has had a lasting influence on Cambodian culture and politics.

== Etymology ==
According to linguist Saveros Pou, the old Khmer meaning of the root krong is kept in the name of Baksei Cham Krong, meaning the King watched over by a bird, while in modern Khmer, krong means city, town, or country.

== Legend ==
The legend of Baksey Chamkrong, which originated in Wat Vihear Suor, is told in the Cambodian Royal Chronicles, and it is presented here in the version published by Mak Phoeun in 1984. The legend was enriched in 1998 by further study of the Chronicles and connection with Khmer folklore by Ros Chantrabot in his book on Khmer history.

=== Auspicious sign of a being-of-merit ===
In 1552 of the Buddhist era, or CE 1008, Prom Kel aged 12, ascended the throne following Dombâng Krânhoung. The new king ordered the astrologer to predict the future for him: “I have merits. Will there be another man of merit who will come to take my throne? The astrologer prostrated himself and predicted to him: “The Being-of-merits is already born in the royal family. He is 7 years old and fled in the form of a child of the people in a region outside the capital of this kingdom. He will come, and may take the throne. This 'Being-of-merits' has the sign of the wheel on the palms of the hands and the soles of the feet. Having heard this, the sovereign was very concerned. He ordered the mandarins and royal servants to inquire, but they got nothing definite. The young king ordered to take flour and spread it, then to bring all the 7-year-old children who lived in the august kingdom.

=== Identifying the promised child ===
The governors of the provinces sent them all without exception. Upon arrival, they were asked to put the palms of their hands and the soles of their feet on flour, and if there was no trace of the sign of the wheel, they were released. Ta Kohé also took Baksei Cham Krong there with the other children. He let him in and took the palms of his grandson's hands to put them on the flour. When the hands were withdrawn, the traces of the sign of the wheel were clearly found there. While the men were arguing, making a mess to look at the traces on the flour, Ta Kohé, sensing the danger, grabbed Baksei Cham Krong, carried him in his arms and fled.

=== Flight of Ta Kohé ===
Ta Kohé was able to get out, because the tumult was great, and the guards could not stop them. They brought this matter to the attention of His Majesty who ordered the troops to be raised to pursue and arrest Baksei Cham Krong. Ta Kohé went to tell his wife what had happened in all respects, then asked her to prepare food. Then he went to take back Baksei Cham Krong; and carrying him in his arms, he fled through the forests. In the morning, they left their place of rest, and arriving on the edge of the river, they did not find a boat to cross to the other bank. Seeing a large rokar tree standing on their bank, and a large koila tree on the other bank, Baksei Cham Krong said, "If I possess merits (Mean Boun) and really must ascend the throne, may this rokar tree bend forward, so that the koila tree bends to meet it”. The two trees then bowed to meet each other according to the invocation. They crossed the river and managed to reach the eastern bank. This is how there have been, since then and up to the present day, villages nearby called Roka Kong and Lovea Té.

=== Ascension to the throne ===
King Prom Kel reigned 20 years and died at the age of 31. The dignitaries and all the mandarins, having learned that Baksei Cham Krong possessed miraculous merits, met and agreed to go and invite Baksei Cham Krong to leave the Phnom Prasiddh region, and then invited him to ascend to the throne.

== Interpretation ==
=== A political myth ===
In 1951, historian Lawrence Palmer Briggs published The Ancient Khmer Empire, which was the first book to be assembled, compiled, and available in the English language about the Angkor Empire. She tried to identify Baksei Chamkrong with Suryavarman's son, who presumably ruled from 1028 A.D. to 1070 A.D. and married Preah Neang Poeu Pisei. This claim has not been accepted by other historians as it contains historical inconsistencies and confusions of different literary genres; Khmer inscriptions and royal chronicles.

Today, it is widely accepted that the legend of Baksey Cham Krong is a legend composed in the 18th century by the rulers in Oudong to support their territorial claims to the land of Cambodia. It is an antithesis of the myths related to the separation of the Kingdom of Sukhotai led by Bang Klang Hao assisted by a local ally, Pho Khun Pha Mueang.

According to Jacques Népote, the bird narrative may have been the symbol of a political myth to encourage soldiers among the "gang of birds" to practise the warrior cult vowed to Ta Moen Ek, similar to that of neak ta Khleang Moeung.

=== An etiological archeology: Prasat Baksey Chamkrong ===
There is to the north of Angkor, that is to say, symbolically on the side of "death", a small strange and ruined temple, called the Prasat Baksey Cham Krong. The complex is located about 150 meters north of Phnom Ba Kheng. The construction was ordered by King Harshavarman ( AD 910-944 ) and completed by King Rajendravarman, at dates which do not match the legend of Baksey Chamkrong.

The Prasat had a certain predisposition to receiving this new legend as it already kept the record of another legend of origin with its own inscription of the 10th century, which Georges Coedes had described as a summary of the history of Cambodia from its origin until the reign of king Rajendravarman: according to this inscription, an ascetic named Kambu received in marriage an Apsara named Mera, with the blessing of Siva.

== Popularity ==
=== Toponymy ===
In his flight, Baksey Chamkrong is said to have found refuge in Phnom Santuk and to have built various monasteries, among which Wat Vihear Suor in Ksach Kandal of the Province of Kandal.

The place were Baksey Chamkrong in his epic flight crossed the river thanks to the roka and the lovea tree is up to the present day, in villages called Roka Kong and Lovea Té.

It is popularly believed that a secret tunnel leads from Oudong to a grotto on nearby Phnom Baset that had supposedly been consecrated to Buddhism by the legendary king Baksei Chamkrong, though this is inconsistent historically as Buddhism was not yet state religion in Cambodia at the time when the legend supposedly occurred.

Since the renaming of all the streets of Phnom Penh during the Sangkum era after the French protectorate of Cambodia, many streets were given names related to Khmer heroes and legends. Street 94 in Phnom Penh was named in honour of Baksei Cham Krong.

=== Literature: a Khmer peplum ===
Director Biv Chhay Leang, was a Khmer novelist, and his films are typically based on his books. In the 1950s, he wrote a novel based on the epic of Baksey Cham Krong which he later adapted as a movie as a Khmer peplum.

=== Music: a rock band ===
Baksey Cham Krong was chosen as name by a rock band active in pre-Khmer Rouge Cambodia. They are regarded as Cambodia's first guitar band or first soft rock band.

=== Sports ===
Baksey Cham Krong F.C. is the name of a football club in Cambodia. It plays in the Cambodian League, the top division of Cambodian football.
