= Ten-satang coin =

Ten satang
- Thailand
- Value: 0.10 Thai baht
- Mass: 0.8 g
- Diameter: 17.5 mm
- Edge: Plain
- Composition: Aluminium; 99% Al
- Years of minting: 1908–Present
- Catalog number: -

Obverse
- Design: King Vajiralongkorn
- Designer: Vudhichai Seangern
- Design date: 2018

Reverse
- Design: Royal Monogram of King Vajiralongkorn
- Designer: Chaiyod Soontrapa
- Design date: 2018

The Thailand ten-satang coin (10 st. or 10 สต.) is a currency unit equivalent to one-tenth of a Thai baht. It is rare in circulation but used in banking transactions.

Evolution of 10 satang

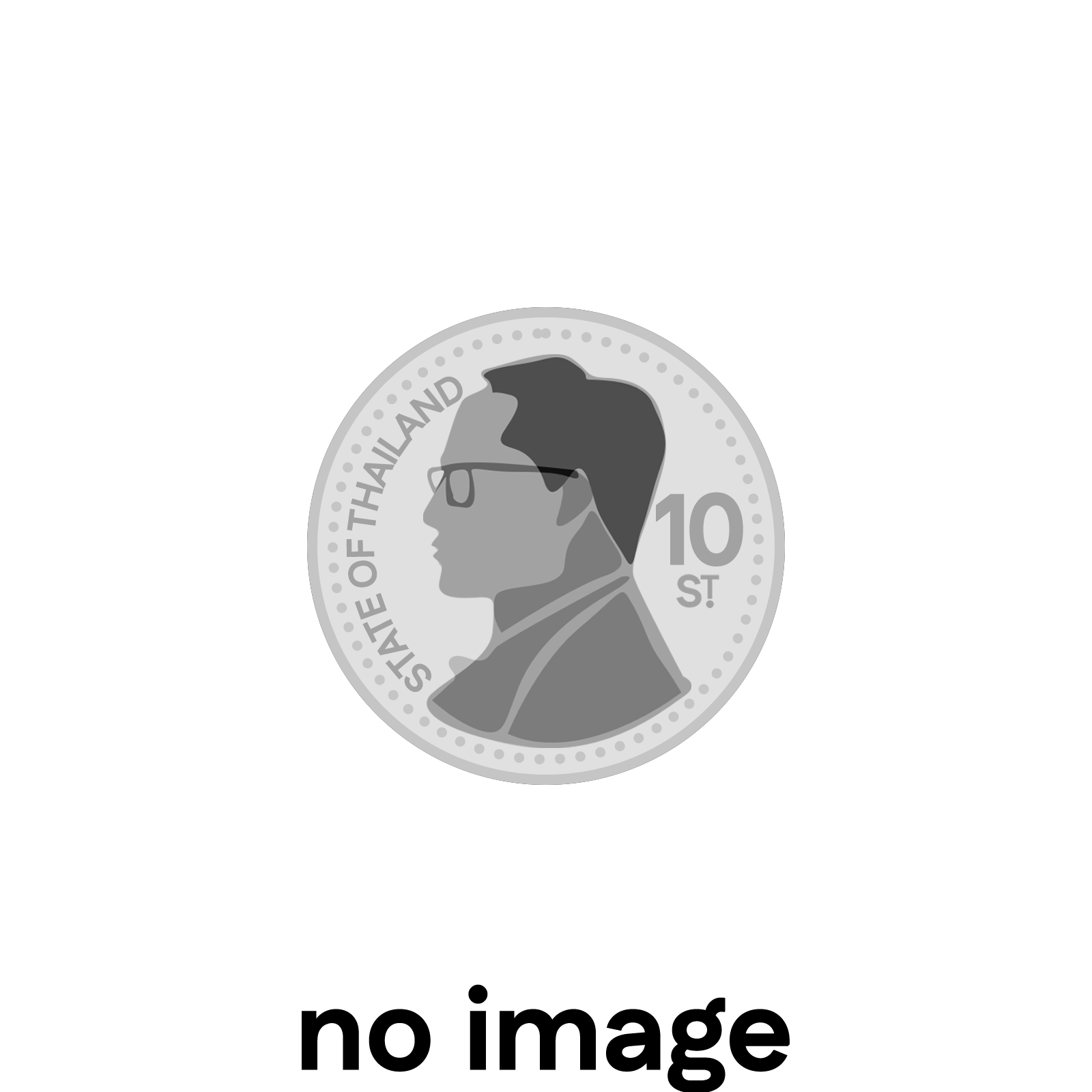
1987

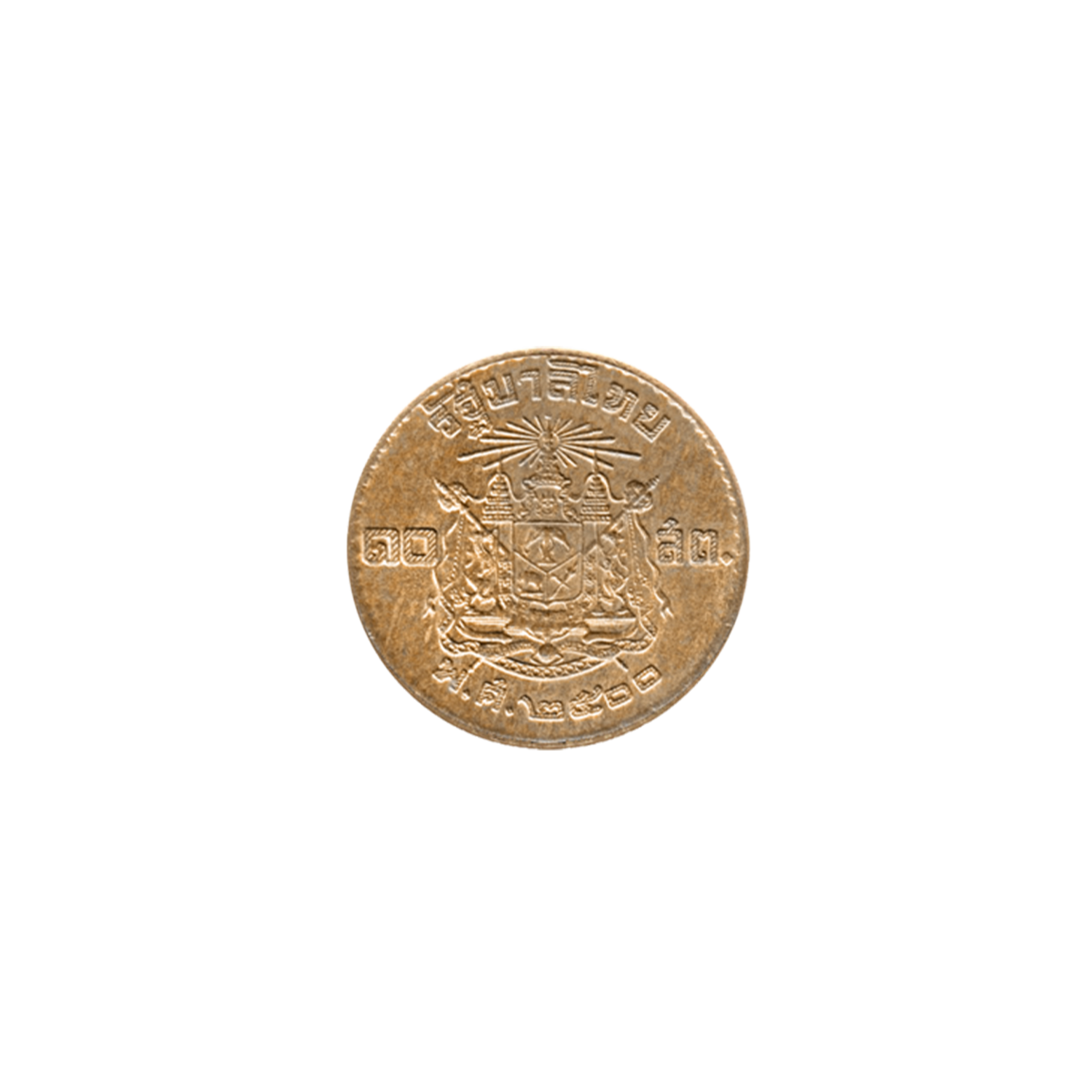
1950

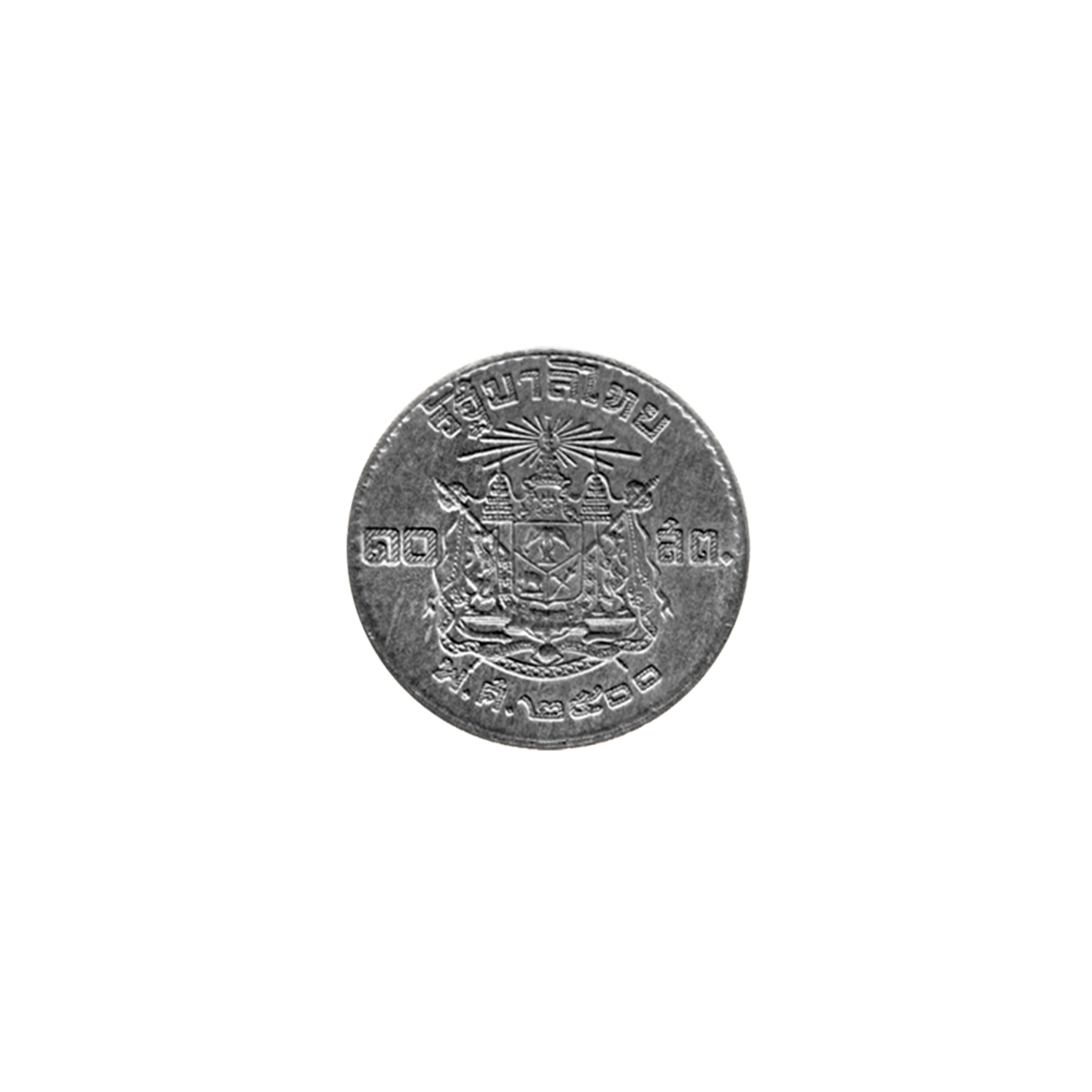
1950

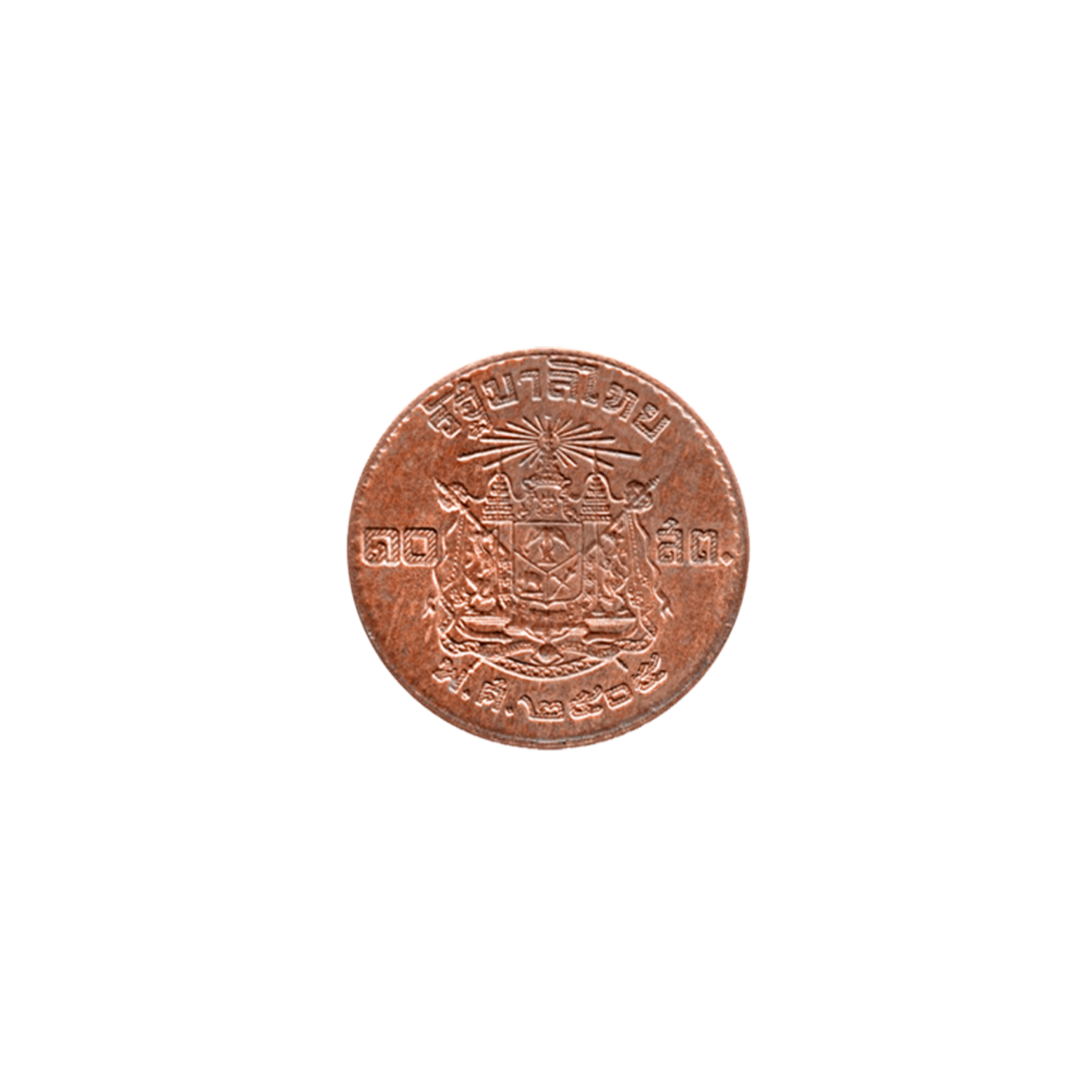
1950

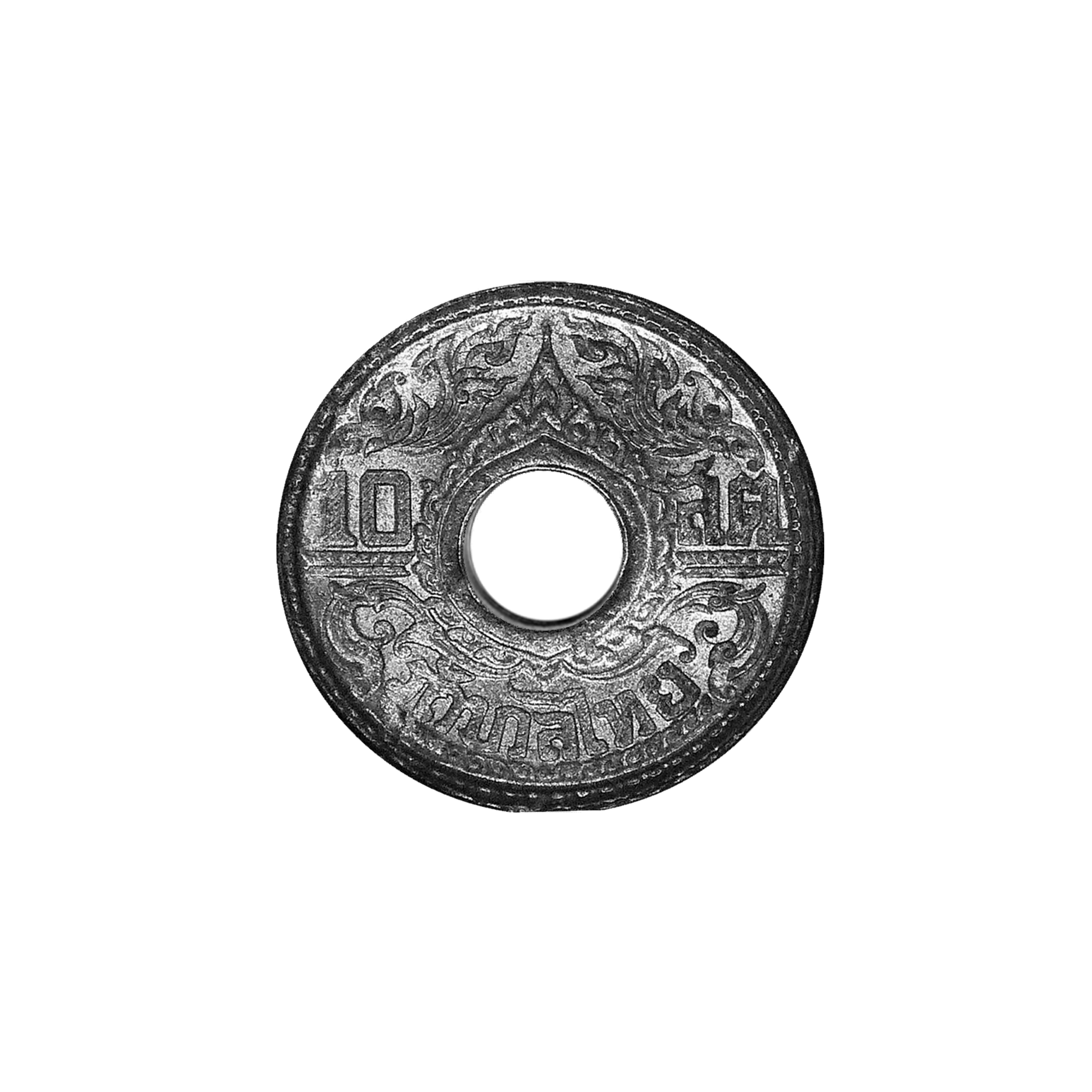
1944

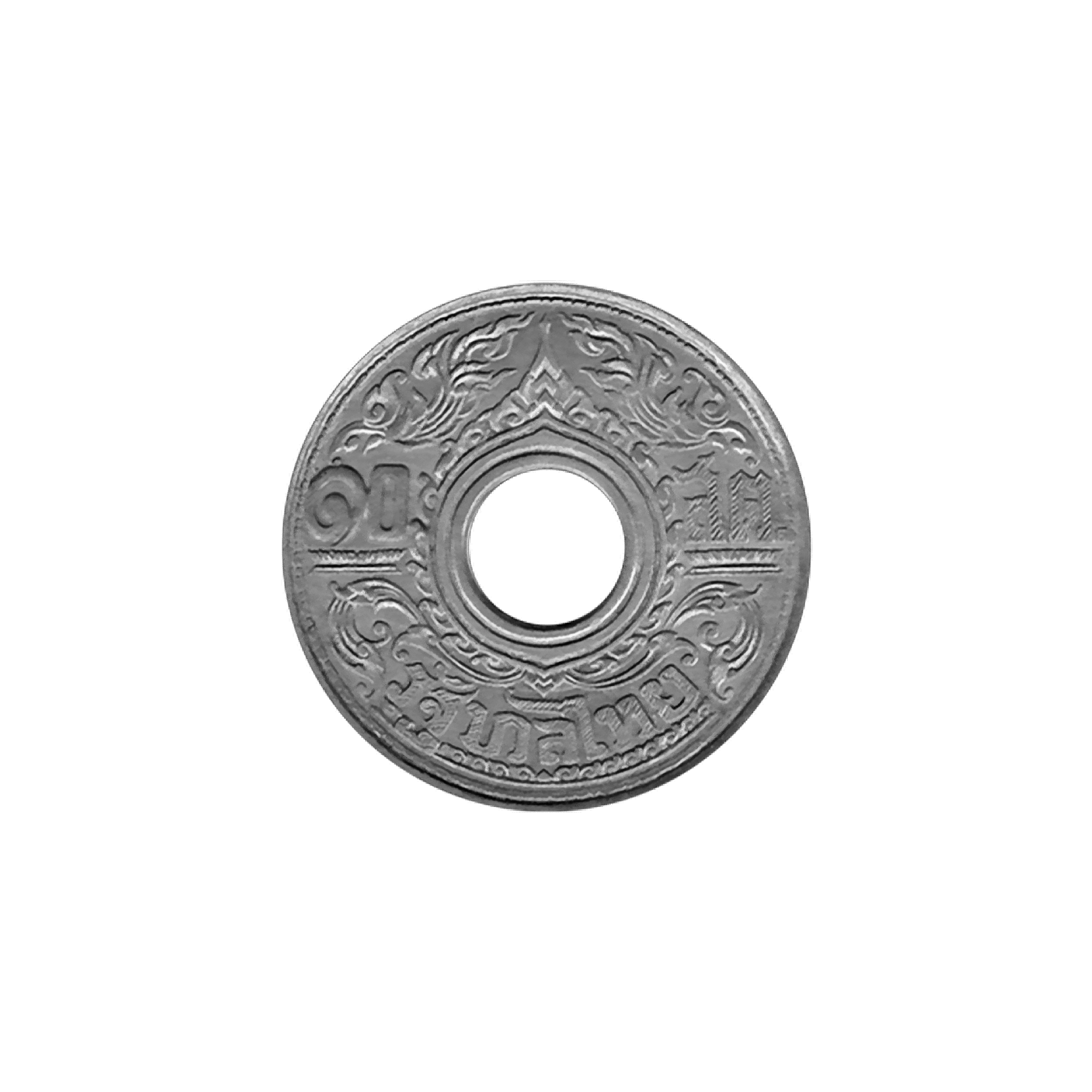
1941

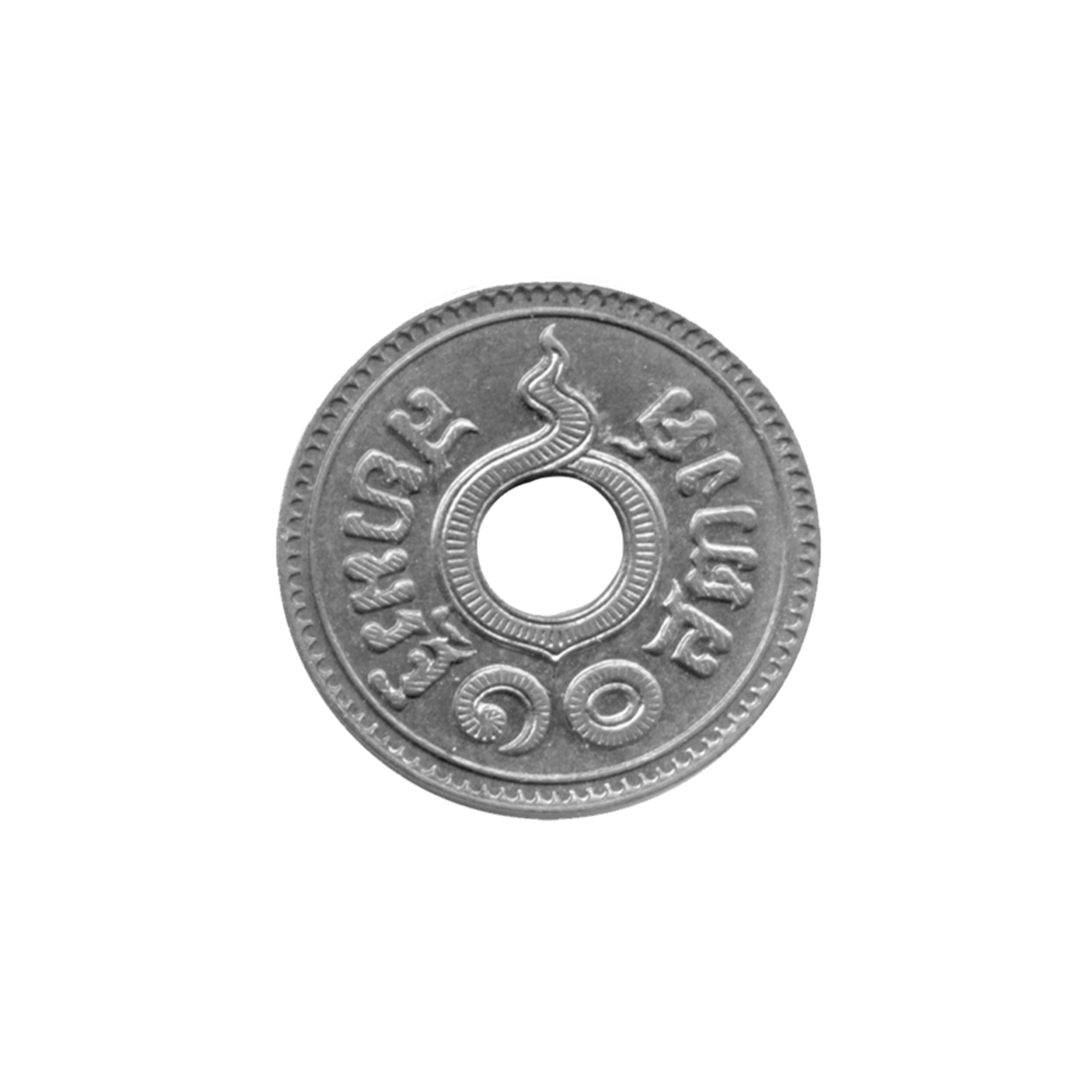
1908

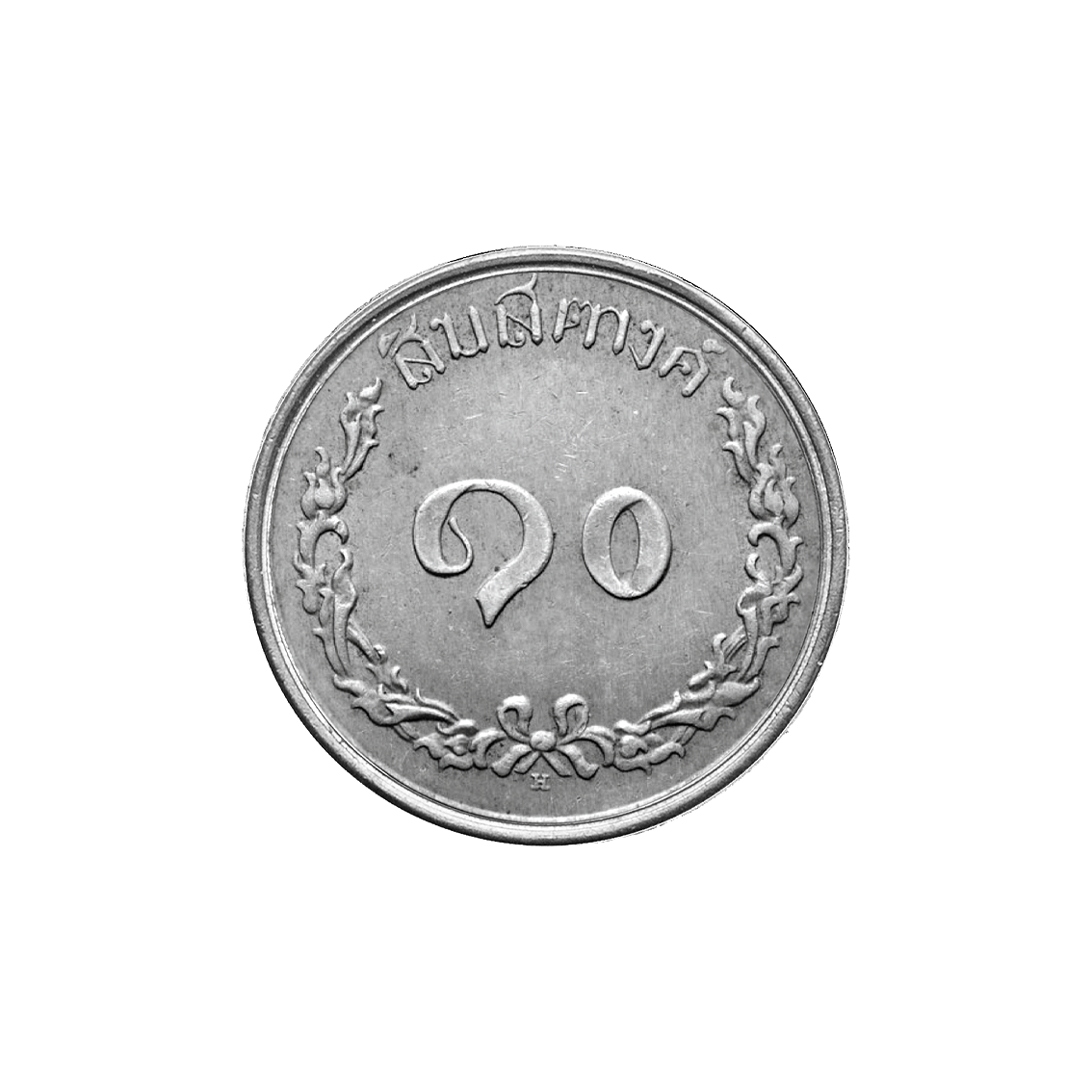
1897

== Mintages ==
- 1987 ~ 5,000
- 1988 ~ 895,000
- 1989 ~ 80,000
- 1990 ~ 100,050
- 1991 ~ 25,000
- 1992 ~ 61,000
- 1993 ~ 100,000
- 1994 ~ 500,000
- 1995 ~ 500,000
- 1996 - 0
- 1997 ~ 10,000
- 1998 ~ 10,000
- 1999 ~ 20,000
- 2000 ~ 10,000
- 2001 ~ 50,000
- 2002 - 0
- 2003 ~ 10,000
- 2004 ~ 10,000
- 2005 ~ 20,000
- 2006 ~ 3,000
- 2007 ~ 10,000
- 2008 ~ 10,000
- 2009 ~ 10,000

== 1908–1939 coin ==
A historical version of the coin was introduced in 1908 as a coin with a hole through its middle and minted until 1939.
