= Narainsamy Temple =

Hindu temple in KwaZulu-Natal, South Africa

Coordinates: 29.7762°S 30.9669°E

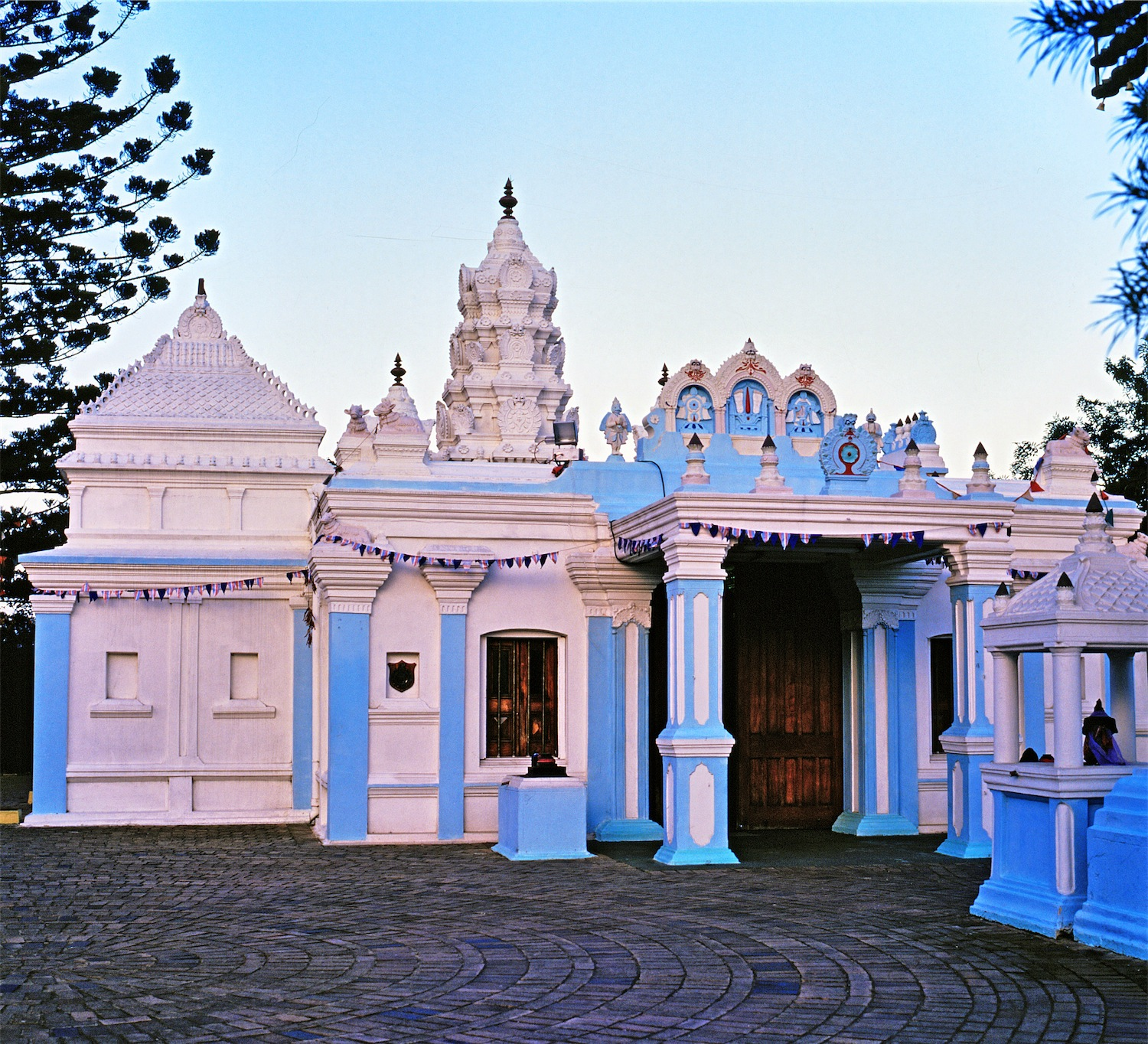
Narainsamy Temple

The Narainsamy Temple is a provincial heritage site in Inanda (eThekwini Metropolitan Municipality) in the KwaZulu-Natal province of South Africa. It was founded by Narainsamy in 1896, and is now controlled by a family trust that he created. Most of the congregation are Tamil Hindus.

== Architecture and appearance ==
Located on a ridge north of the Umgeni River near Durban, the temple's prominent white spire is visible from some distance away. The building is white, unlike many other similar buildings which are decorated in various colours. The temple has a simple classical pedestal, with a steeple and domes decorated with stucco modelling and elaborate detail. Above the frieze are two more storeys of diminishing size, dominated by mandala motifs on the four sides and corners. Above the main entrance is a decorative feature made up of three arched panels which form a short parapet to the flat roof of the hall. On the left hand side of the porch, to the south of the main hall, is a statue of a vole, and to the right of the porch is a statue of a peacock. At the northern end of the main hall (mandabulum) are three image cells of Narainsamy, Ganesta and Surbahmanya. In the west wall is an opening leading into a large cell (Nataraja). To the right of the main entrance of the mandabulum is a small raised platform, about 18 inches high, for ablutions. The interior of the temple is also painted white. On the walls are highly coloured lithographs depicting the Hindu pantheon.
