= Mount Edgecombe Ganesha Temple =

South African heritage site

The Mount Edgecombe Ganesha Temple is a provincial heritage site in Inanda (eThekwini Metropolitan Municipality) in the KwaZulu-Natal province of South Africa.

In 1977, it was described in the Government Gazette as

Heavily modulated perimeter wall. Entrance portal surmounted by SIKHALA tower. Cella on axis, square...This Hindu temple is the first building by the well-known architect and builder, Kristappa Reddy. The building was erected in 1899 and forms a unique part of South Africa's cultural and architectural heritage.
