= Phra That Dum =

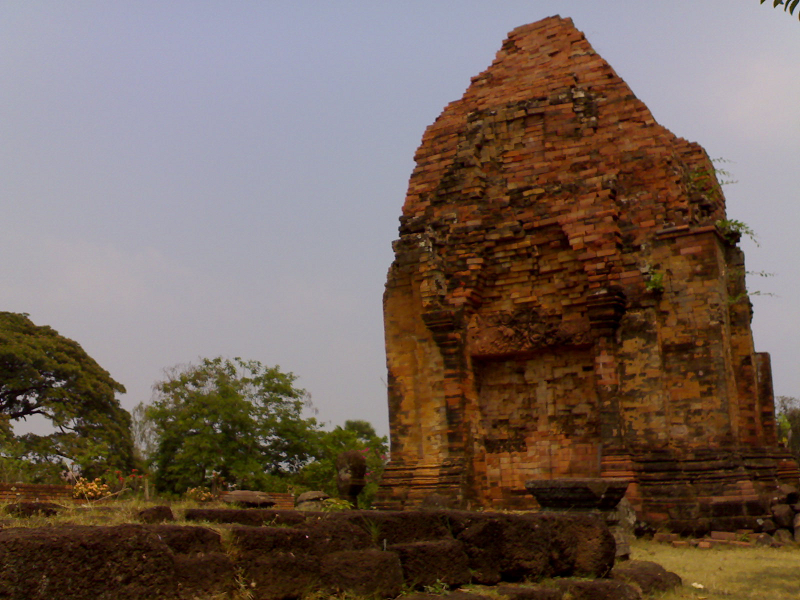

- Location in Thailand

Religion
- Affiliation: Hinduism
- Province: Sakon Nakhon

Location
- Country: Thailand
- Interactive map of Phra That Dum
- Coordinates: 17.143917°N 104.16415°E

Architecture
- Type: Khmer
- Completed: 16th Buddhist Century

Phra That Dum (Thai:พระธาตุดุม) is located at Tambon Ngew Don Sakon Nakhon Province, 3 kilometres from town on the way to Phatthana Suksa School. There were originally 3 brick Khmer pagodas on the same laterite base but only one stands today. The pagodas were built in the 16th Buddhist Century.

Phra That Dum is the lone Stupa is built with laterite in the same period as Phra That Narai Cheng Weng, but the stupa is smaller without base. The lintel featuring God Vishnu in reclining position is placed on the northern arch. Furthermore, there are carving regarding gods riding different animals over the Rahu.
