= Madhya Kailash Temple, Midrand =

Hindu temple in Midrand, South Africa

Madhya Kailash Temple

- Location within Gauteng

Religion
- Affiliation: Hinduism

Location
- Location: Midrand
- State: Gauteng
- Country: South Africa
- Interactive map of Madhya Kailash Temple
- Coordinates: 26°1′0.6″S 28°7′57″E

Website
- www.midrandtemple.org

Madhya Kailash Lord Shiva

The Madhya Kailash Temple (Tamil: மத்திய கைலாசம்) is a Hindu temple in Midrand, South Africa. The temple is dedicated to Lord Shiva who is the formless, timeless and spaceless Supreme God in Shaivism, one of the major branches of Hinduism. The resident priest of the temple is Guru Nadarajah Sarma. It was built recently due to the increasing of the Hindu community in the area.

The temple serves many devotees in the province of Gauteng and all South Africans. The temple has been a true example of Auvayar's saying 'Thirai Kadal Odiyum, thiravyam thedu' and is serving hundred of thousands of devotees who follow our rituals and our ceremonies. The temple has been a complete powerhouse uniting all devotees under one roof. There are many prayers and cultural events that take place on a regular basis which is open to all public to take part in and get the blessings of the almighty. Guru Nadarajah has been a pioneer and has served South Africa for over 25 years. Coming from the most Orthodox and religious family, Guru Nadarajah provides religious guidance and performs all the prayers as per the Agama Sastras.

The temple observes numerous religious functions throughout the year and hosts a number of cultural activities such as Bharatanatyam and percussion classes on a weekly basis.
