= Lovea =

Cambodian archaeological site

- Location in Cambodia
- 13.484°N 103.713°E
- Location: Cambodia

Lovea is a modern village and archaeological site located in the Puok district of Siem Reap province, Cambodia. Lovea's circular mound measures 210 metres (690 ft) north–south, and 312 metres (1,024 ft) east-west, and is notable for its two circular embankments or moats that surround the mound, an unusual habitation pattern in this part of Cambodia. The site was first identified and described by French archaeologist Louis Malleret in the 1950s. More recent archaeological excavations have identified burials and residential occupation. The site dates from the second century BCE through the Angkor period to the present day.

== Landscape ==
Lovea is located where the gently sloping alluvial fan of the Puok river meets the edge of the Tonle Sap Lake floodplain. The landscape surrounding the Lovea site contains numerous features including:

- A large rectangular feature (2,354 m × 1,210 m [7,723 ft × 3,970 ft]) directly to the south that appears to be a now dry baray or reservoir likely dating to the Angkorian or Post-Angkorian Middle Period.
- One small Angkorian-period temples abuts the NE portion of the rectangular feature and another lies just to the west of the feature.
- An Angkorian temple site known as Banteay Sra and associated water storage feature (trapeang) are southwest of Lovea

=== Radial pattern ===
Lovea is part of a series of prehistoric mounds located northwest of the civic-ceremonial center of Angkor that have "oxcart tracks and ricefields radiating from the central mound." These tracks not only facilitate integration into a transport and communication network as oxcarts tracks link several mounds in the area, but also help to move water away from the central mound.

== History of research and excavation ==
=== Louis Malleret ===
Louis Malleret reported identifying the circular mound and embankments of Lovea following photographs provided by Jean Laur, then Conservator of Monuments at Angkor. When Malleret visited the site, the local inhabitants recorded that approximately 70 years earlier excavations around the site had uncovered burials with bronze and iron artifacts. This prompted Malleret to excavate small test pits, but no similar artifacts or bones were recovered.

==== The village post ====
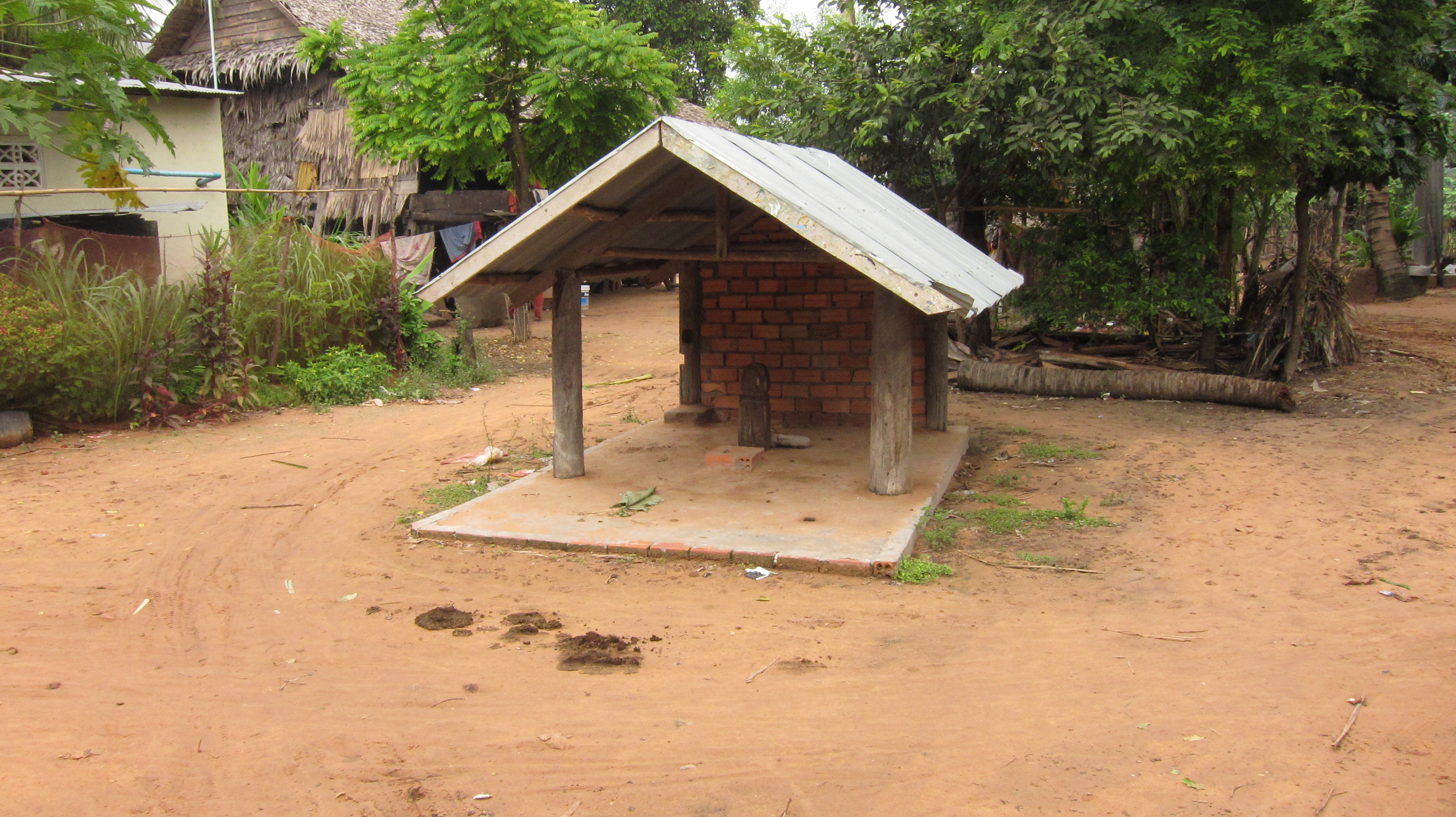
Center post in the village of Lovea.

While visiting Lovea, Malleret reported the presence of a small wooden post housed under a small roof that marked the center of the village. He noted that village inhabitants undertook annual celebrations of the post, which was associated with a village spirit.

=== From Paddy to Pura: The Origins of Angkor ===
Archaeological research was more recently undertaken as part of the Paddy to Pura: The Origins of Angkor joint project involving researchers from Australia led by Dougald O'Reilly and Louise Shewan and funded by the Australian Research Council and the Authority for the Protection and Management of Angkor and the Region of Siem Reap (APSARA Authority). Excavations were undertaken on the mound and embankments in 2011-2 and 2013. A LiDAR survey of the area was also undertaken in 2012.

==== 2011-2012 season ====
The first field season consisted of an 8x8m excavation unit (Unit 1) in an open area located near the center of the mound. The aims of the first season were to verify earlier reports of burials and occupation at the site as well as confirm dates for occupation and use of the site. Multiple burials were identified during these excavations.

==== 2012 LiDAR survey ====
The Lovea mound and nearby area were surveyed as part of a broader LiDAR survey project by the Khmer Archaeology LiDAR Consortium (KALC). The LiDAR data confirmed the circular mound and presence of outer embankment and interior depression interpreted as a moat, as well as borrow pits on the exterior of the outer embankment. The interior embankment and ditch was difficult to identify, but portions were visible on the eastern and western sides of the mound. LiDAR also confirmed the earlier identified radial features and modification of the mound during the Pre-Angkor or Angkorian periods.

==== 2013 season ====
Additional units on the mound and embankments were excavated during the 2013 field season. A second 3x8m unit (Unit 2) was opened on the mound near Unit 1, and identified Angkorian sherds and a burial with partial skeletal remains below this layer. Excavation trenches also were placed on the embankments to better understand their construction and function. Unit 3 (12x1.5m) was located on the eastern side of the inner embankment. Units 4-7 bisected a portion on the eastern side of the outer embankment and the low-lying area next to the embankment.

== Dates ==
Until archaeological work by the Paddy to Pura project, the exact age of Lovea was unknown. Reports of human remains with metal by Malleret pointed towards prehistoric origins. In 1989, the archaeologist Elizabeth Moore also noted similarities between Lovea and the moated sites of Northeast Thailand, proposing that it pre-dated nearby Angkorian period rectilinear features and may date to the early first millennium BCE. However, work by the Paddy to Pura Project suggests this date is too early.

Thirteen samples were radiocarbon dated from Unit 1 excavations of the Paddy to Pura project. Two dates associated with burial contexts fall within the second century CE and as the burials are directly on top of natural soil, the excavators have proposed that the site was uninhabited prior to this date. Later modifications were apparently made to the mound during the Pre-Angkorian (6-8th centuries CE) and Angkorian periods, including the construction of small mounds and ponds inside the embankments and the modification of the central mound into a more rectangular shape. The identification of Angkorian stoneware sherds and Chinese porcelain tradewares also suggests that habitation at the mound continued into the Angkorian period.

A study of the rice field patterns surrounding Lovea by Scott Hawken supports the dates from excavations. Radial patterns in ox carts and rice fields correspond with Lovea's prehistoric/Iron Age dates. Additionally, parts of the landscape have been modified with a large canal and orthogonally arranged rice fields, which Hawken suggests is related to expansion of the site during the Angkorian period, likely around the tenth century CE. A large, now dry, water storage tank also borders the southern embankment of Lovea and may date to the Early Modern period (15-17th centuries CE). In all, it seems that Lovea was inhabited from the second century CE until the present.

== Burials ==
Excavations by the Paddy to Pura project in 2012 and 2013 identified 14 individuals in 12 burials. Most individuals were buried in the extended position with their heads pointing south or south-southeast. In general, the burials had poor preservation and several were inter-mingled with one another having been disturbed in prehistory.

=== Burial 1 ===
Burial 1 consisted the poorly preserved skeletal remains of an adult and contained 20 artifacts including: bronze bangles and fragments, glass beads, two carnelian beads, iron objects, 3 ceramic vessels, and 2 objects that may have been burnishing stones.

=== Burial 2 ===
Burial 2 consisted of a mix of poorly preserved skeletal elements that may have been disturbed in prehistory. Grave goods included glass beads, bronze and iron objects, one ceramic vessel, and 2 clay pellets.

=== Burial 3 ===
Burial 3 consists of an adult male human skull located near Burial 2 and found with glass beads, bronze and iron objects, a spindle whorl, and clay pellets. The remainder of the Burial 3 skeleton may lie west of Burial 3.2.

=== Burial 3.1 ===
Burial 3.1 is a skull of an adult, with no additional post-cranial remains or grave goods.

=== Burial 3.2 ===
Burial 3.2 contains the skeleton of a young adult male and is nearly complete. Burials 2, 3 and 3.1 may have been disturbed during the burial of this individual. Grave goods include iron and bronze objects, ceramics, clay pellets, and glass beads. Based on the grave goods, Burial 3.2 is considered to be amongst the richest at the site, containing approximately 25% of the wealth at the site.

=== Burial 4 ===
Burial 4 contains poorly preserved remains of an individual that might be an adult. Grave goods include pottery, a clay pellet, bronze and iron objects, glass beads and agate and carnelian beads.

=== Burial 5 ===
Burial 5 consists of the fragmentary and poorly preserved remains of an adult or subadult individual. The only grave good found in association was an iron object.

=== Burial 6 ===
Burial 6 contained partial remains of an individual along with clay pellets, bronze and iron objects, glass, agate, and carnelian beads, and two ceramic pots.

=== Burial 7 ===
Burial 7 is a well-preserved adult burial that was only partially excavated from the pelvis to the cranium. Grave goods include bronze rings, agate and carnelian beads, glass beads, a marble bangle, bronze and iron objects, and a clay pellet.

=== Burial 8 ===
Burial 8 was poorly preserved, but determined to be an adult based on the little skeletal remains that were found. Grave goods included ceramics, a bronze earring, glass and stone beads, a grinding stone, and iron objects.

=== Burial 9 ===
Burial 9 represents the burial of an adult male, although skeletal remains were fragmentary. The burial included an iron objects, glass and stone beads, bronze bangles, and a fragmentary ceramic pot.

=== Burial 10 ===
Burial 10 likely represents an adult male, with glass beads, clay pellets, iron tools, a bronze bangle, grinding stone, and ceramics.

=== Burial 11 ===
Burial 11 was found under Burial 9 and was a poorly preserved adult skeleton. Grave goods included an iron knife, bronze ornaments, and glass beads.

=== 2013 Burial - Burial 12 ===
Fragments of a young adult skull were identified during the 2013 excavations in Unit 2.

== Artifacts ==
=== Metals ===
Copper-base rings, earrings, and bracelets were analyzed and found to be made of bronze, including leaded and high-tin bronzes. Analysis of lead isotope values suggest connections with the Sepon copper source in Laos.

=== Beads ===
Analysis of seven of the agate and carnelian beads from the site suggest that the raw material to produce the beads was compositionally analogous to geologic sources in the Deccan Traps, India. The beads also appear to have been perforated using a double-diamond drill, a drilling method consistent with South Asian production techniques.

Nearly all of the glass beads from Lovea were small, monochromatic beads, mostly in opaque orange or red, with smaller quantities in dark blue and yellow. The majority of the beads were made from a high-alumina mineral soda glass that were widely used and exchanged across South and Southeast Asia in the early-mid first millennium CE.

=== Ceramics ===
A study of ceramics found in burials at Lovea show that they were made using the paddle and anvil technique with most vessels either not being tempered or tempered with rice husks.

=== Other artifacts ===
Burial 11 contained a Chinese coin that is similar to those from the Xin Dynasty (9-23 CE). Other similar coins have been found in burials associated with the Sa Huynh culture in central Vietnam and a burial from the Thung Thôn site, Vietnam.

A marble bangle was found in Burial 7 with multiple drill holes showing that it had been repaired prior to burial. A similar bangle was identified at the site of Nong Nor, Thailand.

== Moats and embankments ==
Excavations of the embankments suggest that the natural soil was dug into to create the moat, and soil was then piled up to create the embankments. The outer embankment measures approximately 20m in width, with the moat between the inner and outer embankments measuring 15m wide. Sediments in the moat near the inner embankment demonstrate that it was filled with water and likely used for agriculture as seen at the site today. Excavations in the moat and outer embankment show evidence for siltation and in-filling. The excavators propose that the moats were used to hold water. It is not clear when these features were constructed, but similar moats in northeast Thailand date to the mid-late Iron Age period, in the first few centuries CE. Similarities between the moated sites in Northeast Thailand and Lovea have been noted by earlier scholars. O'Reilly and Shewan propose that these similarities "may be indicative of knowledge/technology transfer" between the two regions.
