= Phra That Narai Cheng Weng =

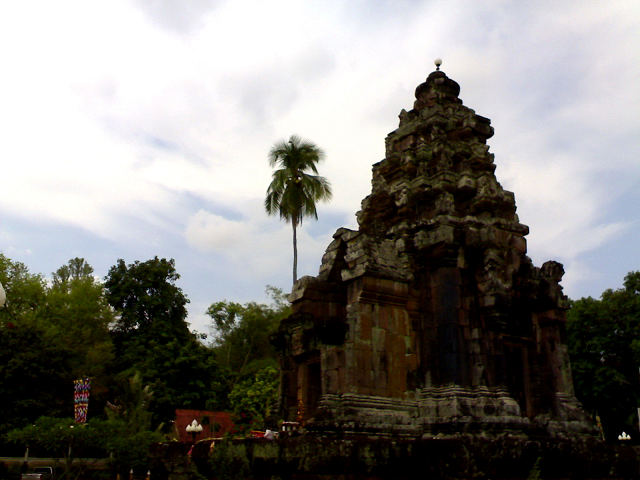

- Location in Thailand

Religion
- Affiliation: Hinduism
- Province: Sakon Nakhon

Location
- Country: Thailand
- Interactive map of Phra That Narai Cheng Weng
- Coordinates: 17.187074°N 104.095792°E

Architecture
- Type: Khmer
- Completed: 16th Buddhist Century

Phra That Narai Cheng Weng or Phra That Narai Jengveng (Thai:พระธาตุนารายณ์เจงเวง) - is located at Mueang Sakon Nakhon District, Sakon Nakhon Province, the stupa is built from sandstone on a laterite base and carved beautifully. Its lintel features Lord Krisna killing Lion in Bapuan Khmer art. The art appearing on this stupa is quite similar to many other Khmer ruins found in Isan.

This khmer sanctuary is 5 kilometres from town on the way to Sakon Nakhon. The sandstone pagoda is on a laterite base. Ornate designs adorn the lintel, doorway and windows. It is believed the site was entirely constructed by women who competed with the men who built Phra That Phu Pek. It dates from the 16th-17th Buddhist century.
