= List of Hindu temples in Australia =

This is a list of Hindu temples in Australia, arranged by state and territory. At the 2021 Australian census, 684,002 people, or 2.7 per cent of the population, reported Hinduism as their religion. Most temples are in the capital cities, particularly Sydney and Melbourne.

The list includes temples and permanent places of Hindu worship whose existence and location are documented in a published source. It does not include groups that meet only in hired halls, or temples still under construction.

== Australian Capital Territory ==
| Temple | Suburb or town | Tradition | Notes |
|---|---|---|---|
| BAPS Shri Swaminarayan Mandir | Taylor | BAPS | Opened in 2024. |
| Canberra Arupadai Murugan Temple | Torrens | Saiva, Murugan | |
| Canberra Sri Kalikambal Devasthanam | Wanniassa | Shakta, Saiva | |
| Hindu Temple and Cultural Centre | Florey | Sanatan | Foundation stone laid in 1993. |
| ISKCON Canberra | Hughes | ISKCON | |
| Sri Vishnu Shiva Mandir | Mawson | Sanatan | Temple and library. |

== New South Wales ==
| Temple | Suburb or town | Tradition | Notes |
|---|---|---|---|
| BAPS Shri Swaminarayan Mandir | Rosehill | BAPS | |
| BAPS Shri Swaminarayan Mandir | Cardiff, Newcastle | BAPS | |
| BAPS Shri Swaminarayan Mandir | Griffith | BAPS | Inaugurated in 2019. |
| ISKCON Sri Sri Radha Gopinatha Mandir | North Sydney | ISKCON | Deities installed in 1971. |
| Maharashtra Mandir Australia | Castle Hill | Maharashtrian Hindu | |
| Mukti Gupteshwar Mandir | Minto | Shaiva | Built in 1991. |
| New Gokula Farm, temple of Sri Sri Radha Gokulananda | Millfield | ISKCON | Temple building completed in 1990. Part of a farm community. |
| New Govardhana | Eungella | ISKCON | Temple within a farm community near Murwillumbah. |
| Ram Krishna Temple | Austral | Sanatan Dharm Sabha NSW | |
| Shree Jagannath Temple | Castle Hill | Jagannath, Odia | |
| Shree Shirdi Sai Sansthan | Regents Park | Sai | Opened in 2016. |
| Shree Swaminarayan Mandir Bhuj | Kings Park | Swaminarayan, Bhuj | |
| Shree Swaminarayan Mandir Sydney (ISSO) | Blacktown | Swaminarayan, ISSO | |
| Shri Sai Mandir | Strathfield South | Sai | |
| Shri Shiv Mandir | Minto | Sanatan Hindu | |
| Sri Karphaga Vinayakar Temple | Flemington | Ganesha, Tamil | Consecrated in 2006. |
| Sri Mandir | Auburn | Sanatan Hindu | Established in 1977. |
| Sri Venkateswara Temple | Helensburgh | Vaishnava | Functioning since 1985. |
| Sydney Durga Temple (Sri Durgadevi Devasthanam) | Regents Park | Shakta | Registered in 2002. |
| Sydney Murugan Temple | Mays Hill | Murugan, Saiva | |

== Queensland ==
| Temple | Suburb or town | Tradition | Notes |
|---|---|---|---|
| BAPS Shri Swaminarayan Mandir | Kingston | BAPS | |
| BAPS Shri Swaminarayan Mandir | Bungalow, Cairns | BAPS | Inaugurated in 2022. |
| BAPS Shri Swaminarayan Mandir | Glenview, Sunshine Coast | BAPS | Inaugurated in January 2025. |
| Gayatri Mandir | Boondall | Hindu Society of Queensland | SBS has described it as Brisbane's first Hindu temple. |
| Hare Krsna Temple | Burbank | Gaudiya Vaishnava | |
| Hindu Temple of Central Queensland | Koongal, Rockhampton | Sanatan Hindu | |
| ISKCON Brisbane | Seventeen Mile Rocks | ISKCON | |
| Om Shri Deveshwar Mahadev Shiva Mandir Brisbane | Newstead | Shaiva | |
| Shree Laxminarayan Mandir | Burbank | Sanatan Hindu | |
| Shree Vishnu Maya Mandir | North Maclean | Sanatan Hindu | |
| Sri Selva Vinayakar Temple | South Maclean | Ganesha, Tamil Hindu | Reopened after rebuilding in 2015. |

== South Australia ==
| Temple | Suburb or town | Tradition | Notes |
|---|---|---|---|
| Adelaide Shirdi Saibaba Temple | Waterloo Corner | Sai | |
| BAPS Shri Swaminarayan Mandir | Green Fields | BAPS Swaminarayan | Inaugurated in April 2015. |
| ISKCON Adelaide | Kilburn | ISKCON | |
| Shree Swaminarayan Temple Adelaide | Salisbury East | Swaminarayan, Bhuj | |
| Shree Vallabhdham Haveli | Salisbury North | Pushtimarg | Deity installed in 2011. |
| Shri Ganesha Hindu Temple | Oaklands Park | Ganesha, Hindu Society of South Australia | Set up in a former church in 1986 and rebuilt in 2001. |

== Tasmania ==
| Temple | Suburb or town | Tradition | Notes |
|---|---|---|---|
| BAPS Shri Swaminarayan Mandir | Claremont, Hobart | BAPS Swaminarayan | A former aged care centre converted into a mandir. |

== Victoria ==
| Temple | Suburb or town | Tradition | Notes |
|---|---|---|---|
| AUMSAI Sansthan Temple | Mordialloc | Sai | |
| BAPS Shri Swaminarayan Mandir | Mill Park | BAPS | |
| BAPS Shri Swaminarayan Mandir | Cranbourne South | BAPS | |
| Guruji Mandir | Hoppers Crossing | Guruji tradition | Damaged by an accidental electrical fire in January 2025. |
| Hare Krishna Valley | Bambra | ISKCON | Temple within a rural community. |
| ISKCON Melbourne | Albert Park | ISKCON | |
| Kali Mata Mandir | Craigieburn | Shakta | |
| Kundrathu Kumaran Temple | Deanside | Murugan | |
| Mata Chintapurni Mandir | St Albans | Shakta | Founded in 2011. Moved to St Albans in 2020. |
| Melbourne Murugan Temple | Sunshine North | Murugan, Saiva | Trust established in 1995. First stage of construction completed in 1999. |
| Prem Prakash Mandal Mandir | Epping | Prem Prakash | Opened in 2015. |
| Sankat Mochan Samiti Indian Cultural Centre | Oakleigh South | Hanuman | Formally opened in 2026. |
| Shirdi Sai Sansthan Melbourne | Camberwell | Sai | Founded in 2005. |
| Shree Swaminarayan Temple | Boronia | Swaminarayan | |
| Shree Swaminarayan Temple Junagadhdham Melbourne | Rockbank | Swaminarayan | Murti pratishtha held in January 2026. |
| Shree Swaminarayan Temple Melbourne (ISSO) | Derrimut | Swaminarayan, ISSO | Site bought in 2016. |
| Shreenathji Haveli | Hallam | Pushtimarg | Cultural centre opened in 2013. |
| Shri Shiva Vishnu Temple | Carrum Downs | Hindu Society of Victoria | |
| Sri Durga Temple | Rockbank | Shakta | Opened in 2015. |
| Sri Sai Siva Vishnu Temple | Truganina | Sanatan Hindu | |
| Sri Vakrathunda Vinayagar Temple | The Basin | Ganesha, Saiva | Established in 1989. SBS has described it as Victoria's oldest Hindu temple. |
| Sri Venkata Krishna Brundavana | Murrumbeena | Madhva, Vaishnava | Began as a priest house in Hampton Park in 2015. |
| Sri Vishnu Durga Hindu Temple | Epping | Vaishnava, Shakta | Founded in 2003. |

== Western Australia ==
| Temple | Suburb or town | Tradition | Notes |
|---|---|---|---|
| Bala Murugan Temple | Mandogalup | Murugan, Tamil | Founded in 1996 by the Saiva Maha Sabai of Western Australia. |
| BAPS Shri Swaminarayan Mandir | Wangara | BAPS | |
| ISKCON Perth, Sri Sri Gaura Nitai Temple | Kalamunda | ISKCON | |
| Jai Mata Durga Temple Perth | Kelmscott | Shakta | |
| Kali Mata Temple | Yangebup | Shakta | |
| Perth Shiva Temple (Perth Hindu Temple) | Canning Vale | Shaiva, Hindu Association of Western Australia | Its tower was consecrated in 2008. |
| Shakktidhaam | Wangara | Sanatan Hindu | |
| Shree Jalaram Sanatan Mandir | Gnangara | Jalaram, Sanatan | |
| Shree Swaminarayan Gadi Temple | Embleton | Swaminarayan, Maninagar | Housed in a former Kingdom Hall bought in 2018. |
| Shree Swaminarayan Hindu Temple | Bennett Springs | Swaminarayan | Opened in January 2013. |
| Shreenath Dham Haveli | Perth | Pushtimarg | First haveli inaugurated in May 2026. |

== See also ==
- Hinduism in Australia
- List of Hindu temples outside India
- List of Swaminarayan temples
