= Wijewardane =

Wijewardane is a surname. Notable people with the surname include:

- Aruni Wijewardane (fl. 1988), Sri Lankan diplomat
- Megha Wijewardane (born 2010), Australian ambassador for NASA
- Nissanka Wijewardane (1925-2019), Sri Lankan civil servant
