= Sri Lankan Australians =

- (Sri Lanka) (Australia)

Total population
- 172,800 (by birth, 2024) (0.2% of the Australian population); 131,905 (by ancestry, 2021)

Regions with significant populations
- Victoria: 82,493^{1}
- New South Wales: 31,073^{1}
- Queensland: 15,129^{1}
- Western Australia: 11,582^{1}
- South Australia: 6,301^{1}
- Australian Capital Territory: 3,826^{1}
- Tasmania: 1,478^{1}
- Northern Territory: 1,384^{1}

Languages
- Sinhala, Tamil, Australian English

Religion
- Buddhism, Christianity, Hinduism and Islam

Related ethnic groups
- Sri Lankans
- ^{1} Populations based on those with Sri Lankan or Sinhalese Ancestry, recorded in the 2021 Census.

Sri Lankan Australians (Sinhala: ශ්‍රී ලාංකික ඕස්ට්‍රේලියානුවන්, Tamil: இலங்கை ஆஸ்திரேலியர்கள்) are people of Sri Lankan heritage living in Australia; this includes Sri Lankans by birth and by ancestry. Sri Lankan Australians constitute one of the largest groups of Overseas Sri Lankan communities and are the largest diasporic Sri Lankan community in Oceania, numbering 153,267 individuals in 2021, according to the Census. Sri Lankan Australians consist of people with Sinhalese, Tamil, Moor, Burgher, Malay and Chinese origins among others.

== History ==
Historical population
Year	Pop.	±%
1816	2	—
1876	≈500	—
1901	609	—
1911	611	+0.3%
1921	637	+4.3%
1933	638	+0.2%
1947	*	—
1954	1,961	—
1961	3,433	+75.1%
1966	5,562	+62.0%
1971	9,091	+63.4%
1976	14,866	+63.5%
1981	16,966	+14.1%
1986	22,513	+32.7%
1991	37,283	+65.6%
1996	64,068	+71.8%
2001	53,461	−16.6%
2006	62,256	+16.5%
2011	86,412	+38.8%
2016	109,853	+27.1%
2021	131,904	+20.1%
2024**	172,800	+31.0%
Data is based on population born in Sri Lanka, Australian Government Census. *Included in Indian population **Preliminary estimate

=== Early arrivals ===
Recorded Sri Lankan immigration to Australia started in 1816, with the transportation of Drum Major William O'Dean (a Sri Lankan Malay) and his wife Eve (a Sinhalese). Early immigrants from Sri Lanka (at that time known as Ceylon) were generally (unlike the O'Deans) absorbed into the Aboriginal population. Other early references of Sri Lankan migration date back to the 1870s when authorities in South Australia sought out the possibility of importing labour from Ceylon. The first Sinhalese from Sri Lanka arrived in 1870 to work in sugarcane plantations in Queensland. A community was believed to exist on Thursday Island in 1876. In 1882, a group of 500 left Colombo for Queensland, mostly in Mackay.

=== 20th century ===
The number of permanent settlers arriving in Australia from Sri Lanka since 1991 (monthly)

Under the White Australia policy, immigration was negligible. It resumed after the Second World War primarily involving migration of Burghers, who fulfilled the then criteria that they should be of predominantly European ancestry and that their appearance should be European. By 1954 around 2000 Sri Lankans had been accepted. Sinhalese migration began in the 1960s but it was after the mid-1970s that large groups arrived, which also included Christians and Buddhists. During the 1970s intake restrictions loosened and Sri Lankan students undertook courses in Australia as part of the Colombo Plan prior to the formal dismantling of the White Australia policy, and after 1973 and from the early 1980s Sinhalese, Tamil and Moor migration resumed and increased.

=== Present ===
In The Australian People, S. Pinnawala writes that "social interaction between the various Sri Lankan migrant groups has often been influenced by factors originating in their home country".

In the 1980s, on a reflection of ethnic unrest in Sri Lanka, tensions between the Sinhalese and Tamil communities grew. However, in Pinnawala's opinion, more recently a Sri Lankan identity has developed among the various religious and ethnic migrants.

This has led to many new community organisations being established to promote Sri Lankan culture and traditions. There have also been strong links formed between Sinhalese Buddhists now living in Australia and their co-religionists from Burma, Thailand and Cambodia. Similar trends can be traced between Christian migrants from Sri Lanka who now live in Australia. The NASA Ambassador Megha Wijewardane is also a Sri Lankan-Australian.

== Demographics ==
People born in Sri Lanka as a percentage of the population in Sydney divided geographically by postal area, as of the 2011 census

People with Sinhalese ancestry as a percentage of the population in Sydney, divided geographically by postal area, as of the 2011 census

Over half (51.6%) of all Sri Lankan Australians live in Victoria, with the vast majority of those living in the state capital of Melbourne, with 78,687 individuals in the city recording Sri Lankan or Sinhalese ancestry at the 2021 Census, particularly within the South-Eastern suburbs. Areas with significant populations include the suburbs of Dandenong, Clyde North, Glen Waverley, Endeavour Hills, and Craigieburn (All aside Craigieburn are located in the South-East of the city).

The number of Sri Lankan Australians counted in 1996, including the second-generation, was 64,068. The 2011 census recorded 86,412 Sri Lankans born in Australia.

The rate of assimilation among Sri Lankan Australians is fairly high: among second-generation immigrants, the 'in-marriage' rate was extremely low – 5.6% for brides and 3.0% for grooms.

Sinhalese Australians have an exceptionally low rate of return migration to Sri Lanka. In December 2001, the Department of Foreign Affairs estimated that there were 800 Australian citizens resident in Sri Lanka. It is unclear whether these were returning Sri Lankan emigrants with Australian citizenship, their Sri Lankan Australian children, or other Australians present on business or for some other reason.

Tamils in Australia numbered 19,426 in the 2011 Census. The majority of Tamils born in Sri Lanka came to Australia after 1983 when Sri Lanka faced ethnic turmoil and unrest (Black July). The Western suburbs of Sydney and the South Eastern Suburbs of Melbourne have a relatively high number of Tamil speaking people. There were 73161 Tamil speakers according to the 2016 Census, with the largest proportion of people across Australia in the Western Sydney suburb of Westmead (1,425 people, or 3.6% of people in that suburb), followed by Toongabbie (1,404 people, or 3.5% of people in that suburb). Numerous Tamil schools and Hindu Temples have been established in all main cities to cater for the growing Sri Lankan Tamil population.

Analysis of 2011 census by language and ancestry
Ancestry	Language (first ancestry)						Language (second ancestry)					
Ancestry	Tamil	English	Sinhala	Not stated	Other	Total	Tamil	English	Sinhala	Not stated	Other	Total
Tamil	11,407	1,057	85	58	149	12,756	650	257	16	13	48	984
Indian Tamil	406	50	4	3	15	478	21	12	0	0	-1	32
Sri Lankan Tamil	4,153	702	102	27	41	5,025	62	83	6	0	8	159
Sub-total Tamil	15,966	1,809	191	88	205	18,259	733	352	22	13	55	1,175
Indian	20,923	77,033	64	3,204	249,641	350,865	540	31,992	38	217	7,246	40,033
Sri Lankan	8,534	23,792	27,862	442	1,551	62,181	300	11,541	679	47	389	12,956
Australian	748	4,777,283	684	24,942	118,275	4,921,932	82	2,135,198	50	6,458	34,761	2,176,549
Sinhalese	942	2,351	16,898	115	225	20,531	76	901	1,372	13	54	2,416
English	862	7,062,120	809	33,676	125,990	7,223,457	7	13,136	8	107	1,821	15,079
Malay	502	6,973	17	134	13,230	20,856	91	9,015	32	56	3,568	12,762
Singaporean	178	1,930	0	123	1,302	3,533	25	2,083	0	13	498	2,619
Not stated	856	391,451	913	979,843	102,167	1,475,230	47,984	10,434,941	45,710	1,060,759	3,465,645	15,055,039
Other	640	4,164,549	754	42,924	3,202,008	7,410,875	313	3,870,132	281	17,808	300,557	4,189,091
Total	50,151	16,509,291	48,192	1,085,491	3,814,594	21,507,719	50,151	16,509,291	48,192	1,085,491	3,814,594	21,507,719

=== Language ===
In 2006, there were 29,055 Australians who spoke Sinhalese at home. SBS Radio is available in Sinhalese, and Melbourne television channel Channel 31 runs the Sri Lankan Morning show, which has sections in Sinhalese.

=== Religion ===
Religion of Sri Lankan Australians (2021)
1. Buddhism (45.3%)
2. Catholic (19.4%)
3. Hinduism (16.1%)
4. Other Christian (3.60%)
5. Islam (3.30%)
6. Other (12.4%)

In 2021, 45.3% of the Sri Lankan born population in Australia identified as Buddhist, 19.4% as Catholic, 16.1% as Hindu, 4.9% as Irreligious, and 3.6% as Anglican.

Most Sinhalese in Australia are Theravada Buddhists, and a small percentage of Sinhalese follow branches of Christianity. Sri Lankans have established many Theravada Buddhist temples across Victoria, New South Wales, Queensland and South Australia including the Dhamma Sarana Buddhist Temple of Melbourne's eastern suburbs.

The majority of Sri Lankan Tamils are Hindu. The Siva Vishnu Temple in Carrum Downs in the south east of Melbourne is a temple built by Sri Lankan Tamils. The Sunshine Murugan Temple in western Melbourne also caters to the Tamil community. The Sydney Murugan Temple was constructed for the needs of the Tamil population in Western Sydney. Smaller temples have been built in the greater Sydney area. In other cities such as Adelaide, Brisbane, Perth, Townsville, Darwin, Canberra, and Hobart, Hindu temples have also been built.

== Culture ==
Popularly celebrated community festivals include Sri Lankan Independence Day (4 February) and Sri Lankan New Year (14 April). Sri Lankan restaurants are becoming a popular feature of shopping strips in Melbourne, Hawthorn, Brunswick, Northcote, Glen Waverley and Dandenong, while Sri Lankan Australian media is also growing with newspapers, television and radio stations broadcasting cultural programs.

== Community ==
Suburb (Note: Areas with a high concentration of Sri Lankans in Australia, according to the 2006 Census.)	Percentage of Sri Lankans
Pendle Hill, New South Wales	9.4%
Homebush, New South Wales	8.5%
Homebush West, New South Wales	5.4%
Endeavour Hills, Victoria	5.3%
Dandenong, Victoria	4.8%
Strathfield South, New South Wales	4.8%
Lynbrook, Victoria	4.5%
Hallam, Victoria	4.3%
Lyndhurst, Victoria	4.2%
Dandenong North, Victoria	3.7%
Hampton Park, Victoria	3.7%
Noble Park, Victoria	3.6%
Glen Waverley, Victoria	3.6%
Clayton South, Victoria	3.4%
Clayton, Victoria	3.3%
Oakleigh East, Victoria	3.2%
Keysborough, Victoria	3.1%
Lidcombe, New South Wales	3.1%

=== Australia ===
Events

- Lankan Fest – Sri Lankan cultural show in Melbourne

Organizations

- Sri Lanka Association of NSW Inc.

Sri Lanka Association of NSW Inc

- Global Sri Lankan Forum
- Sri Lanka German Technical Training Institute - Old boys Association Australia Inc.
- Sri Lankan Study Centre for the Advancement of Technology & Social Welfare Inc (SCATS), Australia (1992)
- Australia Sri Lanka Council (1994)
- Committee for Sri Lanka (1993)
- Sri Lanka Podujana Peramuna Australia Inc.
- Multicultural Human Power Incorporated
- United Sri Lankan Muslim Association (1990)

=== Canberra ===
- Sri Lanka Dhamma Vihara Association of Canberra
- Lankans Canberra Foundation
- Sri Lanka High Commissions
- Sinhala Cultural Association of Canberra

=== New South Wales ===
Organizations

- Anandians of NSW
- Austra-Lanka Muslims Association (ALMA)
- Sinhala Association of NSW
- Sinhalese Cultural Forum of NSW
- Sri Lankan Australian Malay Association (SLAMA)
- The Sri Lanka Association of NSW
- University of Colombo Alumni Association NSW Inc.

Radio

- SBS Radio 2 (Sydney 97.7 fm)
- SBS Radio 2 (Wollongong 1035 am)

=== Victoria ===
Events

- Lankan Fest – Sri Lankan cultural show in Melbourne

Organizations

- Anandians of Victoria
- Association of Sri Lankan Muslims in Australia (ASLAMA)
- Black & Gold of Victoria – D.S. Senanayake College Old Boys Association
- Ceylon Circle
- Federation of Ethnic Communities' Councils of Australia
- Good Shepherd Convent Colombo Past Pupils' Association
- Katherine Keegel Children's Fund (KKCF)
- Northern Melbourne Sri Lankan Senior's Association Inc.
- Royal College Old Boys Association
- Nalandians In Sydney – Nalanda College Old Boys Association, Sydney, Australia (NIS)
- Nalanda College Old Boys Association, Melbourne, Australia
- Nalanda College Old Boys Association, Queensland, Australia
- Nalanda College Old Boys Association, Perth, Australia
- Sinhalese Cultural and Community Service Foundation
- Society for Peace Unity and Human Rights for Sri Lanka (SPUR)
- Sri Lankan Association of Victoria (formerly the Ceylon Club of Australia)
- Sri Lankan Study Centre for the Advancement of Technology and Social Welfare
- St. Joseph's College Old Boys Union, the biggest alumni association based on a Sri Lankan school in Australia
- ST Peters Old Boys Union Melbourne
- Trinity College Old Boys Association
- United Sri Lankan Muslim Association of Australia (USMAA)
- Maris Stella College OBA Melbourne Branch
- Visakha Vidyalaya Past Pupils Association (VVPPA)
- Kelaniya University Alumni Association Australia
- Anula Vidyalaya Past Pupils Association Victoria (AVPPAV)
- St Benedict's College Old Boys Union

=== South Australia (Adelaide) ===
Organizations

- Adelaide Sri Lanka Buddhist Vihara
- Adelaide Sri Lankan Community
- Australia Sri Lanka Association (ASLA) Australia Sri Lanka Association - ASLA | Adelaide Airport SA

Newspapers

- Hiru Kirana (Sinhala)
- Pahana (Sinhala)
- Sannasa (Sinhala)

TV

- One World Sri Lanka (Channel 31)
- Sri Lanka Clip Show (Channel 31)
- Sri Lanka Morning Show (Channel 31)
- Sri Lanka Today (Channel 31)
- TV Sri Lanka (Channel 31)

Radio

- SBS Radio 2 (93.1 fm)

=== Western Australia ===
Organizations

- Anandians of Western Australia
- AusLanka Charity Foundation
- Sri Lankan Australian Youth Association
- Sri Lankan Buddhist Vihara Perth Western Australia
- Sri Lankan Cultural Society of Western Australia
- Sri Lankan Muslim Society of Western Australia Inc.

=== Northern Territory ===
- The Buddhist Society of the N.T.
- Sri Lanka Australia Friendship Association

== See also ==
- Australia–Sri Lanka relations
- Colombo Plan
- Tamil Australians
