= Henley High School (Australia) =

High school in Adelaide, South Australia

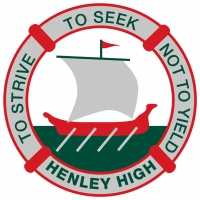

Location
- Cudmore Terrace; Henley Beach, South Australia; Australia

Information
- Type: Public school
- Established: 1958
- Principal: Tony Sims
- Enrolment: 1,386
- Campus: Henley Beach
- Colours: Green; Red; White
- Website: http://www.henleyhs.sa.edu.au

Henley High School is a co-educational public secondary school, located in Henley Beach, a suburb of Adelaide, South Australia.

Founded in 1958, the school consists of a middle school transition for years 7, 8 and 9, and SACE and vocational education and training for the senior classes.

== Notable alumni ==
- Rhea Ripley, professional wrestler
- Nathan Bock, Australian rules footballer
- Darcie Brown, cricketer
- Paul Caica, politician
- Luke Dunstan, Australian rules footballer
- Sam Durdin, Australian rules footballer
- Cam Ellis-Yolmen, Australian rules footballer
- Sam Gray, Australian rules footballer
- Brian Lake, Australian rules footballer
- Jack Lukosius, Australian rules footballer
- Scott Lycett, Australian rules footballer
- Stefan Mauk, soccer player
- Ben Garuccio, soccer player
- John Koutroumbis, soccer player
- Kusini Yengi, soccer player
- Sam Mayes, Australian rules footballer
- Ken McGregor, Australian rules footballer
- Lachlan McNeil, Australian rules footballer
- Josh Morris, Australian rules footballer
- Jared Polec, Australian rules footballer
- Caleb Poulter, Australian rules footballer
- Izak Rankine, Australian rules footballer
- John Rau, politician
- Brodie Smith, Australian rules footballer
- Phoenix Spicer, Australian rules footballer
- Rhys Stanley, Australian rules footballer
- Paul Stewart, Australian rules footballer
- Steven Stretch, Australian rules footballer
- Jay Weatherill, politician
- Mattaes Phillipou, Australian rules footballer
- Tkay Maidza, Musician
