= Hinduism in Australia =

Australian Hindus

- Hinduism in Australia

Total population
- ▲684,002 (2021) ▲2.7% of the Australian population

Regions with significant populations
- Sydney; Canberra; Melbourne; Adelaide; Perth; Brisbane

Languages
- English, Hindi, Tamil, Malayalam, Telugu, Punjabi, Gujarati, Bengali, Fiji Hindi, Nepali, Mauritian Creole

Hinduism is the third-largest religion in Australia. At the 2021 census, 684,002 people (2.7% of the population) reported Hinduism, up from 275,534 in 2011. More than two thirds of Australian Hindus live in New South Wales and Victoria. There are Hindu temples in every state and territory, listed in List of Hindu temples in Australia.

Hindus first came to Australia in the nineteenth century, and many worked as camel drivers, merchants and hawkers, selling goods between small rural communities. Most Australian Hindus today are of Indian origin. Others come from Sri Lanka, Fiji, Malaysia, Bali, Singapore, Mauritius and Nepal.

== History ==
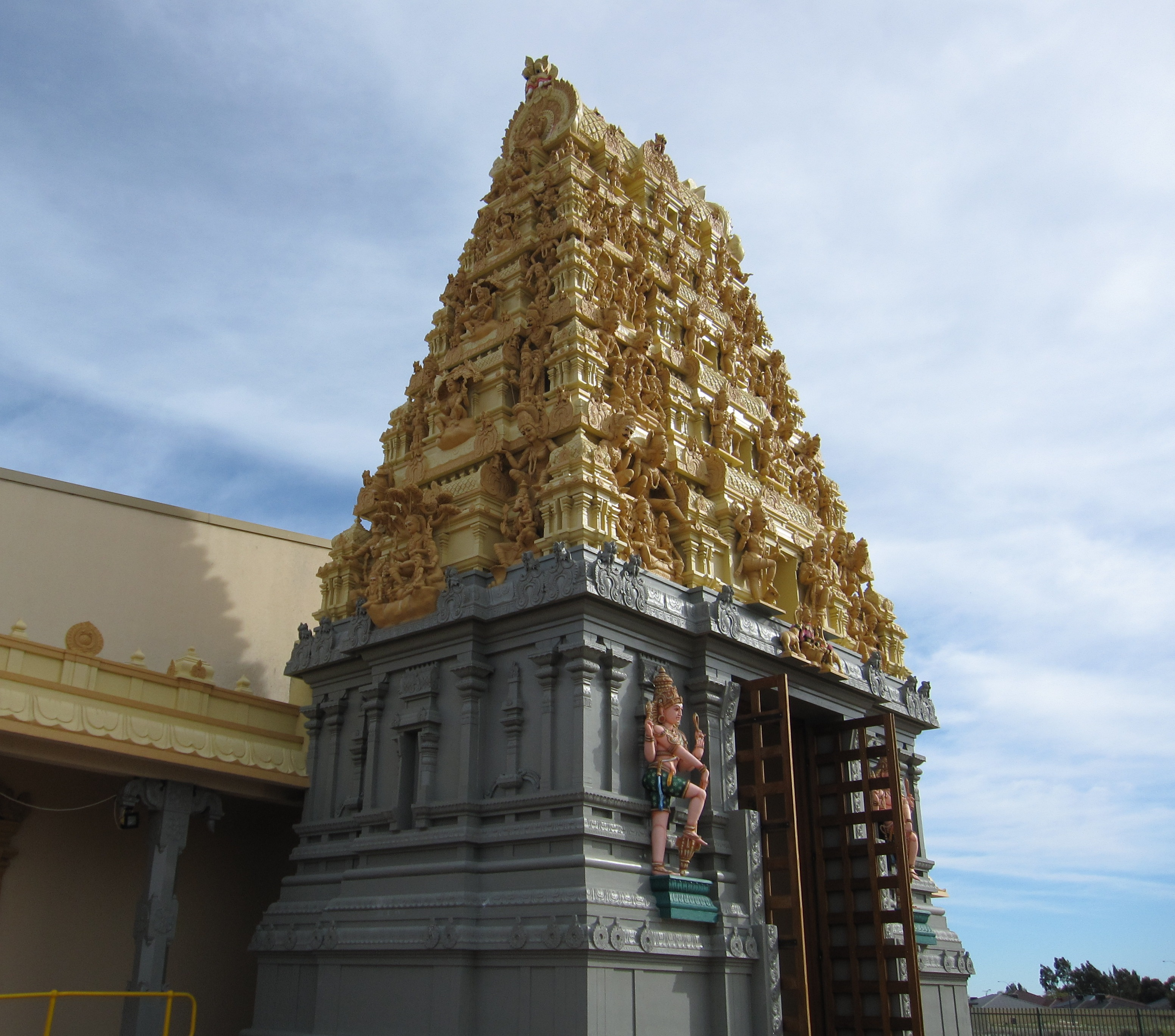
Perth Shiva Temple

=== Early presence ===
The following dates briefly outline the arrival of Hinduism.

- 1836 – The census recorded 277 Hindus in Victoria.
- 1844 – P. Friell who had previously lived in India, brought 25 domestic workers from India to Sydney and these included a few women and children.
- 1850s – A Hindu Sindhi merchant, Shri Pammull, built a family opal trade in Melbourne that has prosperously continued with his third-to fourth-generation descendants.
- 1890 – The census showed that 521 Hindus were living in New South Wales.
- 1907 – About 800 Indians lived in Australia; most lived in northern New South Wales and Queensland.
- 1911 – The census counted 3,698 "Hindoos", the majority of whom were Hindus.
- 1921 – Less than 2,200 Indians lived in Australia.

=== Migration and institutional growth since the 1970s ===
- 1971 – Swami Prabhupada arrives in Australia and founded first Hare Krishna centre in Sydney.
- 1977 – The first Hindu temple in Australia, the Sri Mandir Temple, was built. Established by three devotees; Dr Prem Shankar (from Ujhani, UP), Dr Padmanabn Shrindhar Prabhu and Dr Anand, who bought an old house in Auburn NSW and paid $12000.00 to convert it into a temple.
- 1981 – The census recorded 12,466 Hindus in Victoria and 12,256 in NSW from a total of 41,730 in the entire country.
- 1985 – A Hindu society, the Saiva Manram, was formed to build a temple for Lord Murukan. Since its inception, Lord Murukan has been called 'Sydney Murukan'. The Saiva Manram has worked for nearly ten years to build a temple for Lord Murukan.
- 1986 – According to the 1986 census, the number of Hindus in Australia surpasses 21,000.
- 1991 – According to the 1991 census, the number of Hindus in Australia surpasses 43,000.
- 1995 – Completion of the Brisbane Selva Vinayakar Kovil the consecration ceremony was held on 5 February 1995.
- 1996 – Hindus with their birthplace in India made up 31 per cent of all Hindus in Australia. The census also showed there were 67,270 Hindus living in Australia.
- 2001 – According to the 2001 census, the number of Hindus in Australia surpasses 95,000.
- 2003 – Sri Karphaga Vinayakar Temple was formed to build a temple for Lord Ganesha/Ganapathi/Vinayakar. Since its inception, Lord Ganesh has been called 'Sydney Ganesh Temple'.
- 2006 – According to the 2006 census, the number of Hindus in Australia was 148,123.
- 2011 – According to the 2011 census, the number of Hindus in Australia was 275,535.
- 2016 – 2016 Census data states that Hindus comprise almost 2% of the Australian population.

== Demographics ==
=== Population growth ===
Hindus in Australia by census
Year	Hindus	Share of population	Change in share (percentage points)
1911	414	–	–
1933	212	–	–
1986	21,500	0.14%	–
1991	43,580	0.25%	+0.11
1996	67,270	0.38%	+0.13
2001	95,473	0.51%	+0.13
2006	148,123	0.75%	+0.24
2011	275,534	1.28%	+0.53
2016	440,300	1.90%	+0.62
2021	684,002	2.7%	+0.80

Source: Australian Bureau of Statistics, Census of Population and Housing.

=== Distribution by state and territory ===
State or territory	2021 census	% 2021 census	2016 census	% 2016 census	2011 census	% 2011 census	2011–21 growth	Reference
New South Wales	273,780	3.4%	181,409	2.4%	119,800	1.7%	+153,980 128.5%	
Victoria	214,058	3.3%	134,938	2.3%	83,141	1.6%	+130,917 157.5%	
Queensland	69,520	1.3%	45,957	1.0%	28,641	0.7%	+40,879 142.7%	
Western Australia	52,055	2.0%	38,741	1.6%	21,024	0.9%	+31,031 147.6%	
South Australia	38,105	2.1%	22,921	1.4%	13,622	0.9%	+24,483 179.7%	
Capital Territory	20,505	4.5%	10,212	2.6%	6,041	1.7%	+14,464 239.4%	
Northern Territory	6,236	2.7%	3,567	1.6%	1,639	0.8%	+4,597 280.5%	
Tasmania	9,724	1.7%	2,554	0.5%	1,621	0.3%	+8,103 499.9%	

The 2016 Census noted 415 Hindus belonging to the indigenous community of Australia (Aboriginal and Torres Strait Islander people).

=== Geographic concentration ===
Hindu population as a share of the total population, by statistical local area, 2011 census, 2016 census

People who are affiliated with Hinduism as a percentage of the total population in Australia divided geographically by statistical local area, as of the 2011 census

As per 2021 census, Hindus form 2.7% of Australia's total population. From 2011 to 2021, the number of Hindus increased from 275,534 to 684,002, a growth of 408,462 or 148.2%.

The majority of Australian Hindus live along the Eastern Coast of Australia, mainly in the cities of Melbourne and Sydney. At the 2016 census, about 39% of Hindus lived in Greater Sydney, 29% in Greater Melbourne, and 8% each in Greater Brisbane and Greater Perth. The states and territories with the highest proportion of Hindus were the Australian Capital Territory (2.57%) and New South Wales (2.43%), and those with the lowest were Queensland (0.98%) and Tasmania (0.50%).

According to the 2006 Census, 44.16% of all Australians who were born in India were Hindu, so were 47.20% of those born in Fiji, 1.84% born in Indonesia, 3.42% from Malaysia, and 18.61% from Sri Lanka.

In Tasmania, Hinduism is practised mainly by the Lhotshampa community from Bhutan.

=== Hindu communities and converts ===
Hinduism is growing among the Anglo-Australian population. Many Caucasians in Australia also visit the Hindu temple at Carrum Downs (Shri Shiva Vishnu Temple) and learn Vedic Hindu scriptures in Tamil. The ISKCON Hindu community in Australia has 60,000 members - 70% of whom are Hindus from overseas, with the other 30% being Anglo Australians.

=== Languages ===
According to the 2021 Census, 13.0% of Australian Hindus speak English at home. English (88,832 or 13.0%) is the third most common language spoken by Australian Hindus, behind Hindi (155,242 or 22.7%) and Nepali (111,353 or 16.3%). The number of Australian Hindus speaking various languages in their home according to the 2006 census:

- Indian migrants speak Hindi, Tamil, Gujarati, Telugu, Punjabi, Malayalam, Marathi, Kannada etc.
- Tamil by immigrants from India, Sri lanka, Singapore, Malaysia, Mauritius
- Nepali by immigrants from Nepal, Bhutan and India.
- Bengali by immigrants from India and Bangladesh.
- Fijian Hindi and Fijian by migrants from Fiji
- Mauritian Creole by migrants from Mauritius
- Balinese and Indonesian by Indonesian migrants
- Other languages such as French, Malay, Sinhalese, Italian, Vietnamese, etc.

Language	2011	2016	2021	Hindus as % of language speakers
Total	275,534	440,300	684,002	2.70%
Hindi	81,892	119,284	155,242	78.8%
Nepali	21,766	50,629	111,353	83.7%
English	39,800	58,855	88,832	0.5%
Gujarati	29,250	45,884	71,976	88.5%
Tamil	36,940	53,766	69,807	73.2%
Telugu	16,717	30,723	52,583	90.2%
Punjabi	9,442	16,546	36,367	15.2%
Marathi	8,774	11,589	19,780	88.8%
Malayalam	5,938	11,687	17,772	22.6%
Kannada	5,383	8,783	13,419	91.2%
Bengali	5,685	8,481	11,810	16.8%
Fijian Hindi	572	1,257	2,407	50.5%
Indonesian	1,171	1,755	2,215	3.0%
French	1,180	1,401	1,425	2.0%
Konkani	609	845	1,370	37.6%
Odia	282	694	1,338	95.5%
Sindhi	277	521	892	33.9%
Tulu	348	543	845	93.2%
Mauritian Creole	514	883	813	22.5%
South Asian nfd	3,531	3,770	548	7.8%
Malay	435	591	487	2.3%
Assamese	165	302	479	82.3%
Italian	158	158	322	0.1%
Fijian	129	213	198	1.9%
Balinese	129	156	193	80.8%
Vietnamese	109	225	192	0.0%
Sinhalese	232	163	167	0.2%
Indo-Aryan nfd	1,988	633	NA	NA

== Temples and religious institutions ==
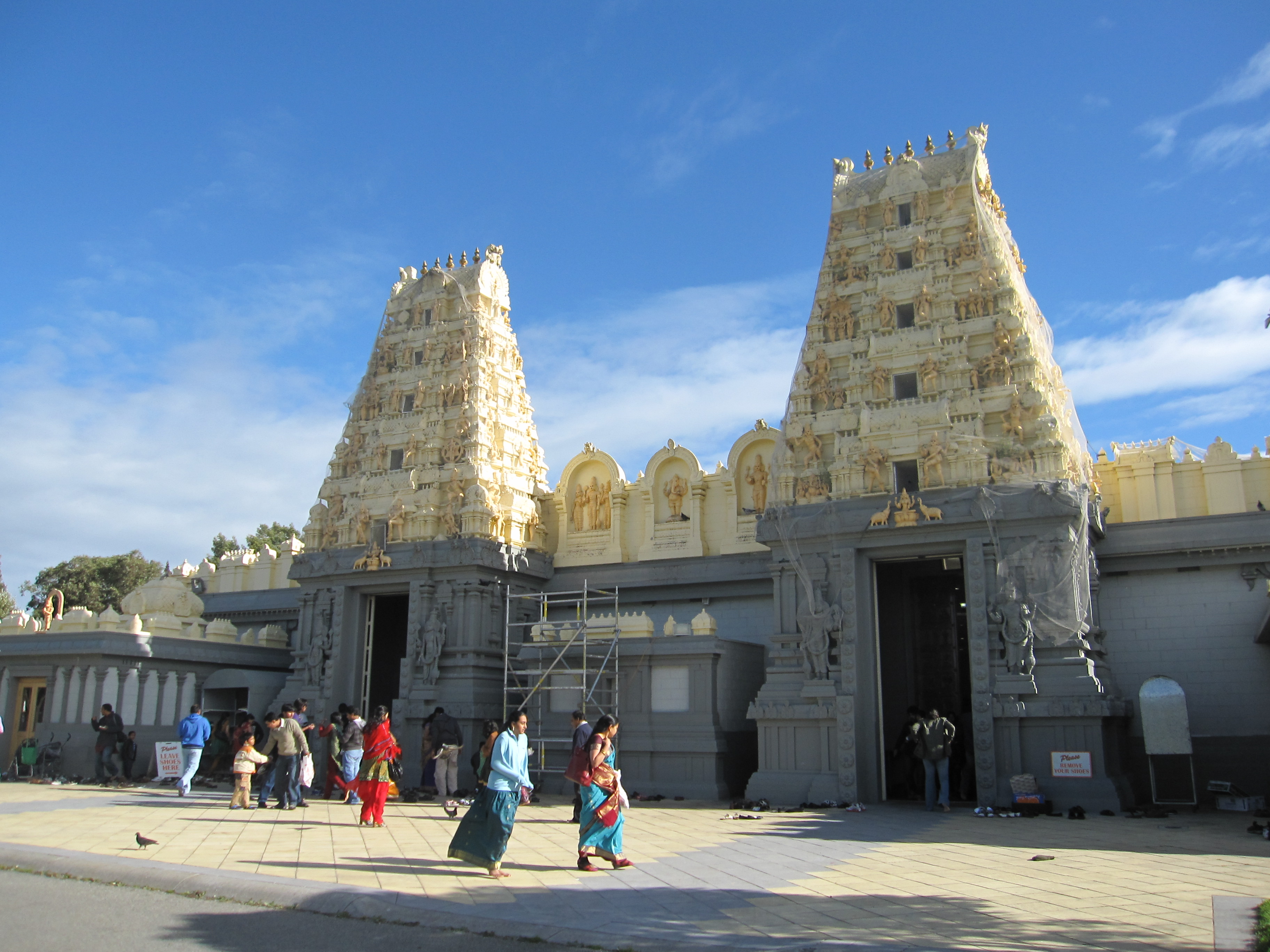
Shiva Vishnu Temple, Melbourne

Hindu temples in Australia are concentrated in the capital cities, particularly Sydney and Melbourne. They include the Sydney Durga Temple at Regents Park in Sydney, and the Perth Shiva Temple and Bala Murugan Temple in Perth. A BAPS mandir opened at Taylor in Canberra in 2024, built largely by volunteers.

== Discrimination and social indicators ==
According to a national survey reported in 2017, Hindu Australians experienced the highest rates of discrimination. At the 2016 census, women aged 45 to 49 who reported Hinduism had an average of 1.81 children, compared with 2.02 for all Australian women in that age group, 2.11 for Christian women and 3.03 for Muslim women.

== Festivals and public life ==
Diwali celebrations in Melboure, 2014

Two members of Australian parliaments have taken their oath of office on the Bhagavad Gita. Daniel Mookhey did so on entering the New South Wales Legislative Council in May 2015, which was reported at the time as an Australian first. Varun Ghosh, a Labor senator for Western Australia, was sworn in on the same text in 2024 and was reported as the first senator to do so.

Diwali has received official recognition in New South Wales. Parliament House in Sydney was illuminated for the festival on 4 November 2021, which the presiding officers said recognised the state's Hindu, Sikh and Jain communities.

In April 2025 the New South Wales Government announced $3.75 million towards a Hindu Cultural and Education Centre at Parramatta, intended as the administrative home of the Hindu Council of Australia.

== Christmas Island ==
Hinduism is practised by the small number of Malaysian Indians in Christmas Island. According to the 2021 census, Hinduism constitute 0.6% of its population.

== Temple vandalism and threats ==
- 2023 Jan: Three Hindu temples were vandalized across Australia namely the BAPS Swaminarayan Temple of Melbourne, Shiva Vishnu Temple of Carrum Downs, Victoria and ISKCON Temple of Melbourne with anti-Hindu graffiti by Khalistani extremists. High Commission of India to Australia condemned the repeated hate-crimes and the Australian High Commission to India assured support and solidarity with the Hindu community of Australia. Several top Australian lawmakers condemned the attacks on Hindu community's places of worship and stressed importance of respect in a multicultural society.
- 2023 Feb: Khalistani extremists made threatening phone calls to a prominent Hindu temple in Brisbane. The perpetrators demanded the temple raise Khalistan slogans if they wished to celebrate Mahashivratri peacefully. The calls came after three Hindu temples in Australia were defaced with anti-India graffiti, allegedly by Khalistani extremists.
- 2023 Mar: The Shree Laxmi Narayan Temple in Brisbane was vandalized by Khalistani extremists with anti-Hindu graffiti on the walls of temple. Sarah L Gates, the Director of Hindu Human Rights suspects that the hate crime is an attempt to terrorize Hindu community by members of Sikhs For Justice (SFJ) headed by Gurpatwant Singh Pannun, an individual designated as terrorist by the government of India. However the Australian Police claims they have no suspects or leads behind the vandalism.
- 2023 May: The BAPS Swaminarayan Temple of Sydney was vandalized with anti-Hindu graffiti allegedly by Khalistani extremists. Andrew Charlton, Member of Parliament from Parramatta expressed regret and visited the temple for helping the temple volunteers in cleaning the graffiti. Michelle Rowland, Minister of Communications condemned the vandalism. The Hindu Council of Australia called it not only an attack on sanctity of temple but also an insult to Australian Hindus and demanded investigation and justice.
- 2025 July: The Shree Swaminarayan Temple in Melbourne was vandalised with hateful racial slurs. Victoria's Premier Jacinta Allan's office sent out a private message to the Temple management. It read, "The Shree Swaminarayan Temple is so much more than a place of worship - it's a place of warmth and community... What happened this week was hateful, racist and deeply disturbing. It wasn't just vandalism - it was a deliberate act of hate, designed to intimidate, isolate, and spread fear." Hindu Council of Australia's President, Victoria chapter, Makrand Bhagwat expressed his deep shock at the vandalism of the holy place. He called it "an attack on our identity, our right to worship and freedom of religion".

== Image gallery ==
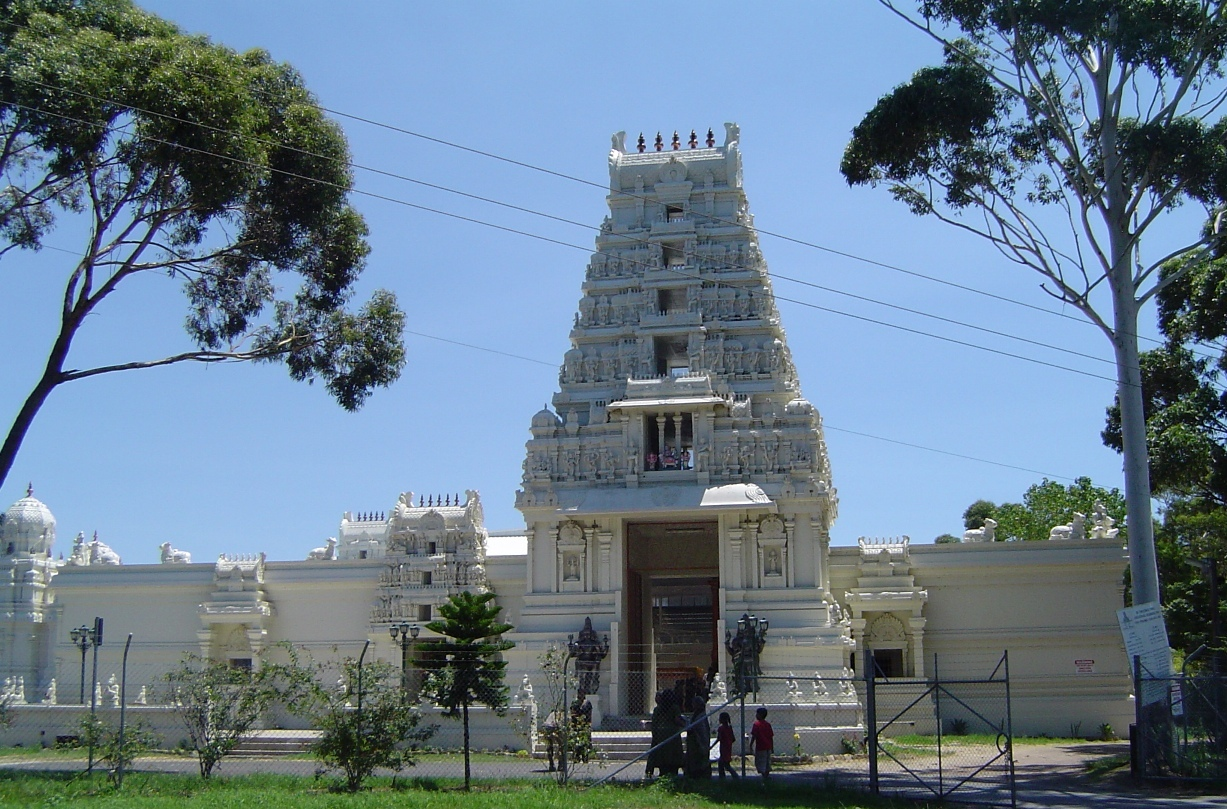
Sri Venkateswara Temple, Helensburgh

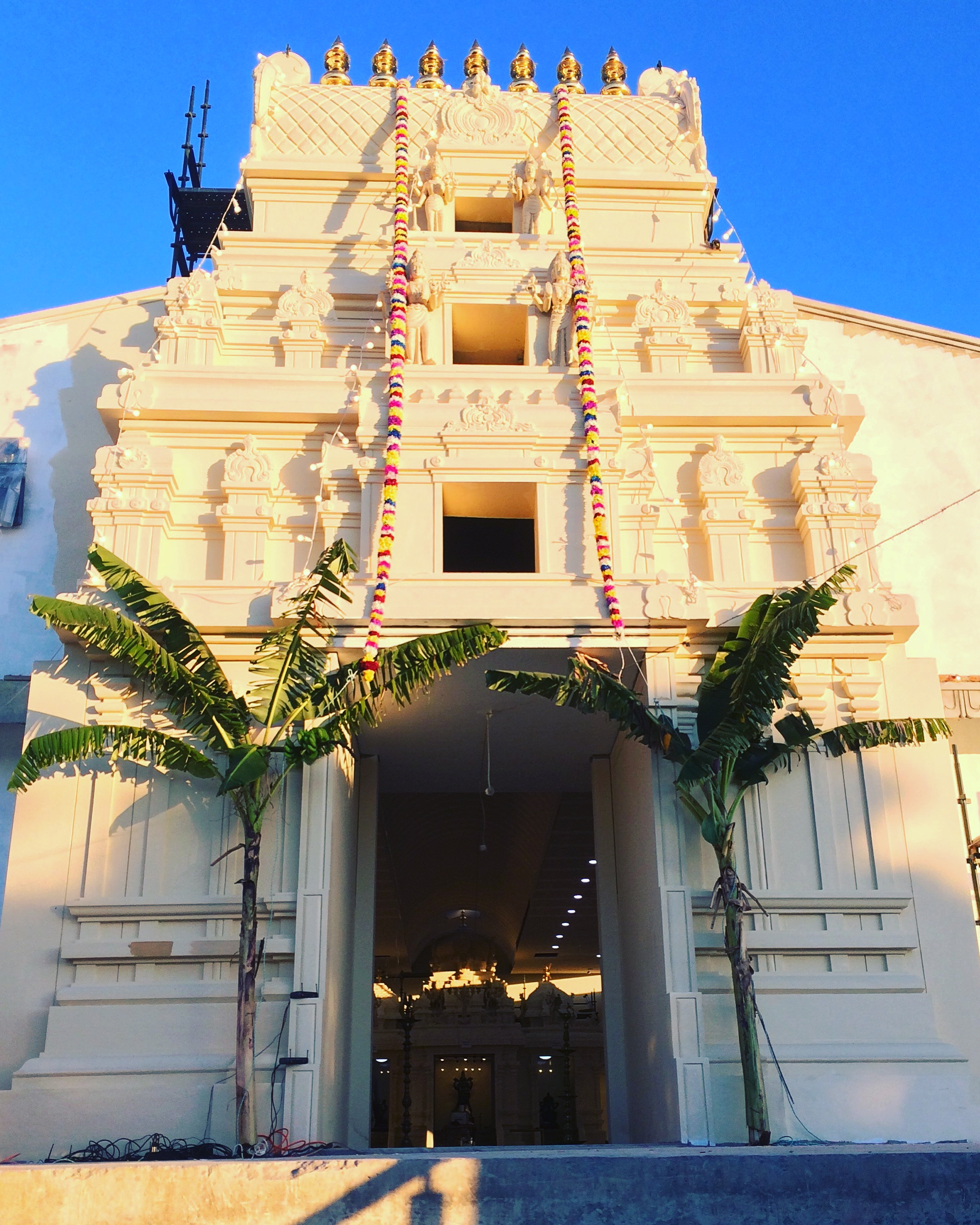
Sydney Durga Temple, Regents Park

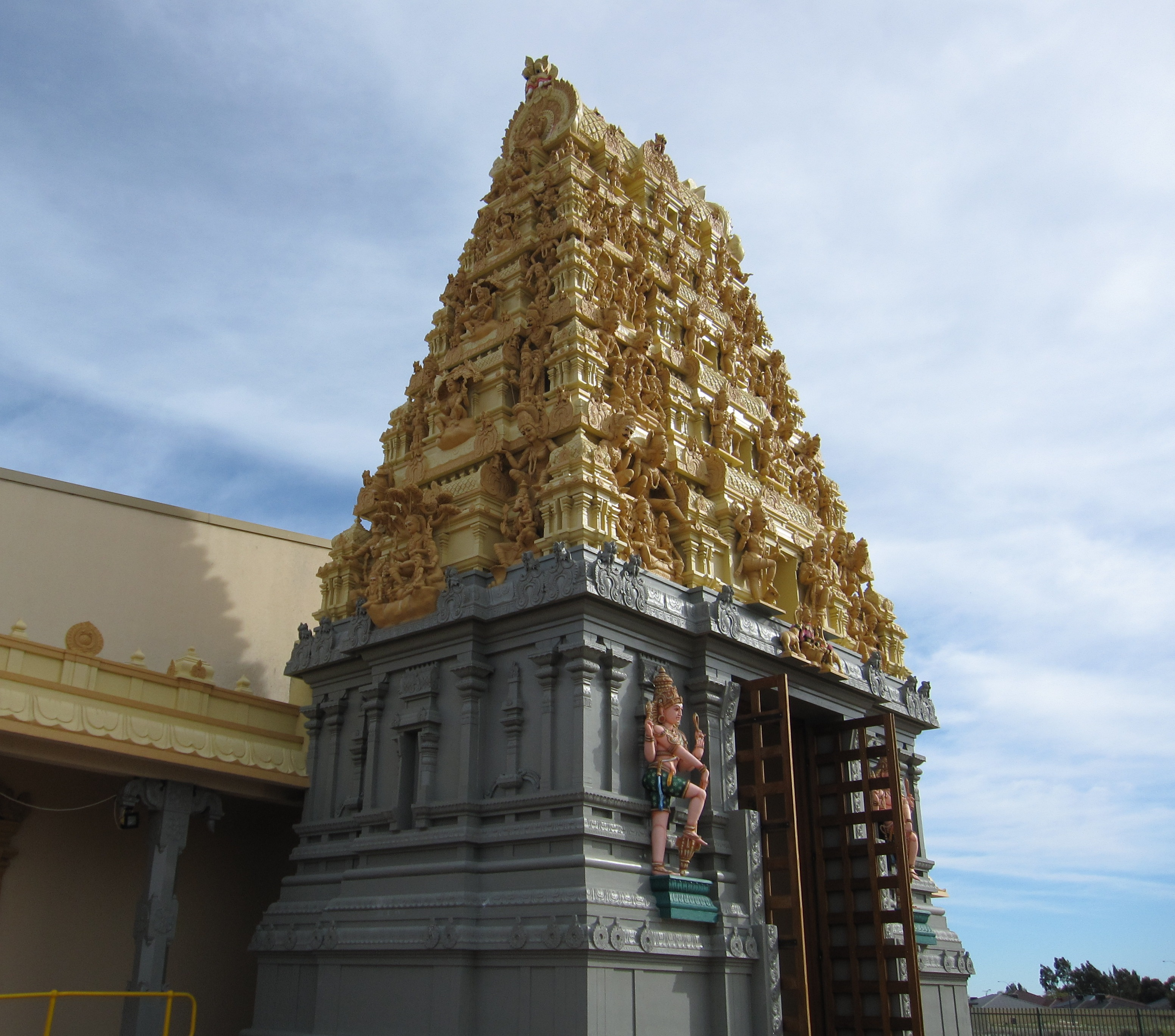
Perth Shiva Temple

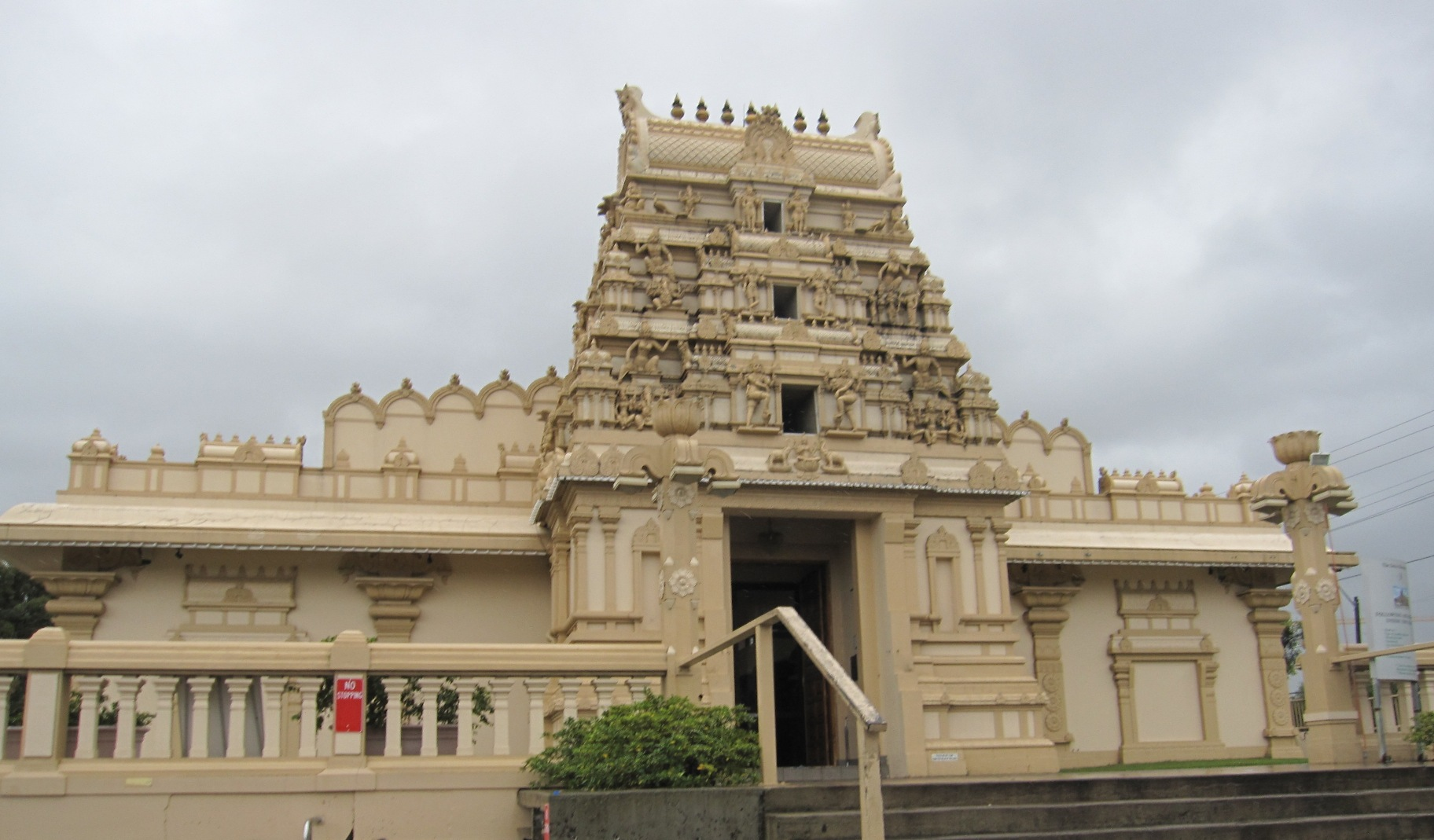
Lord Murugan Temple, Sydney

Shree Venkatesa Durga Temple, Kenmore, Brisbane

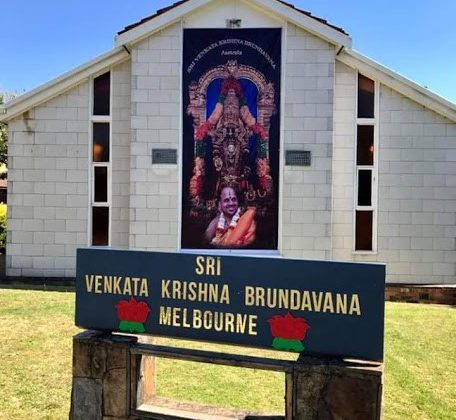
Sri Venkata Krishna Brundavana, Melbourne

== See also ==
- Religion in Australia
  - Indian Australians
  - List of Hindu temples in Australia
- Hinduism by country
  - Hinduism in New Zealand
  - Hinduism in Fiji
