= Megha Wijewardane =

Australian ambassador for NASA (born 2010)

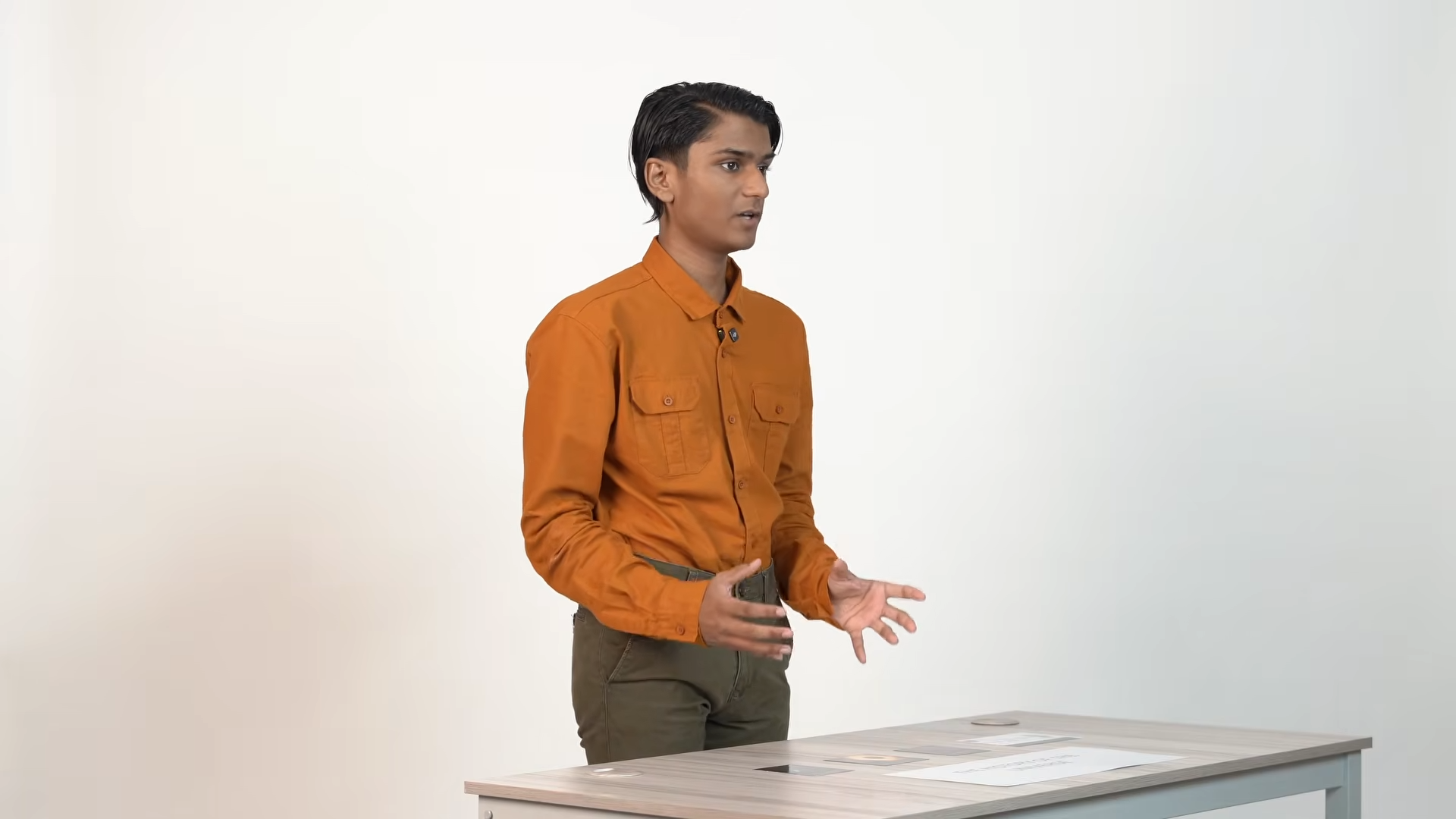
- Megha talking about Earth's formation in 2026
- Born: 29 March 2010 (age 16); Adelaide, Australia
- Education: Woodcroft College, Adelaide Westminster School, Adelaide Dara School, Adelaide Hamilton Secondary College Flinders University
- Known for: The youngest ambassador for NASA
- Parents: Charith Wijewardane (father); Doshanthri Ranatunge (mother)

Megha Mahima Wijewardane is an Australian scientific communicator, child prodigy, and the youngest ambassador for NASA's OSIRIS-Rex mission, representing Australia since 2019.

== Early life and education ==
Megha Wijewardane was born on 29 March 2010 in Adelaide, Australia to two Sri Lankan immigrant parents. He is the son of artist Charith Wijewardane, and former newspaper editor Doshanthri Ranatunge. He demonstrated an early aptitude for science and mathematics, and was raised in Old Reynella, in Adelaide's south.

In 2017, when he was 7 years old, he won the 2017 Northrop Grumman Prize at NASA's space apps challenge in Adelaide, competing with university students and aerospace engineers. In 2018, Megha again participated in NASA's Space Apps challenge. He worked on a solution regarding asteroid Bennu which is at risk of colliding with Earth in the future.

Later in 2018, he participated in the ActInSpace challenge. In that challenge, he became the youngest team leader in Australia to propose a solution for the category science and technology. In partnership with companies that worked with Airbus, he took part in a project to find a solution for the identification of ships being used for illegal activities - primarily fishing vessels, that have turned off transponders.

Due to his prior work on Bennu, a growing YouTube channel dedicated to science communication, and work with transponders, he was offered NASA ambassadorship for the mission OSIRIS-REx, becoming the youngest person in that role in the world, and the only in Australia, at the age of 9.

Later in 2019, aged 9, he, in collaboration with several other contestants in NASA's space apps challenge, built a platform to recover people who are highly exposed to natural disasters using NASA live satellite data. There they introduced an app called "Megha Naada" which can warn people before floods occur.

In 2021, in his 5th year at NASA's space apps challenge, Megha developed a desktop application called "Heatrix", which

interprets NASA earth fire data and uses the near real-time data and generates the data on an interactive map. The algorithm tells you the time detected the data source (NASA) Fire MW rating (on selected operating systems) and more. The data is accurate to a 1 km radius, beating most fire tracking systems. Every time a fire is detected, it is recorded and is used for predictive analytics. The algorithm also senses air pollution with the exact pollutant in the area and generates a warning (good, dangerous for sensitive groups, medium etc.). There is also a function where it reports stress due to a lack of moisture.

Megha was 11 years old when the application was published, and it was recognized for using crowdsourced data, and allowing real time reporting of environmental events.

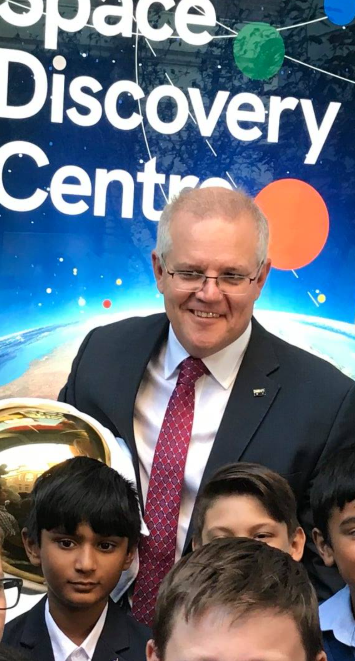
Megha (left) with Australian Prime Minister Scott Morrison at the opening of the Space Discovery Centre, aged 10-11

Megha studied at both Woodcroft College and Westminster School before attending Dara School in 2021, a specialized school for highly gifted students before finally moving to Hamilton Secondary College in 2022.

He was later selected to study part time for a physics major at the University of Flinders, at age 12.

== Career as a science communicator ==
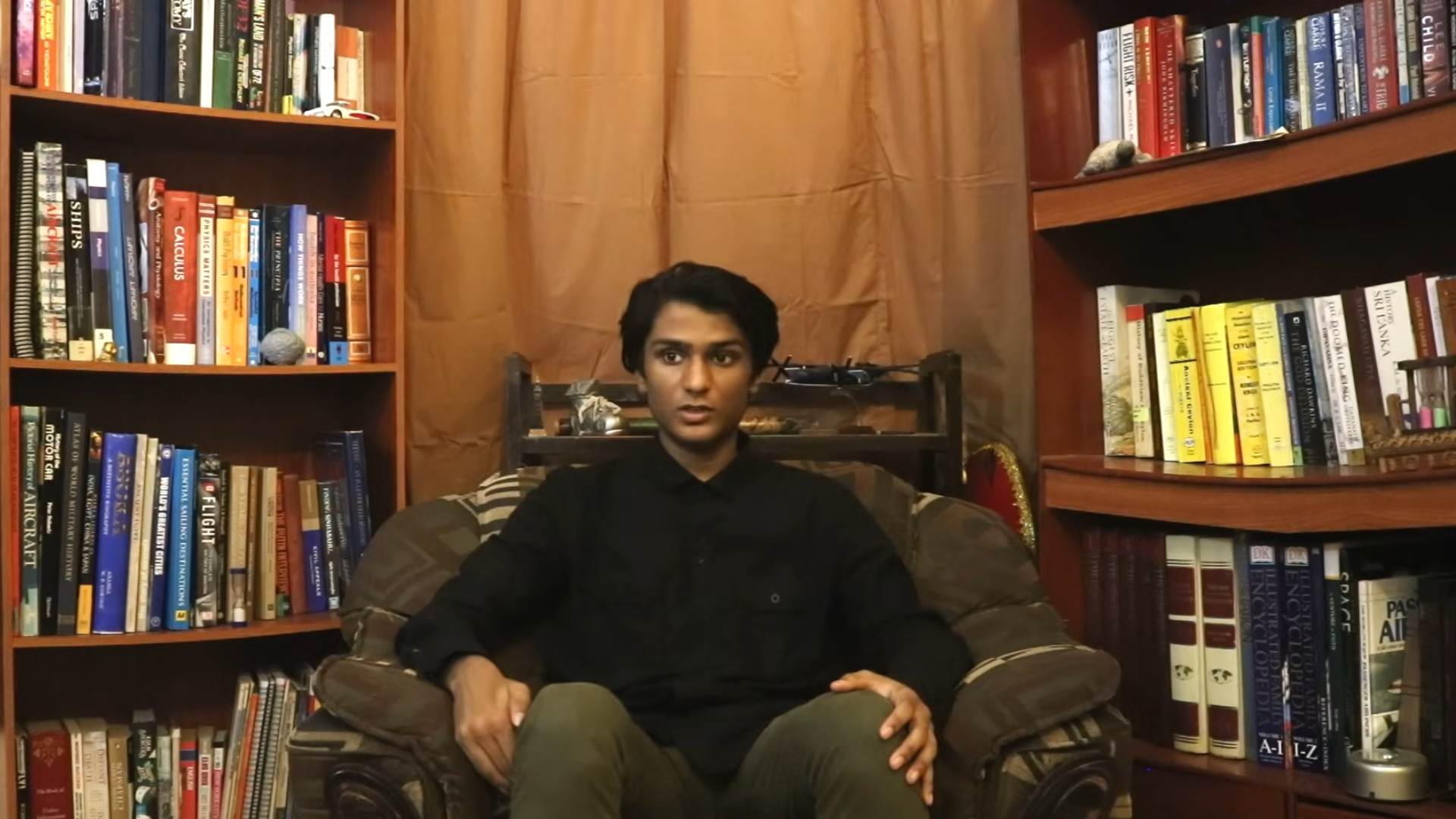
Megha talking about the Artemis missions in 2026

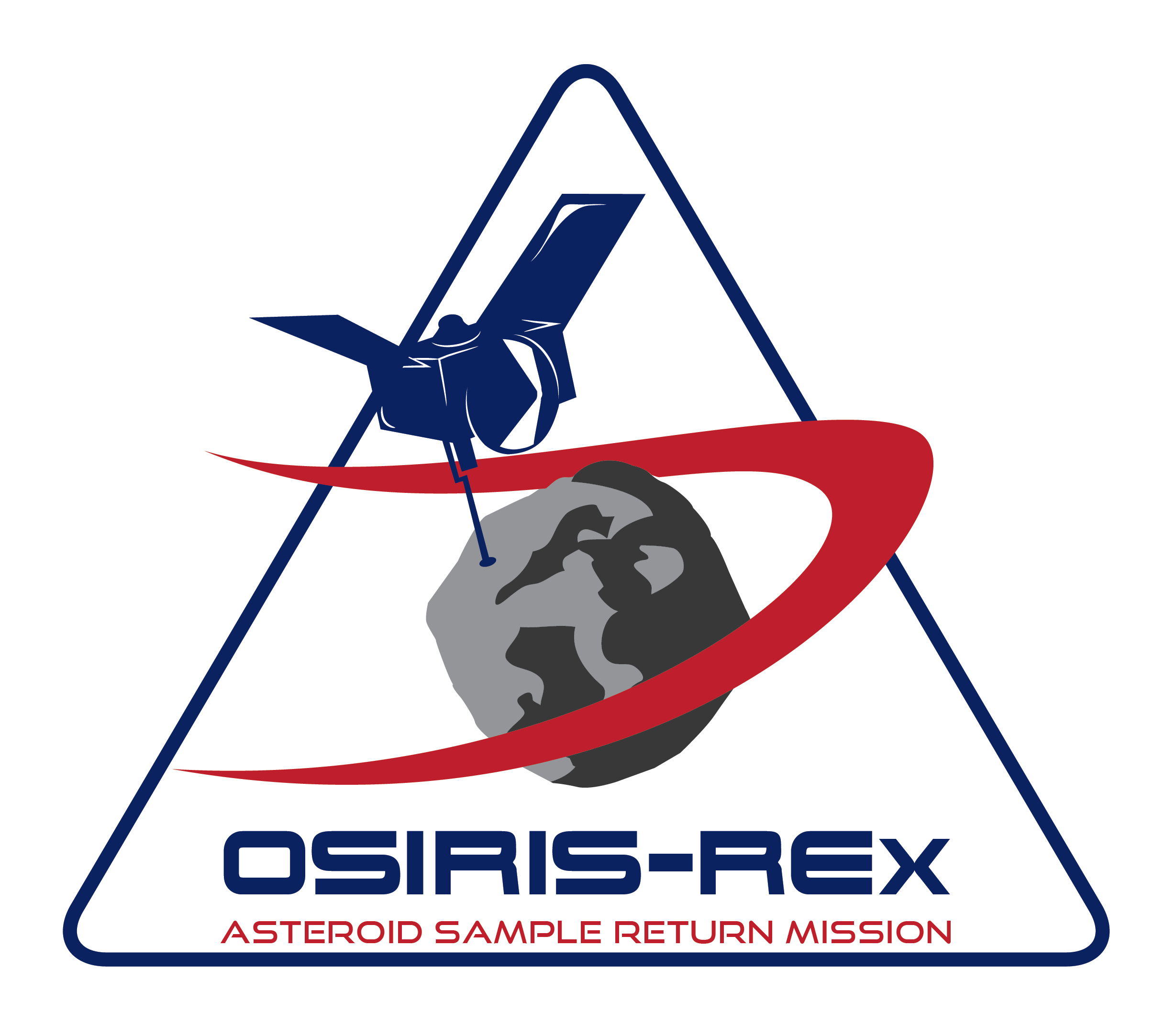
Mission logo for the OSIRIS-REx mission

His YouTube channel was created in 2016, at the age of 6, and gradually grew, becoming more prominent as his projects grew, with the depth of the subjects covered increasing over time. As of 2026, it had accumulated half a million views, covering a variety of subjects, namely mathematics, physics, biology, and astronomy.

In August 2025 he toured several Asian countries, including Sri Lanka, the country of his parents, and did a series of lectures, mainly focusing on the NASA space shuttle, at various aviation training centers.

After the international visits, in November 2025, he published a book about the modern history of Sri Lanka, specifically about the negative effects of colonialism. He also argued that it should have a space industry due to its equatorial position, which would make the launch of rockets cheaper.

On July 10, 2026, he announced the "Megha Wijewardane Podcast", a podcast that aims to upload videos every Friday, dedicated to STEM subjects. He made several videos in the series dedicated to disproving pseudoscience such as climate change denial, race realism, and flat earth.

== Controversy ==
In a social media post dated early 2026, Megha was the subject of criticism for how he addressed flat earthers, as he had referred to them as "stupid", "pseudoscientific", and "conspiracy theorists". He also used words like "zero brain cells" to describe flat earthers, as well as called them "flerfs". Others praised the post, arguing that despite him using a harsh tone, such conspiracy theories are harmful and attacking them was ultimately justified. A wave of conspiracy theorists flooded his social media accounts, calling him a "government shill", even on completely unrelated posts. The spamming made his Facebook page unusable, and Megha cited it as the reason for the permanent closure of his Facebook page in July 2026, stating that he would use YouTube as his primary platform from now on.

== Hobbies ==
He is skilled in a variety of sports and plays several instruments.

He has said he plans to start an company called Megha Systems to produce solar powered cars.
