= Phoenix Spicer =

Australian rules footballer (2002–2026)

Personal information
- Full name: Phoenix Kenny Spicer
- Born: 30 January 2002; Nhulunbuy, Northern Territory, Australia
- Died: 2 January 2026 (aged 23)
- Original team: South Adelaide (SANFL)
- Draft: No. 42, 2020 AFL draft, North Melbourne
- Debut: 22 August 2021, North Melbourne vs. Adelaide, at Adelaide Oval
- Height: 173 cm (5 ft 8 in)
- Weight: 64 kg (141 lb)
- Position: Midfielder/forward

Playing career
| Years | Club | Games (Goals) |
| 2021–2023 | North Melbourne | 12 (2) |

Phoenix Kenny Spicer (30 January 2002 – 2 January 2026) was an Australian rules footballer who played for the North Melbourne Football Club in the Australian Football League (AFL). Spicer was selected at pick 42 in the 2020 AFL draft from SANFL club South Adelaide.

== Early life and junior career ==
Phoenix Kenny Spicer was born on 30 January 2002 in Gove in the Northern Territory, but moved around through the first years of his life, living in Adelaide, Numbulwar and Darwin, before relocating permanently to Adelaide as a 10-year-old to live with his grandfather. His grandfather died when Spicer was a teenager. Spicer then moved in with a host family.

He attended Hamilton Secondary College before transitioning to Henley High School to further his opportunities as a footballer.

In his junior leagues, Spicer played for the Edwardstown Football Club and then the Morphettville Park Football Club.

Spicer was invited to try out for West Adelaide's under-16s team, but because of the lengthy commute from his home in the southern suburbs, his host family instead joined South Adelaide's under-16s team, and later played for their under-18s team. He recorded the fastest time of any participant in the agility test of South Adelaide's under-18s testing in 2019 and was contacted by recruiters from several AFL clubs in 2019, but his 2020 playing season was interrupted by a broken arm. He was drafted by North Melbourne with the 42nd selection of the 2020 AFL draft.

== AFL career ==
Spicer made his debut during round 23 of the 2021 AFL season with the Kangaroos playing against Adelaide in a losing game in which Spicer had seven disposals. He suffered from hamstring injuries and was limited to playing one game in his debut season and five games near the end of the 2022 season.

Spicer was involved in the design of North Melbourne's special guernsey for the 2023 Sir Doug Nicholls Round. The guernsey, called "Connecting Through Identity", included the totems of the team's First Nations players, including a barramundi to represent Spicer.

Spicer was delisted by North Melbourne in October 2023 after playing a total of 12 matches.

== Post-AFL career ==
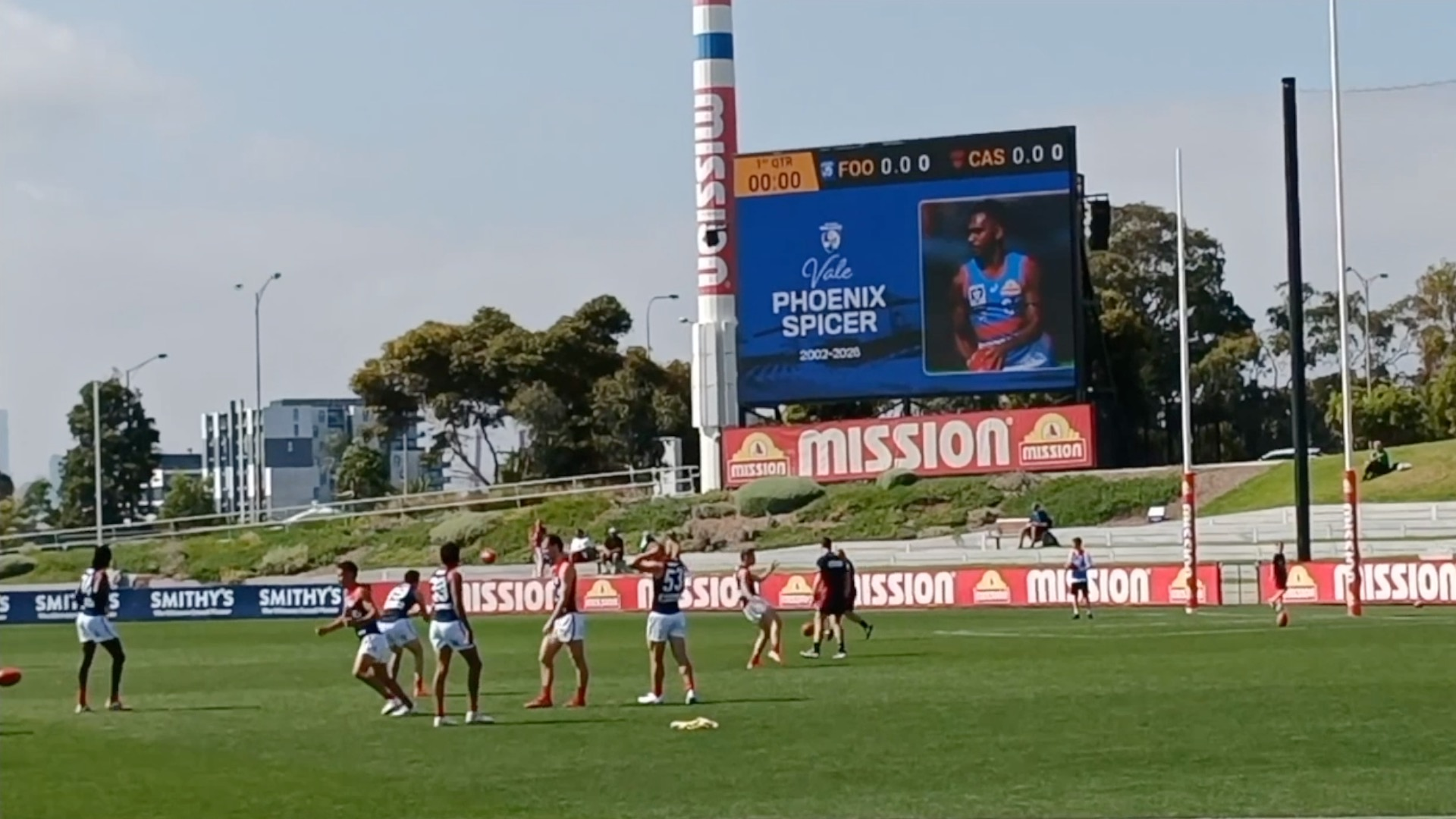
Footscray pays tribute to Spicer before round 1 of the 2026 VFL season

After being delisted, Spicer played for Darwin in the Northern Territory Football League (NTFL). He then joined Footscray, the Western Bulldogs' reserves team in the Victorian Football League (VFL), for the 2024 season.

Spicer was named in the VFL's state squad for their matches against the SANFL in both 2024 and 2025. He nominated for the 2025 mid-season rookie draft, but was not drafted. He was named as an emergency player for Footscray in the 2025 VFL Grand Final, in which Footscray defeated Southport.

Spicer died on 2 January 2026 at the age of 23 from a brain aneurysm. Footscray paid tribute to Spicer at Whitten Oval before the start of its round 1 match against Casey.

== Statistics ==
Updated to the end of the 2023 season.

Legend
| G | Goals | K | Kicks | D | Disposals | T | Tackles |
| B | Behinds | H | Handballs | M | Marks |

| Season | Team | No. | Games | Totals | | | | | | | Averages (per game) | | | | | | |
| Season | Team | No. | Games | G | B | K | H | D | M | T | G | B | K | H | D | M | T |
|---|---|---|---|---|---|---|---|---|---|---|---|---|---|---|---|---|---|
| 2021 | North Melbourne | 36 | 1 | 0 | 1 | 3 | 4 | 7 | 1 | 0 | 0.0 | 1.0 | 3.0 | 4.0 | 7.0 | 1.0 | 0.0 |
| 2022 | North Melbourne | 36 | 5 | 1 | 3 | 17 | 11 | 28 | 5 | 9 | 0.2 | 0.6 | 3.4 | 2.2 | 5.6 | 1.0 | 1.8 |
| 2023 | North Melbourne | 36 | 6 | 1 | 2 | 18 | 21 | 39 | 6 | 23 | 0.2 | 0.3 | 3.0 | 3.5 | 6.5 | 1.0 | 3.8 |
