= Hamilton Secondary College =

Location
- Adelaide, South Australia; Australia; 34.9979339°S 138.5584767°E

Information
- Type: Public
- Motto: Respect, Excellence, Integrity
- Established: 1958
- Principal: Peta Kourbelis
- Campus: Urban
- Colours: Navy blue, white and gold
- Website: www.hamcoll.sa.edu.au

Hamilton Secondary College (formerly Mitchell Park Boys Technical College) resides in Mitchell Park, a suburb of Adelaide, South Australia. The school provides secondary education from year 7 to 12 and a Disability Unit. Hamilton Secondary College offers learning in all areas of the mandated curriculum, with comprehensive ICT, science and visual arts programs. The school is a lead school in the 'Trade Schools for the Future' program that enables students from Year 10 to gain practical skills for work while they are still at school. As such, the school offers 14 VET certificates, five of which are available to secondary students. The secondary campus consists of the middle school, Years 7 to 10, and the senior school, Years 11 to 12. Students with disabilities are catered for with individual programs within the purpose-built Hamilton Unit.

The school was established in 1958 as Mitchell Park Boys Technical High School and became co-educational in 1972. The amalgamation of Glengowrie High School and Mitchell Park Boys Technical College in 1991 prompted the school to be renamed Hamilton, after the Hamilton family, prominent winegrowers in the area.

Hamilton Secondary College participates in the international space school program, with a A$5m facility including a 40m room with a simulated Martian crater and landscape for conducting role-playing space scenarios, and has close links with the United States Space Program. Each year, students from Hamilton and other schools are involved in a series of activities led by the Space School Manager.

In November 2021 the school opened a new building and revamped several other buildings to allow for incoming students, including those involved in the transition of year 7 students from primary to secondary schools. In February 2022, the Hamilton Unit underwent renovations to allow for a greater range of disabilities and a greater number of year 7 students entering schooling at Hamilton. As part of the redevelopment the school received a new canteen, and a planetarium as part of the space school. It also received a new performing arts centre with a stage with seating for about 150.

The school offers the renowned Media Arts Production School. In a 1999 article written by Bronwyn Hurrell and published in The Advertiser, Professor Julie James Bailey, author of Reel Women: Working in Film and Television and former Professor of Film and Media at Griffith University, says she 'came across the media course at Hamilton Secondary College and was extremely impressed,' pointing out that ‘It’s the only (course) that feeds into the commercial TV stations having some knowledge of equipment. It’s the only course I’m aware of in the whole of Australia.’

== Notable alumni ==
- Joel Porter, former football (soccer) player
- Phoenix Spicer, Australian rules football player (North Melbourne)
