= Bala Murugan Temple =

Hindu place of worship in Perth, Western Australia

- பால முருகன் கோயில்
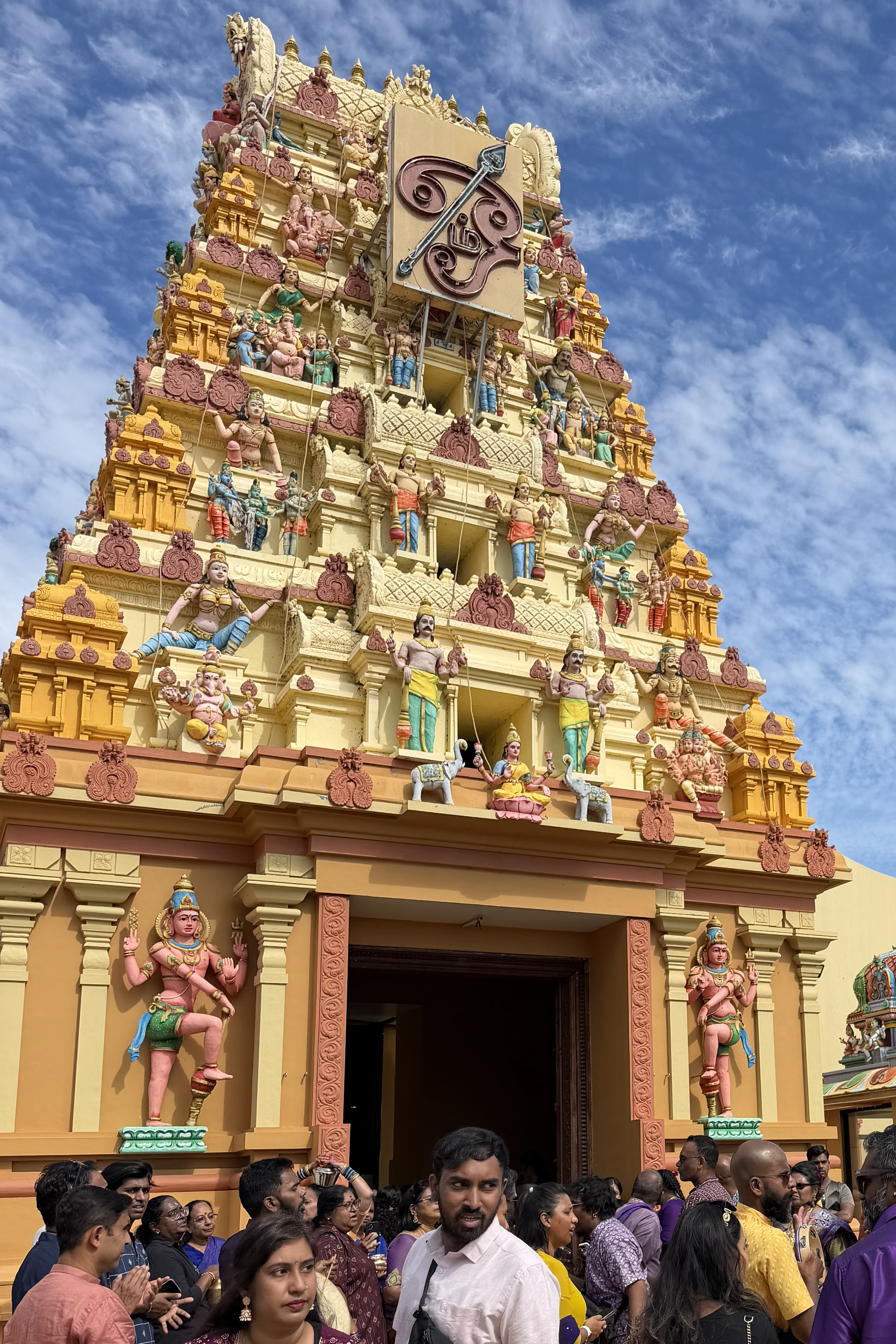
- Temple gopuram

Religion
- Affiliation: Hinduism
- Deity: Murugan
- Festivals: Thaipusam, Shasti Tithi, Panguni Uthiram
- Status: Active

Location
- Location: 12 Mandogalup Rd, Mandogalup WA 6167
- State: Western Australia
- Country: Australia
- Interactive map of Bala Murugan Temple
- Coordinates: 32°12′23″S 115°50′44″E

Architecture
- Type: Dravidian architecture
- Groundbreaking: 1996; 30 years ago
- Completed: 2008; 18 years ago
- Direction of façade: East

Website
- www.perthmurugan.org.au

Bala Murugan Temple (Tamil: பெர்த் பாலமுருகன் கோவில்) is a Hindu temple in Mandogalup, a suburb of Perth, Western Australia. Dedicated to the Hindu god Murugan, the temple is run by volunteers. Groundbreaking took place in 1996, and the Bala Murugan Temple was completed and opened to the public in 2008 on 11 May, the day the first Kumbhabhishekham (consecration) took place.

== See also ==
- Hinduism in Australia
