= Perth Shiva Temple =

Hindu place of worship in Perth, Western Australia

- பெர்த் சிவன் கோவில்
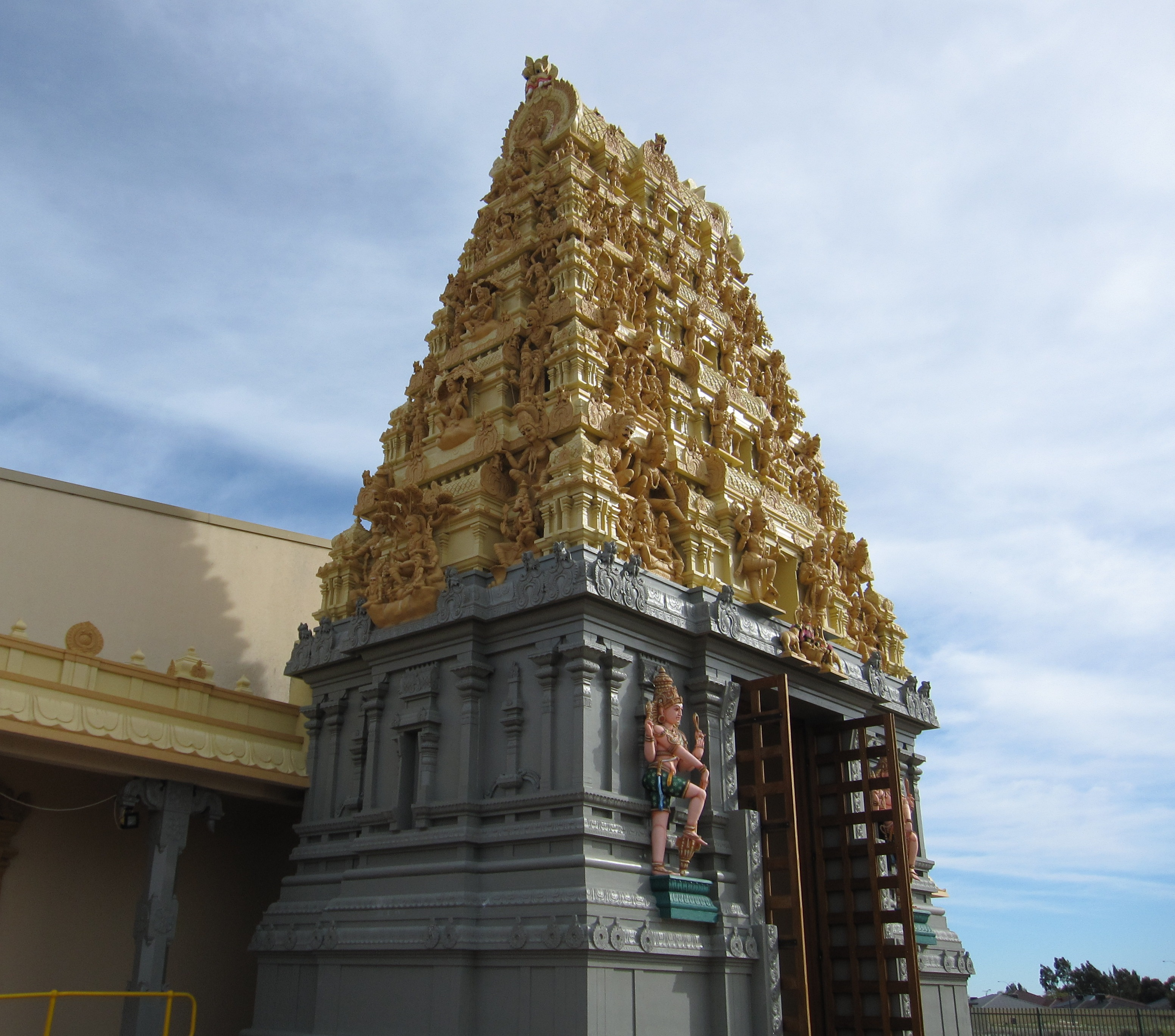
- Perth Shiva Temple gopuram

- Location within Perth

Religion
- Affiliation: Hinduism
- Deity: Shiva and Meenakshi
- Festivals: Maha Shivaratri, Pradosham
- Status: Active

Location
- Location: 271 Warton Road, Canning Vale WA 6155
- State: Western Australia
- Country: Australia
- Coordinates: 32°05′00.1″S 115°56′58.6″E

Architecture
- Type: Dravidian architecture
- Groundbreaking: 1990; 36 years ago
- Completed: 1991; 35 years ago
- Direction of façade: East

Website
- hindu.org.au

The Perth Shiva Temple (Tamil: பெர்த் சிவன் கோவில்), officially the Perth Hindu Temple, is a Hindu temple in Canning Vale, in Perth, Western Australia, dedicated to the god Shiva and his consort, the goddess Meenakshi. The temple is run by the Shri Shiva Devasthanam, a non-profit religious organisation, and was completed in the early 1990s. It is the oldest Hindu temple in Western Australia.

== History ==
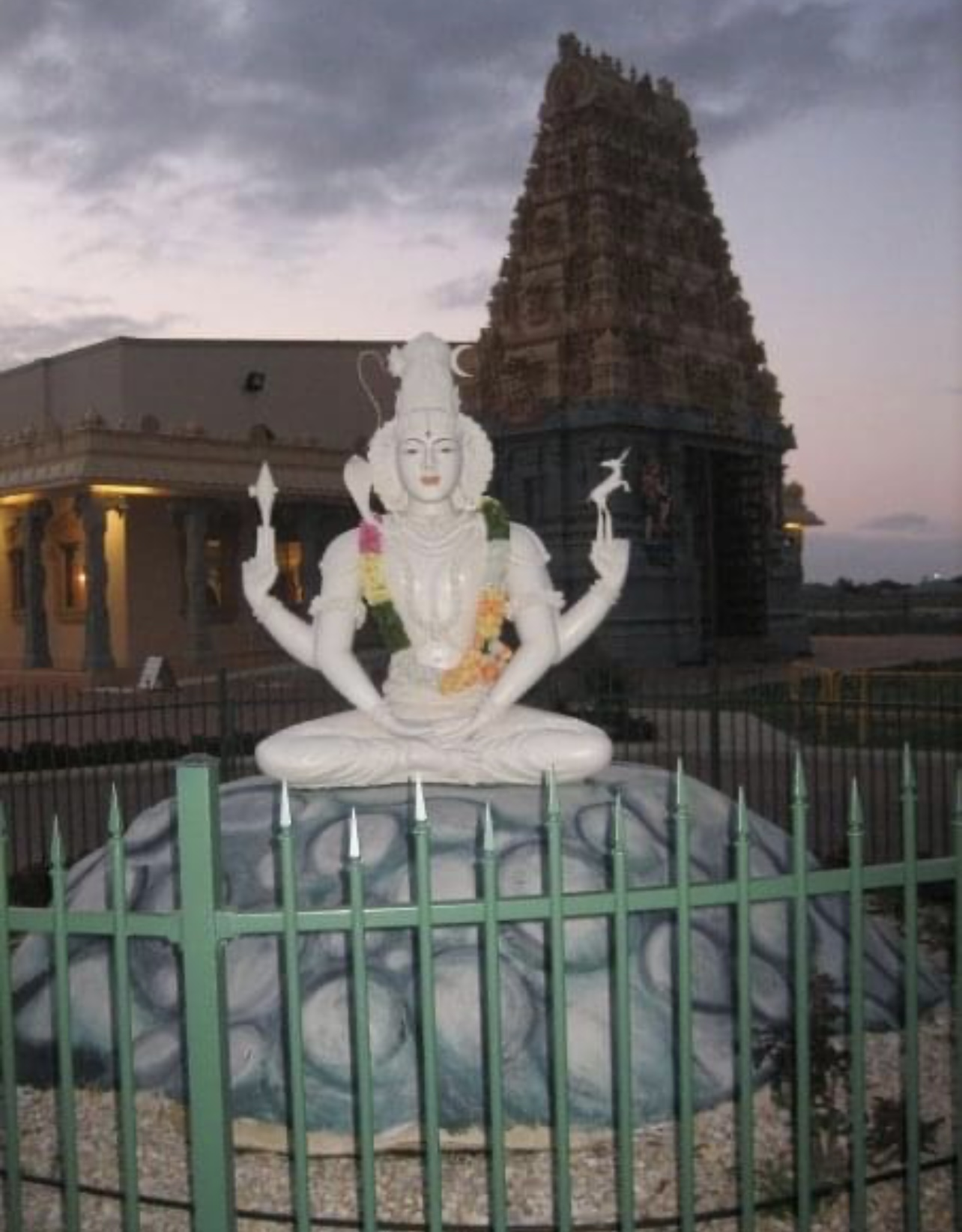
Statue of the god Shiva at the entrance of the temple

Plans for a Hindu temple in Perth began in 1985. The land was consecrated in 1987 by Swami Shantanand Saraswati and construction was completed and the murtis were installed in February 1990. It is the oldest Hindu temple in Western Australia; another temple has also been built in Perth by Tamil Hindus. The Shiva Temple's construction, including a final Royal Tower (for which the Perth City Council contributed over US$600,000) took over 20 years and was completed in June 2008.

In May 2022, in the lead-up to Australia's national elections, both major parties promised donations of A$1 million towards the development of the temple.

== Deities inside the Temple ==
- Shiva (Main God)
- Meenakshi (Main Goddess) (referred to as Devi in the temple)
- Ganesha
- Murugan
- Durga
- Navagraha
- Bhairava
- Hanuman
- Vishnu
- Lakshmi
- Athma Lingam

== Festivals and events ==
The temple priests perform pujas to specific gods and goddesses. In addition, festivals celebrated at the temple include the following:

=== Maha Shivaratri ===
During Maha Shivaratri, the temple is open for an entire day and night of fasting and meditation in honour of the god Shiva.

=== Purattasi ===
Purattasi is a Hindu month celebrating Perumal (an avatar of Vishnu), with prayers and a vegetarian feast each Saturday.

=== Pradosham ===
Pradosham involves bimonthly prayers to Shiva during the three hours surrounding sunset on the thirteenth day of every fortnight in the Hindu calendar, with an hour-long mantra sung in the temple.

== See also ==
- Hinduism in Australia
