= Sydney Durga Temple =

Hindu temple in Australia

Sydney Shri Durga Temple
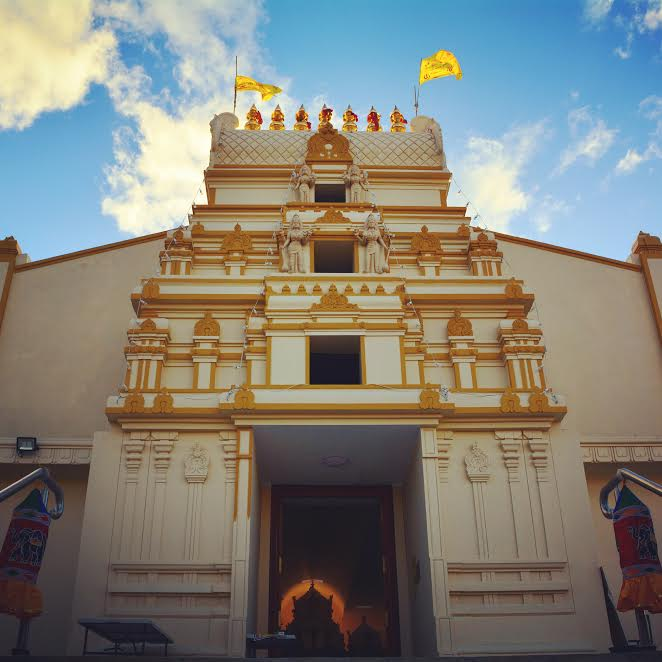
- Sydney Durga Temple Gopuram

Religion
- Affiliation: Hinduism
- Deity: Durga
- Festivals: Maha Kumbabishekam, Annual Festival, Navarathri

Location
- Location: 21–23 Rose Crescent, Regents Park
- State: New South Wales
- Country: Australia
- Interactive map of Sydney Shri Durga Temple
- Coordinates: 33°52′50″S 151°01′05″E

Architecture
- Type: Dravidian architecture
- Completed: 2017

Website
- sydneydurga.org

The Sydney Shri Durga Temple, commonly known as Sydney Durga Temple, is a Hindu temple at 21–23 Rose Crescent, Regents Park, New South Wales 2143, in Sydney. The temple is run by the Shri Durgadevi Devasthanam, a non-profit religious organisation. The temple is dedicated to the goddesses Durga, Lakshmi and Saraswati who are its three main deities and the temple celebrated its first Maha Kumbabhishekam on 7 May 2017.

== The Shri Durgadevi Devasthanam ==
In October 2002, the Sri Durgadevi Devasthanam was established to promote Hindu religion and culture in Sydney. The main objectives of the Devasthanam are to worship the goddess Durga, promote Hinduism and help disadvantaged people. The organisation aims to impart religious, educational and cultural values of Hinduism to its community and future generations.

== History of the temple ==
When the temple began, weekly puja services were held at Homebush High School each Friday. The Sri Durgadevi Devasthanam Sydney Inc was registered as a charity organisation.

In 2005, the Shri Durgadevi Devasthanam paid a deposit of $2.05 million to secure a one-acre site at 21–23 Rose Crescent, Regents Park. The foundation ceremony was performed in August 2006. Following construction of a temporary prayer hall in late 2006, the three deities were moved to the temple land during an inauguration ceremony.

The second stage of construction commenced in August 2009 and involved building a wedding hall (auditorium) and an educational hall. The auditorium cost $1.85 million and has a ceiling height of 6 metres. It was completed in 2010 and has been described as the first Hindu community hall within a temple complex in Australia.

Interior of Sydney Durga Temple
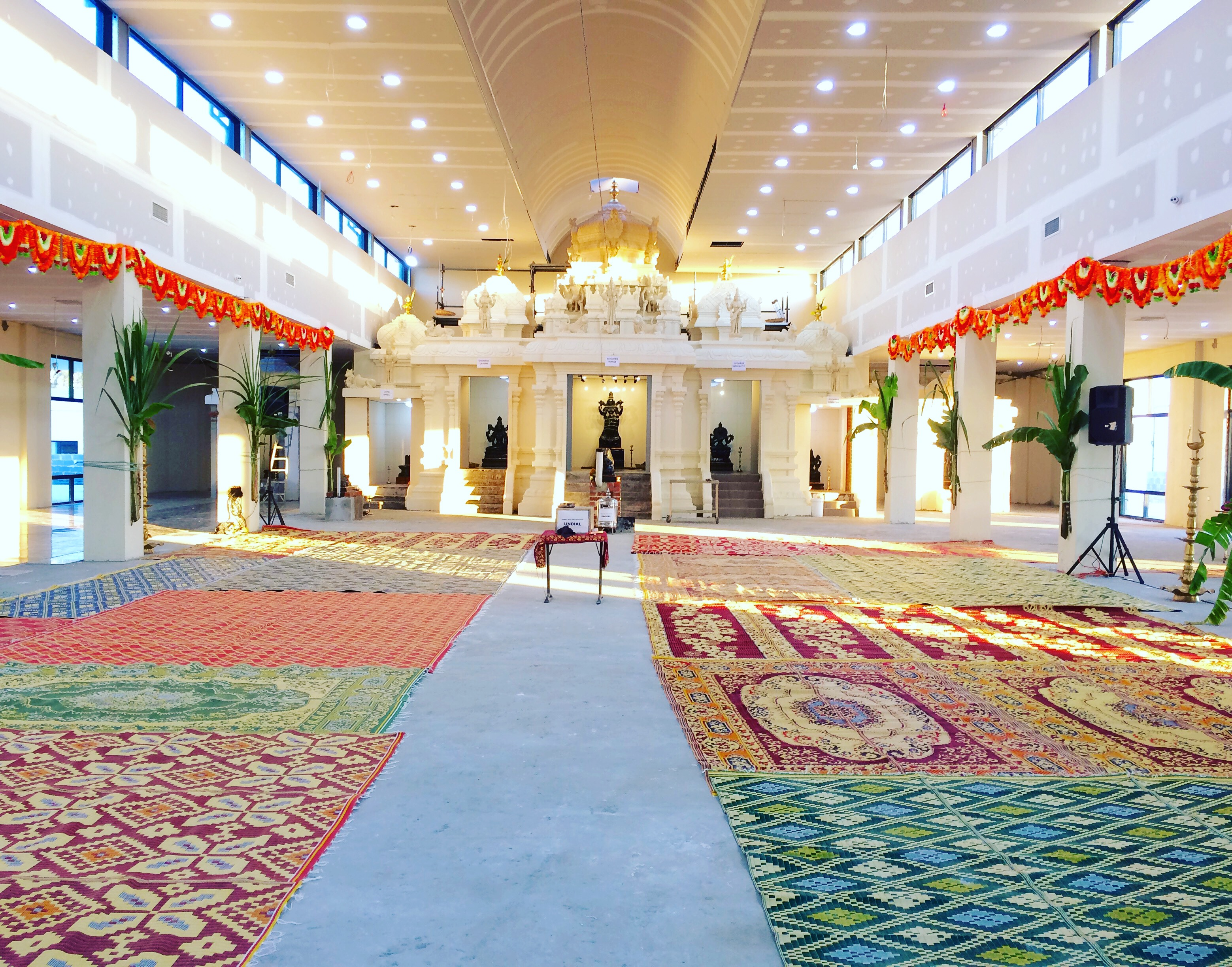
- The 5 main sancta

Religion
- Affiliation: Hinduism

Location
- Interactive map of Interior of Sydney Durga Temple

The temple complex has three levels: a basement with the wedding and educational halls; a ground level with the entrance and main car park; and an upper level with the main temple above the car park. The completed temple held its first Maha Kumbabhishekam (consecration ceremony) on 7 May 2017, when the new complex opened to the public for worship.

== First consecration ceremony ==
The first Maha Kumbabhishekam (Consecration Ceremony) at Sydney Durga Temple took place on 7 May 2017. The Rajagopura Maha Kumbabhishekam began at 10:00 am, followed by consecration rites for the temple's shrines. The Kumbabishekam was witnessed by approximately 5000 devotees and was a majestic milestone for the temple and its dedicated committee members.

The Yaagasaalai prayers commenced on 30 April 2017 and continued for eight days, with a special puja conducted until 7 May. The Ashta Banthana Marunthu Thaila Kappu (in which devotees apply oil) took place from 5 to 7 May 2017.

The Mandalabishegam was held for 45 consecutive days after the Maha Kumbabhishekam, from 8 May to 21 June 2017.

Maha Kumbabishekam Attendees
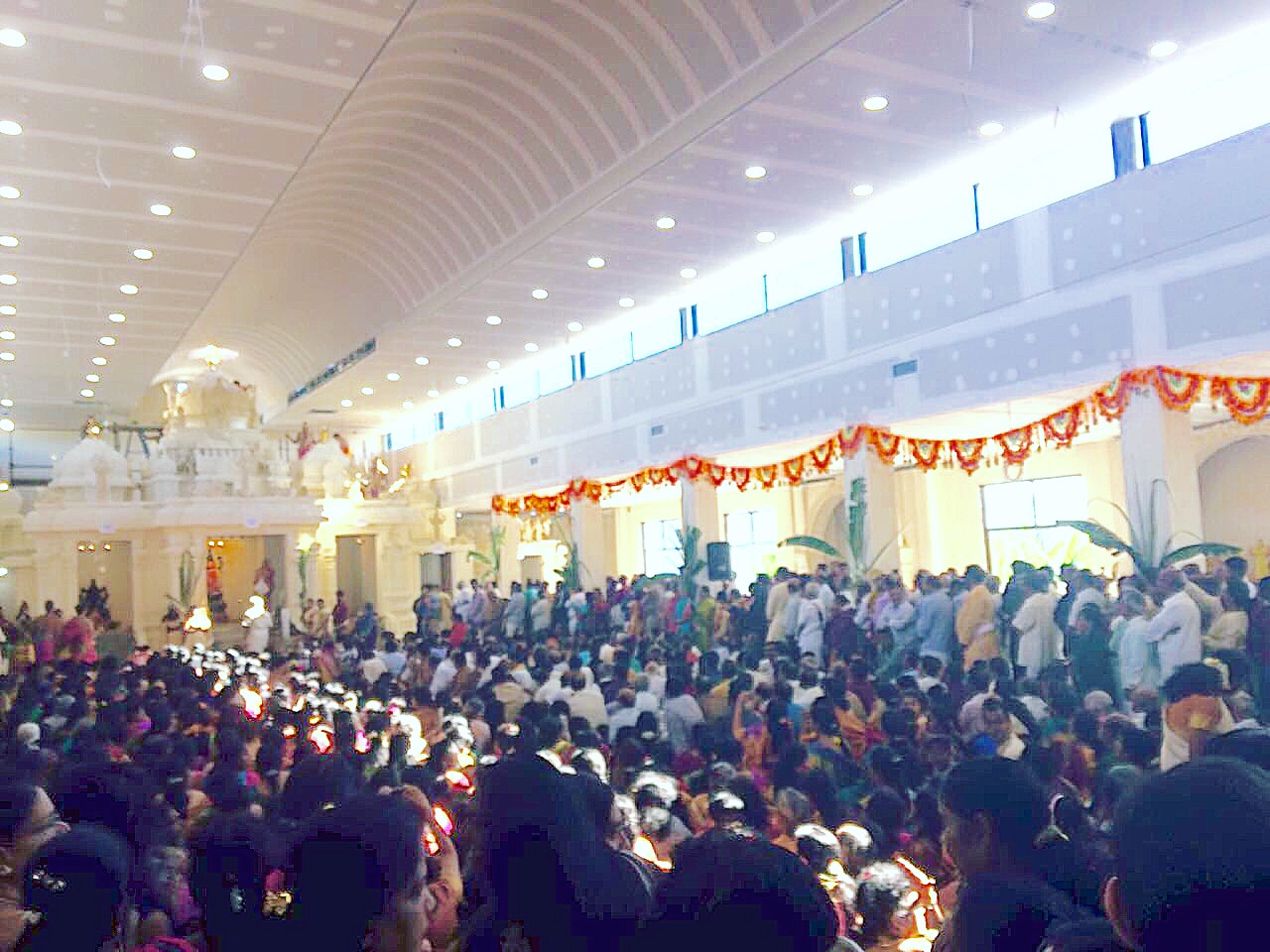
- 5000 Kumbabishekam Attendees

Religion
- Affiliation: Hinduism

Location
- Interactive map of Maha Kumbabishekam Attendees

== Temple deities ==
The main deities of the temple are goddesses Durga, Goddess Lakshmi and Goddess Saraswati. The following deities also have shrines in the temple: Lord Ganesha (Vinayagar), Lord Shiva, Lord Krishna, Lord Murugan, Goddess Visalaatshi and Nandi. The temple also has a ceremonial flagpole (kodi maram), a pedestal for sacrificial offerings (balipeetam) and shrines (sannidhi) for Ashta Lakshmi, Navagraham and Bhairava.

Sydney Durga Temple Main Deity
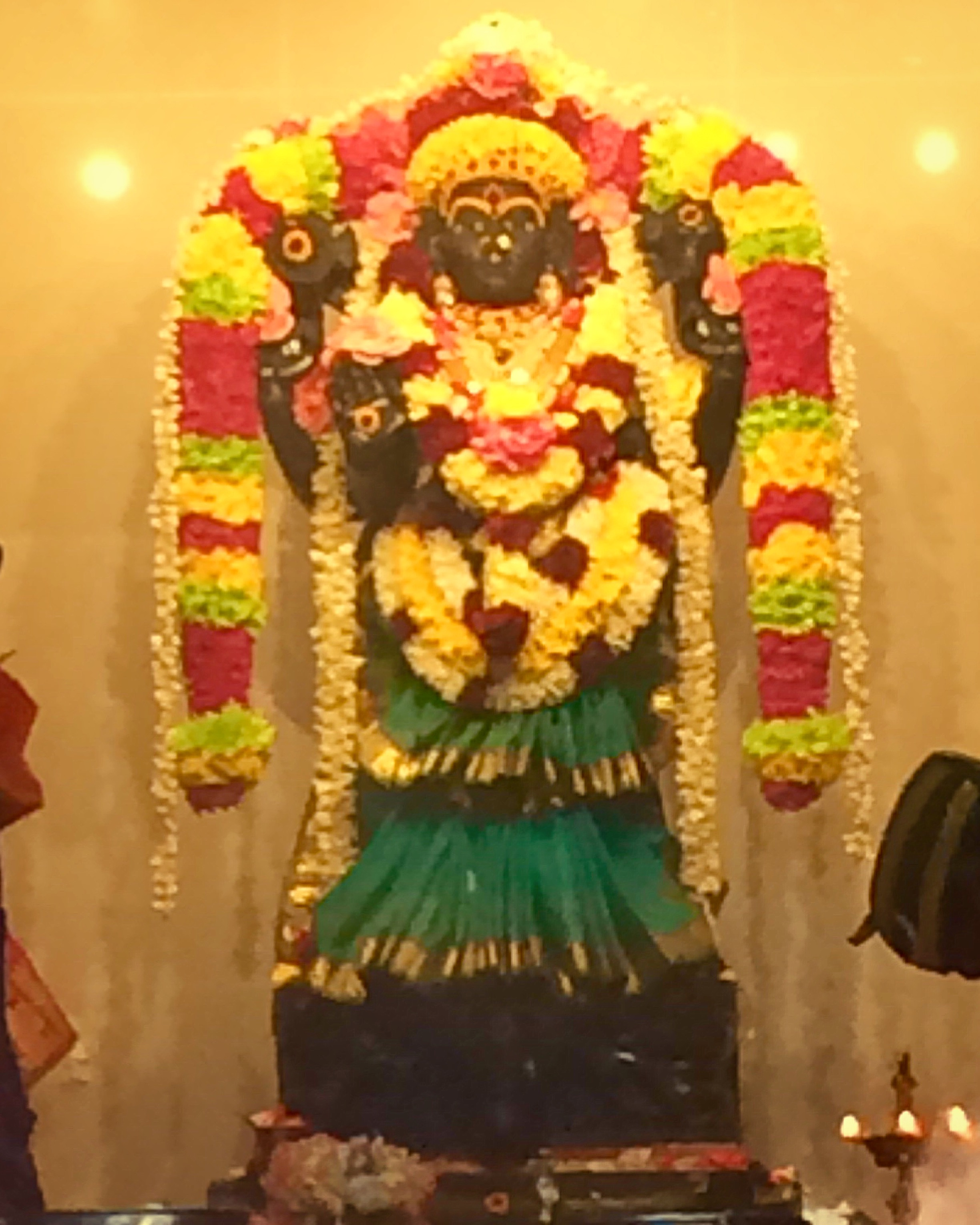
- Main Deity (Durga)

Religion
- Affiliation: Hinduism

Location
- Interactive map of Sydney Durga Temple Main Deity

== Facilities ==
Wedding Hall
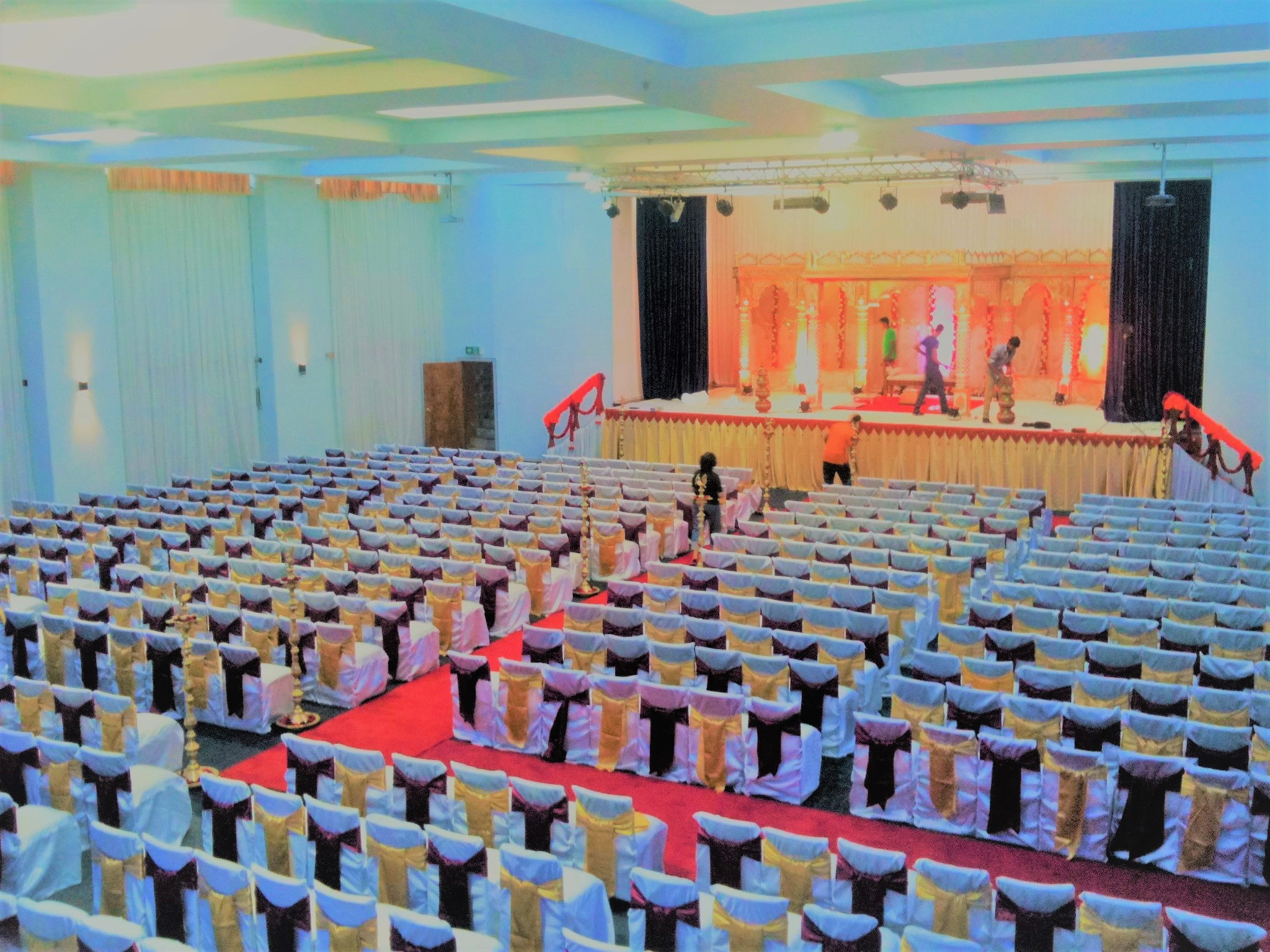
- 800 seating capacity Wedding Hall

Religion
- Affiliation: Hinduism

Location
- Interactive map of Wedding Hall

- Wedding hall

The Sydney Durga Temple Wedding Hall is an 800-seat auditorium that hosts cultural performances, weddings, functions, conferences, musical and dance performances, celebrations and the temple's annual fundraising dinner. The Devasthanam constructed the auditorium at a cost of more than $1 million. The auditorium provides projectors, seating, tables, lighting and backdrops. Facilities include men's and women's restrooms, rooms beside the stage, a kitchenette, a sound room and two larger dressing rooms. Bookings, packages and deals can be made by calling the temple. It has been described as the first Hindu community hall within a temple complex in Australia.

- Educational hall

Adjacent to the Durga Auditorium is a smaller Educational Hall. It has theatre-style seating for 400 and has been used for functions, dinners, weddings and celebrations. It uses the same facilities as the Wedding Hall.

== Festivals and events ==
=== Annual festival (Maasi Magam Theertha Utsavam) ===
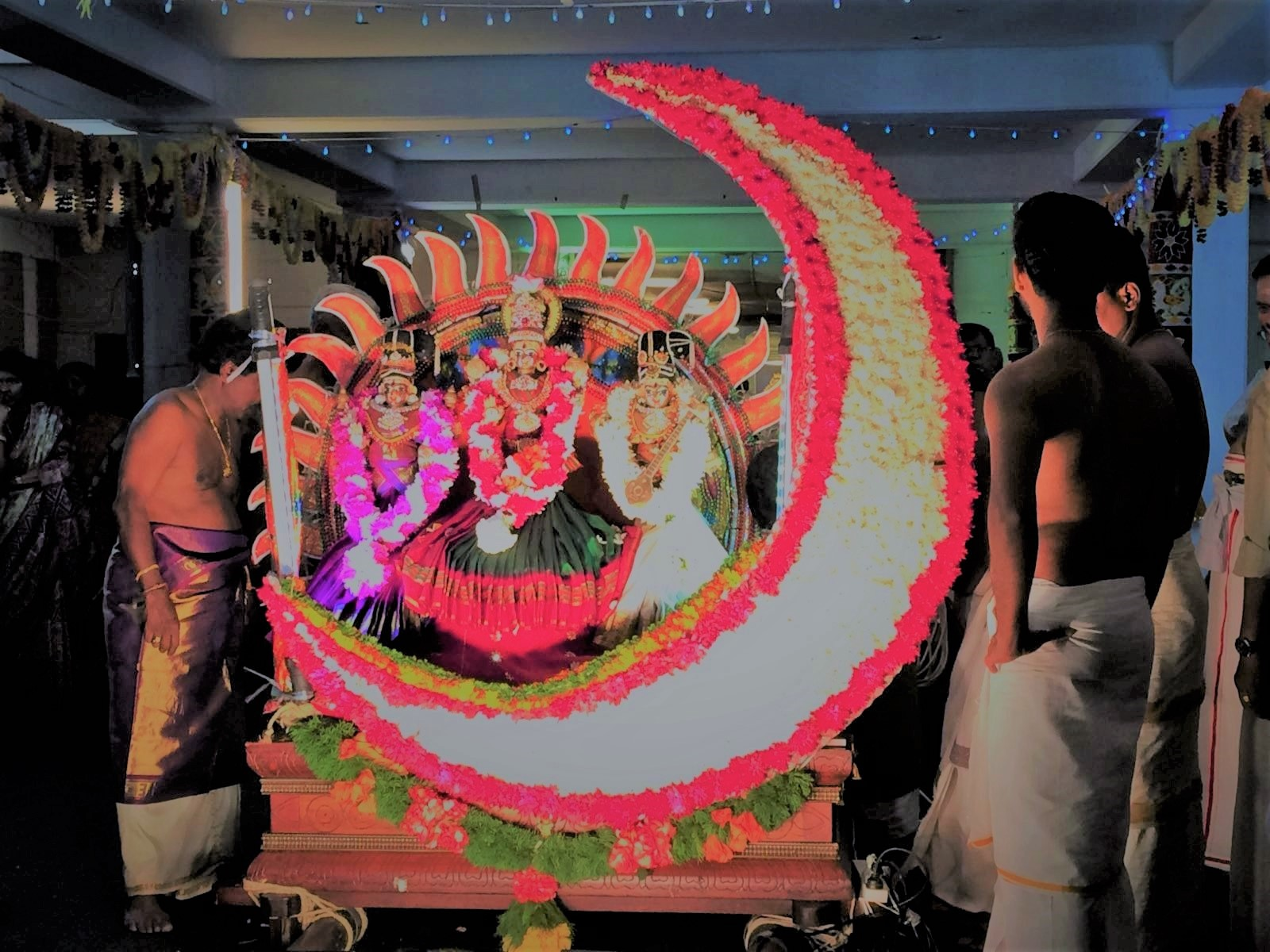
Annual Festival 2016

The Sydney Durga Temple's biggest festival is its annual festival. Over a period of 12 days, devotees come to the temple to receive blessings from Goddess Durga and witness special pujas, bhajans and cultural programmes. Every day during the 12 days, deities are carried around the temple on a decorated Pallakku with musical accompaniment from the Thavil and Nadaswaram.

=== Navarathri ===
Navarathri is a Hindu festival celebrated in honour of the divine goddess Durga during the Hindu calendar month of Ashvin (which typically falls in the months of September and October). During Navarathri, the temple conducts special pujas and hosts classical performances.

=== Temple annual fundraising dinner (aka dinner with entertainment) ===
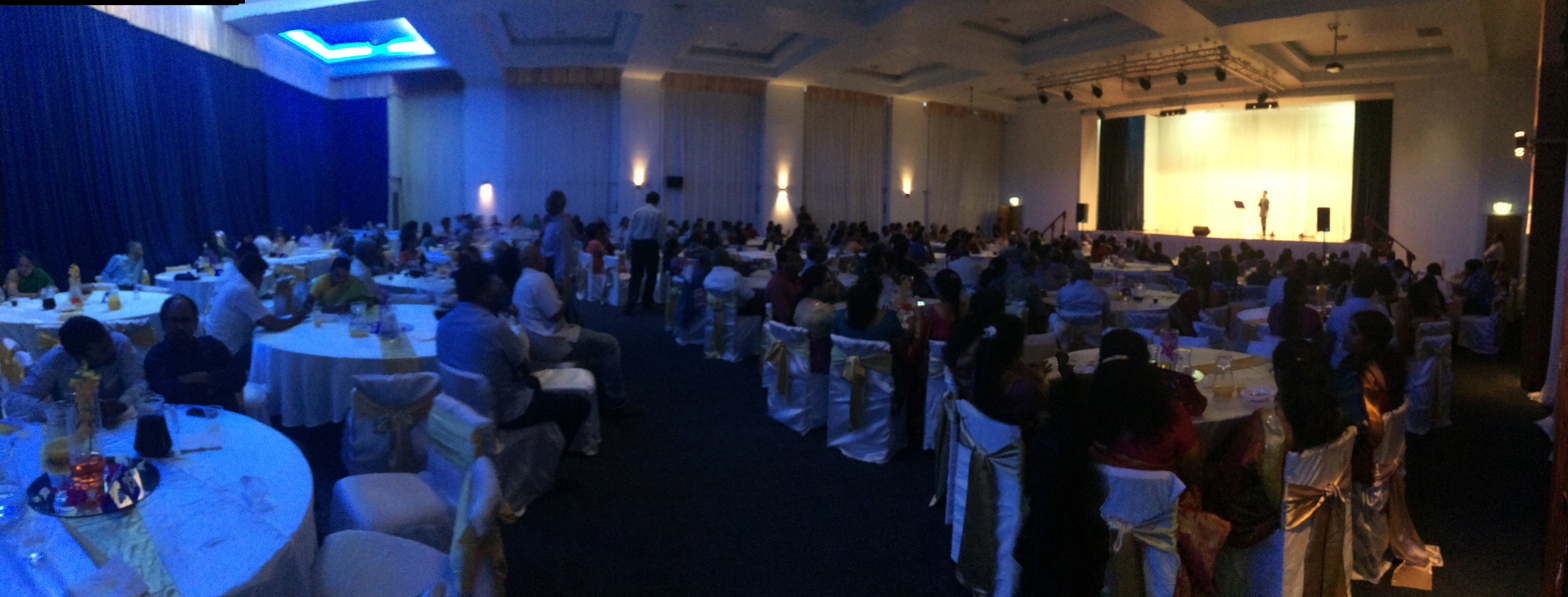
Temple Fundraising Dinner 2016

The Sydney Shri Durga Devasthanam annually hosts a temple fundraising dinner. The aim of the dinner is to raise funds for temple construction. The Dinner with Entertainment includes speeches from committee members, a variety of dance and vocal performances and auctions, followed by a delicious feast made by the volunteers of the cooking department in the temple. The dinner, without doubt, is always a success and is fun to attend. A ticket cost $20 which can be paid at the temple.

== The temple management committee ==
Members elect a management committee of nine members annually under the organisation's constitution. Currently, the Devasthanam has 124 fully paid members and 94 associate members.

For 2021, the management committee comprised Ratnam M. Mahendran (President), Sathy Surendran (Secretary), Mr. Mahalingam Sasseendran (Treasurer), Mr Kiru. Kiruparajah (Joint Secretary), Mr. Maheswaran, Mr. Shan Kumaralingam (Kumbabishekam Co-Coordinator), Mr Sivananthan, Mr Panchacharam and Mrs Ramana Kumaralingam.

The committee is elected by members at the annual general meeting.
