= Mandapa =

Sanskrit term for a pillard hall or pavilion

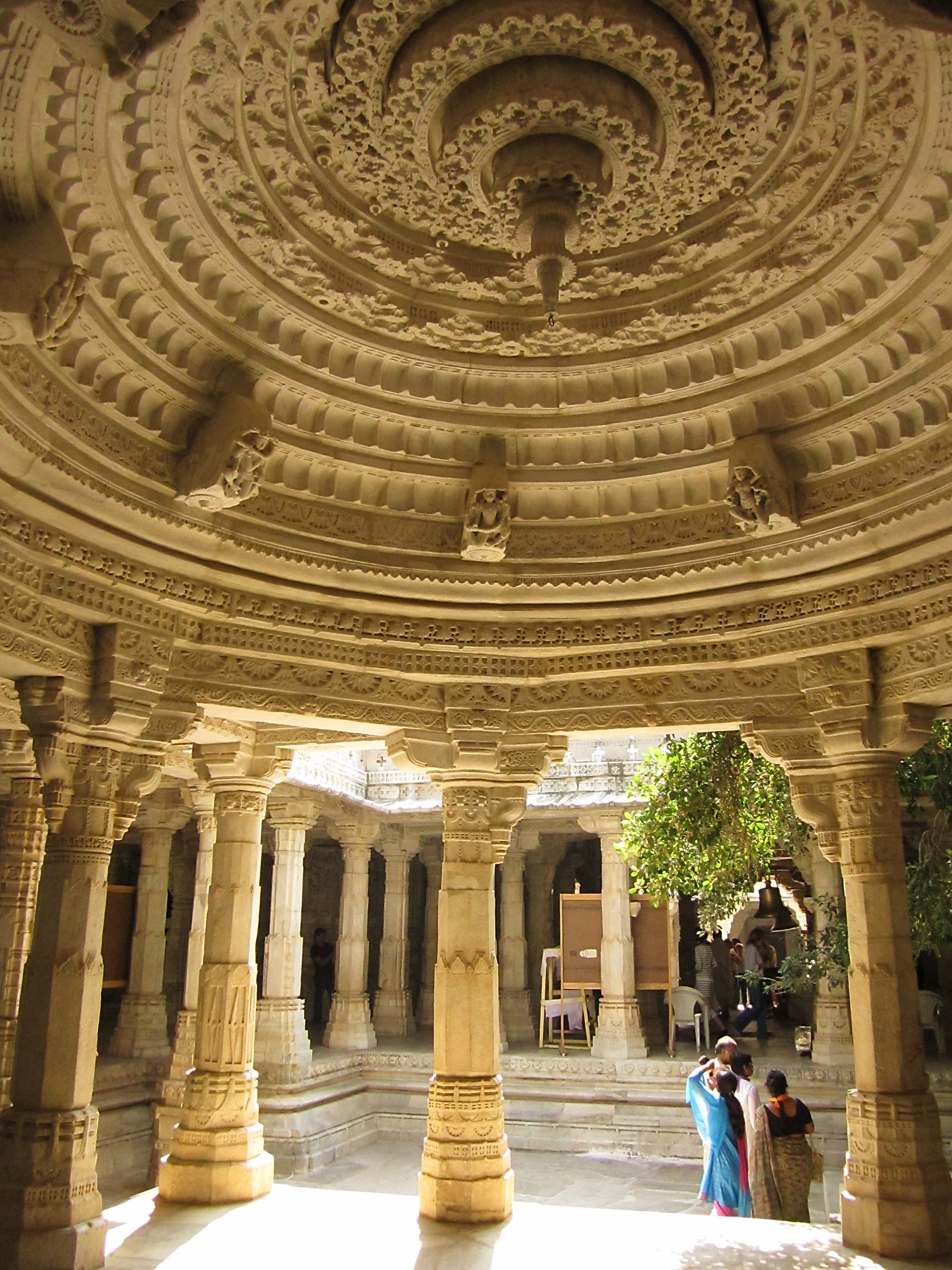
Open mandapa with pillars and courtyard.

A mandapa or mantapa (Sanskrit: मण्डप, romanized: maṇḍapa) is a pillared hall or pavilion for public rituals in Indian architecture and Nepalese pagoda design, especially featured in Hindu temple architecture and Jain temple architecture.

Mandapas are described as "open" or "closed" depending on whether they have walls or inner ceiling of pagoda. In temples, one or more mandapas very often lie between the sanctuary and the temple entrance, on the same axis. In a large temple other mandapas may be placed to the sides, or detached within the temple compound.

== Temple architecture ==
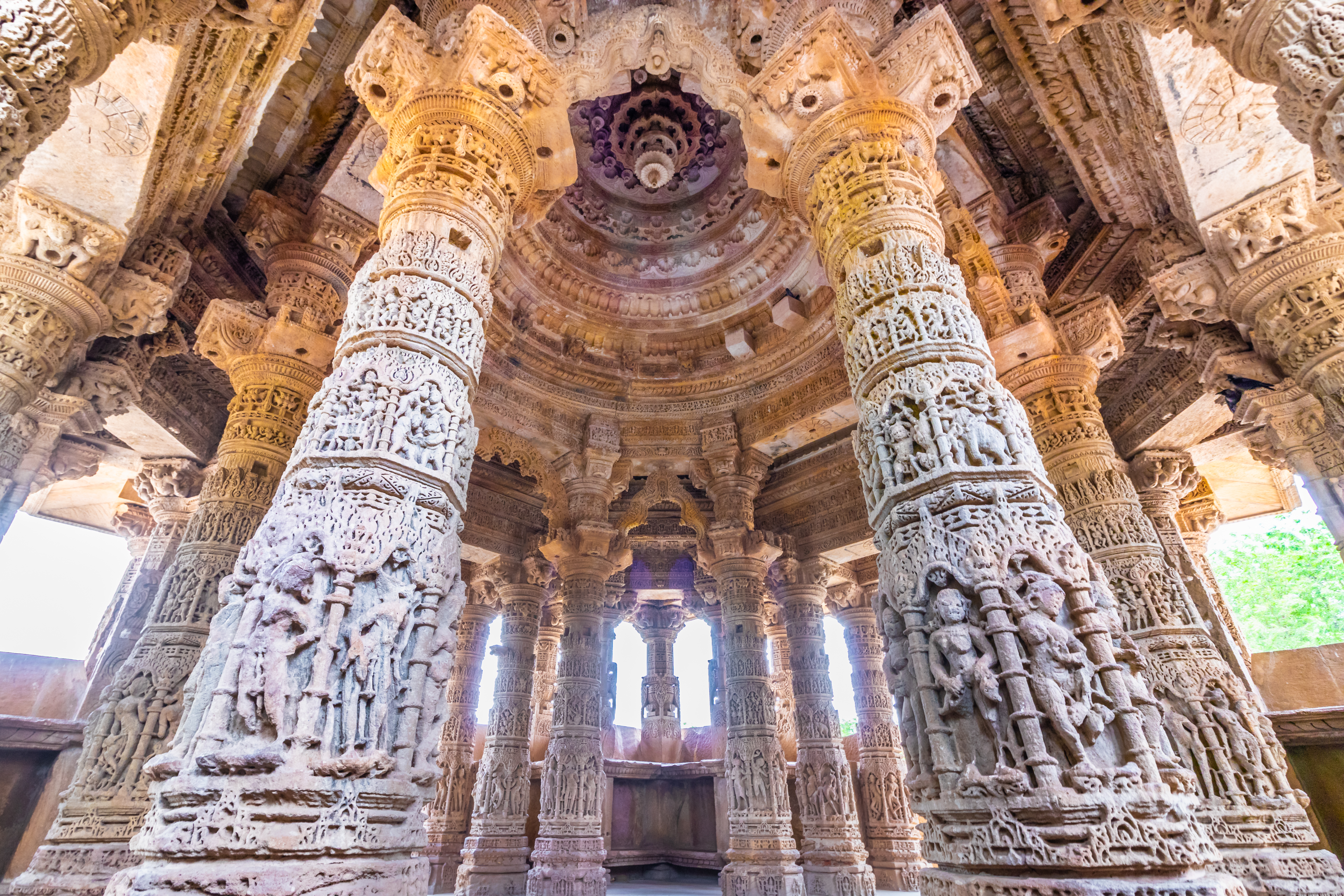
Sabha Mandapa built in the 11th century.

In the Hindu temple the mandapa is a porch-like structure through the (gopuram) (ornate gateway) and leading to the temple. It is used for religious dancing and music and is part of the basic temple compound. The prayer hall was generally built in front of the temple's sanctum sanctorum (garbhagriha). A large temple would have many mandapa.

If a temple has more than one mandapa, each one is allocated for a different function and given a name to reflect its use. For example, a mandapa dedicated to divine marriage is referred to as a kalyana mandapa. Often the hall was pillared and the pillars adorned with intricate carvings. In contemporary terms, it also represents a structure within which a Hindu wedding is performed. The bride and groom encircle a holy fire lit by the officiating priest in the center of the mandapa.

== Classifications ==
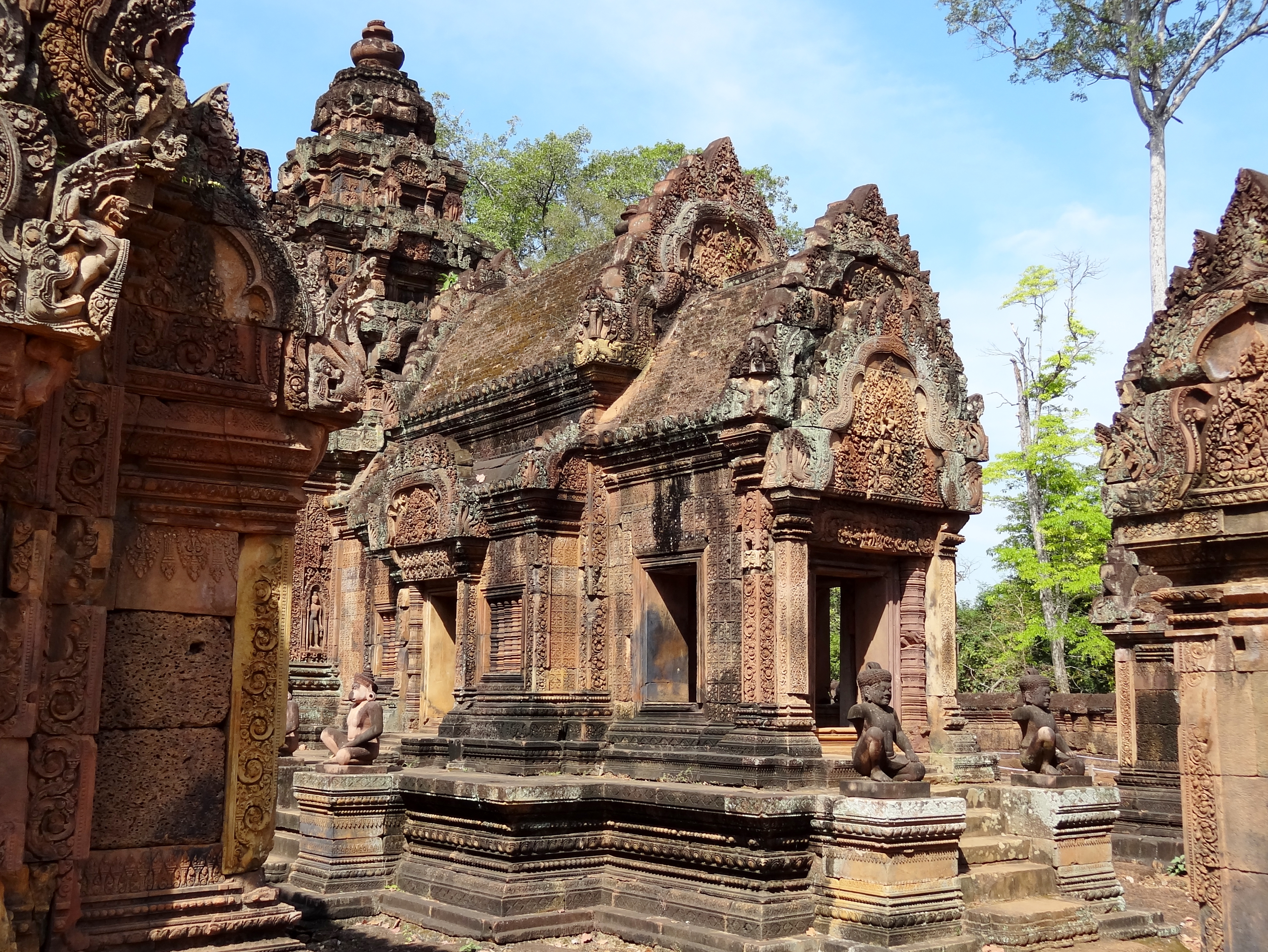
Mandapa of the central shrine of Banteay Srei temple, Cambodia

When a temple has more than one mandapa, they are given different names.

- Artha Mandapam or Ardh Mandapam – intermediary space between the temple exterior and the sanctum sanctorum or the other mandapa of the temple
- Asthana Mandapam – assembly hall
- Kalyana Mandapam – dedicated to ritual marriage celebration of the Lord with Goddess
- Maha Mandapam – (Maha=big) when there are several mandapa in the temple, it is the biggest and the tallest. It is used for conducting religious discourses. Sometimes, the maha mandapa is also built along a transversal axis with a transept (bumped-out portions along this transversal axis). At the exterior, the transept ends by a large window which brings light and freshness into the temple.
- Nandi Mandapam (or Nandi mandir) – in the Shiva temples, pavilion with a statue of the sacred bull Nandi, looking at the statue or the lingam of Shiva.
- Ranga Mandapa or rangamandapa – a larger mandapa, which can be used for dance or drama, with music
- Meghanath Mandapa
- Namaskara Mandapa
- Open Mandapa

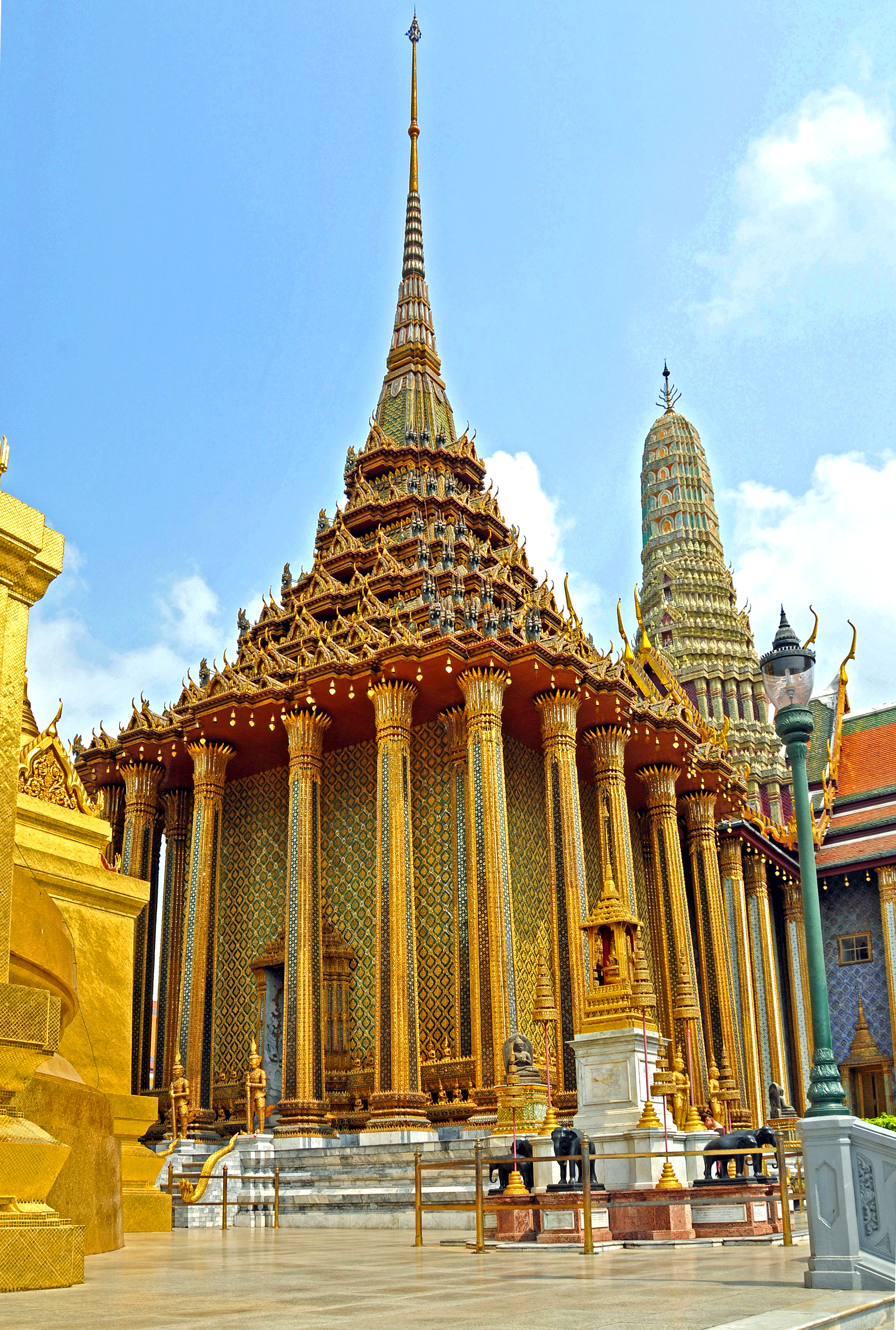
A Thai Buddhist Mandapa or Mondop, Wat Phra Kaew, Bangkok

== Nomenclature ==
In Burmese, the term mandap (မဏ္ဍပ်), which has etymological origins in Pali maṇḍapa, is an open platform or pavilion from which people spray water on passers-by during the Buddhist festival Thingyan.

In Javanese, the mandapa is known as a pendhapa (ꦥꦼꦤ꧀ꦝꦥ). Unusually, Indonesian pendopos are built mostly for Muslim communities. Many mosques follow the pendopo design, with a layered roof.

In Khmer, Mandapa is pronounced to be Mondup (មណ្ឌប), means pavilion. Khmer people often refer it as a small shrine with high crown-shaped like tower, decorated with exquisite ornaments in various styles. In Khmer temples during Angkor era, A Mandapa is generally attached to the central tower of a temple and lied longitudinally to one of each main direction.

In Tamil, this platform is the Aayiram Kaal Mandapam – a distinctly thousand pillared hall close to the vimana of the Koil which forms a distinct part of the site plan of classical Dravidian architecture.

In Thai, it is called a mondop (มณฑป). It features often in Thai temple art and architecture, either in the form of a Hor Trai (a temple library) or as an altar shrine such as the one in Wat Chiang Man in Chiang Mai.

== Gallery ==
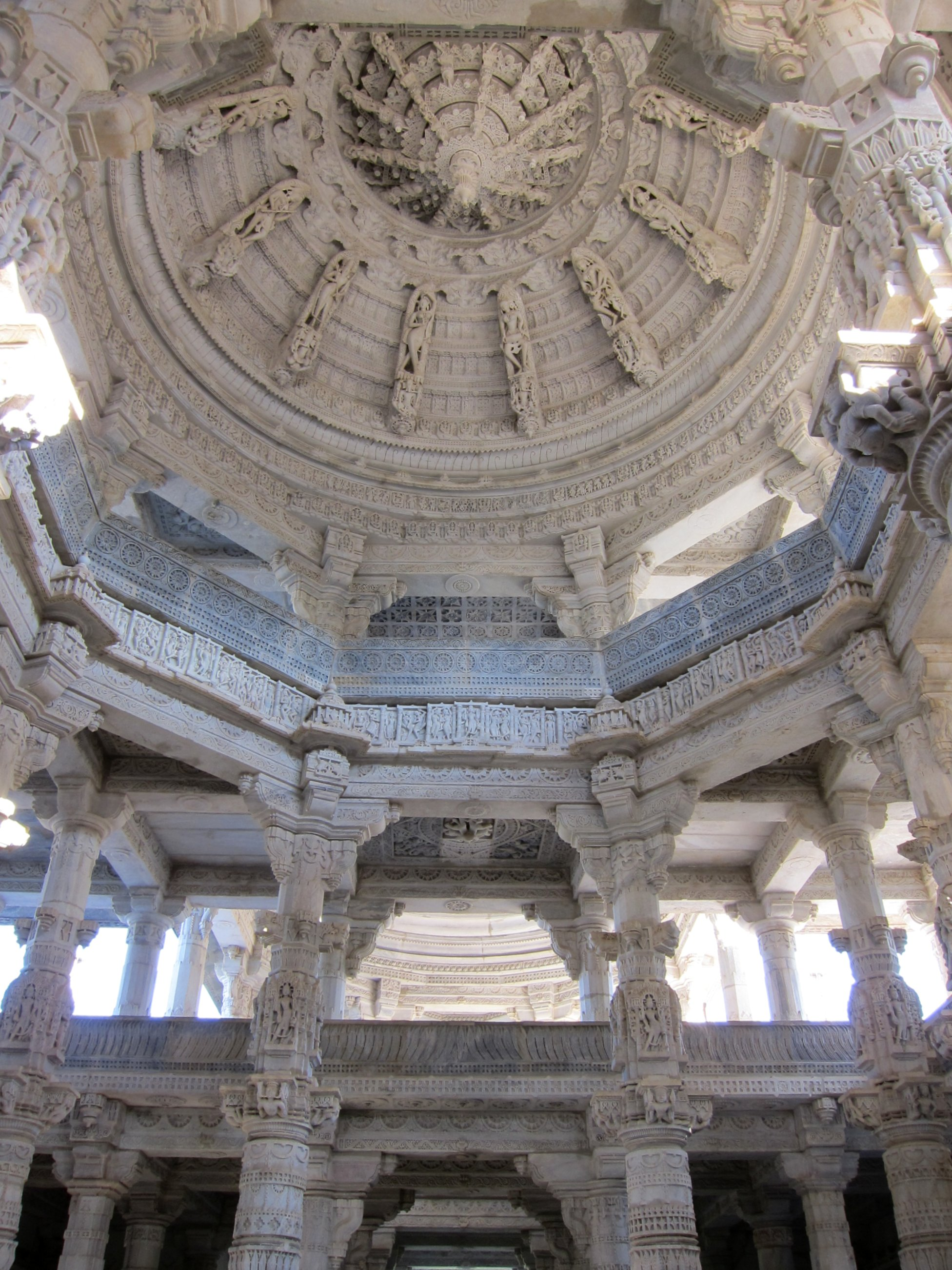
Mandapa interior and ceiling, Ranakpur Jain temple

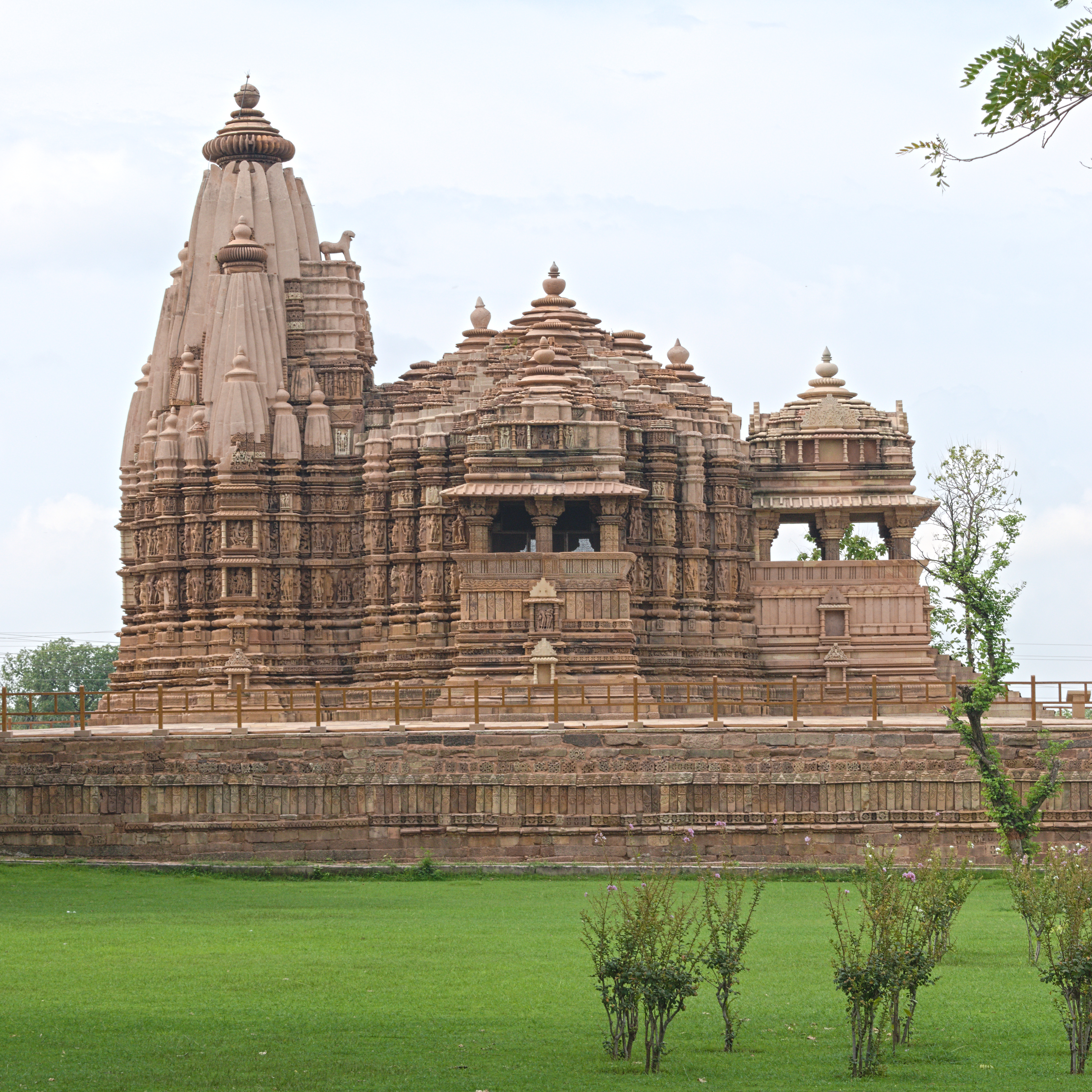
Chitragupta Temple, Khajuraho, 11th century, mantapas at the entrance.

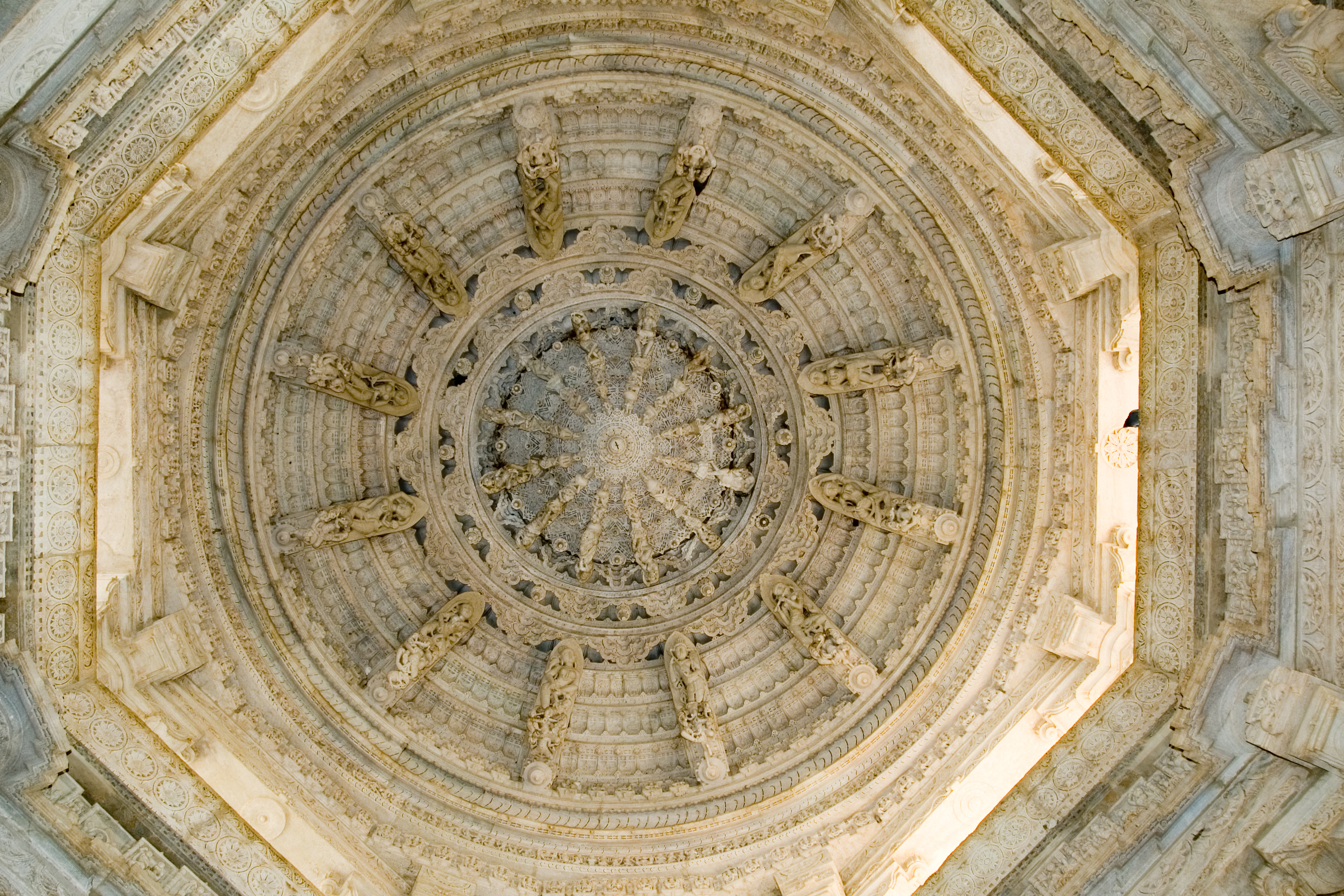
Mandapa interior ceiling, Ranakpur Jain temple

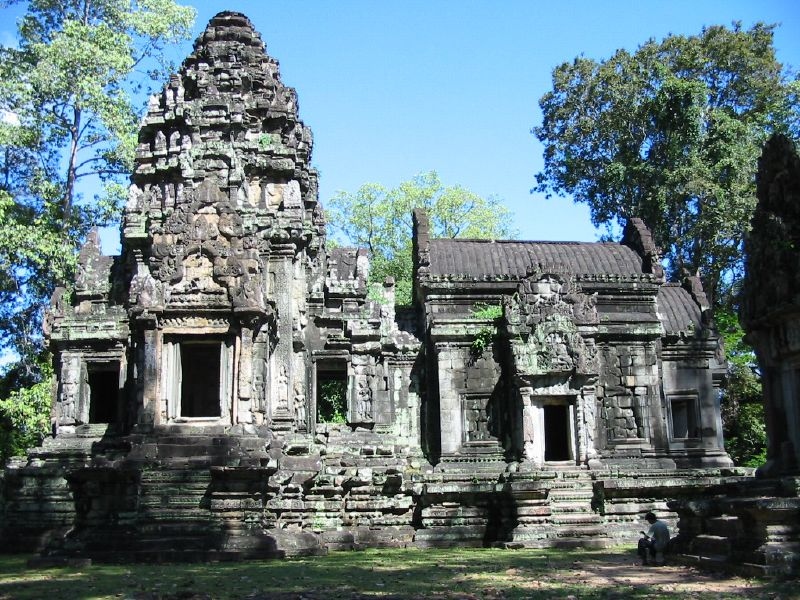
Madapa of Thommanon temple connected its main shrine tower, facing to the east, Cambodia

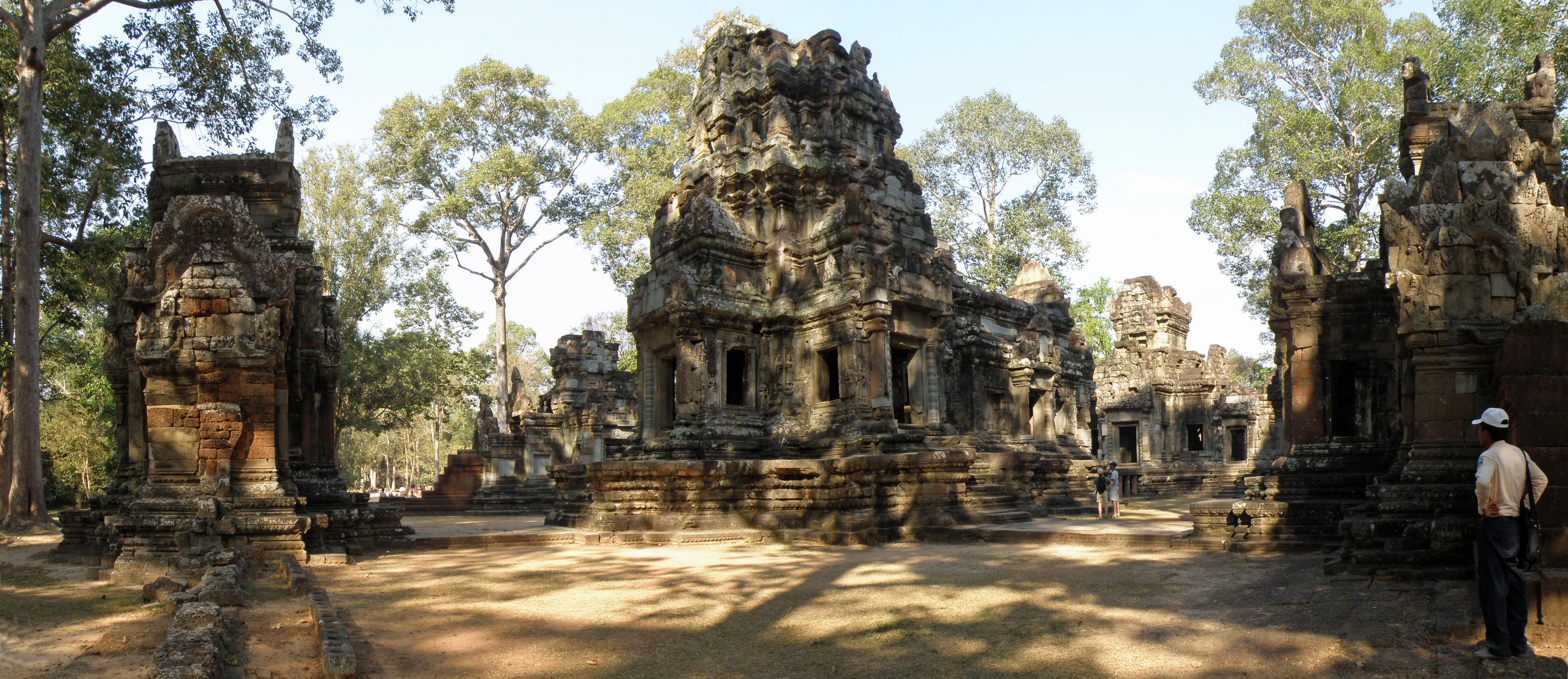
Chau Say Tevoda's mandapa and main tower enclosed by its wall and 4 gopuras, Cambodia

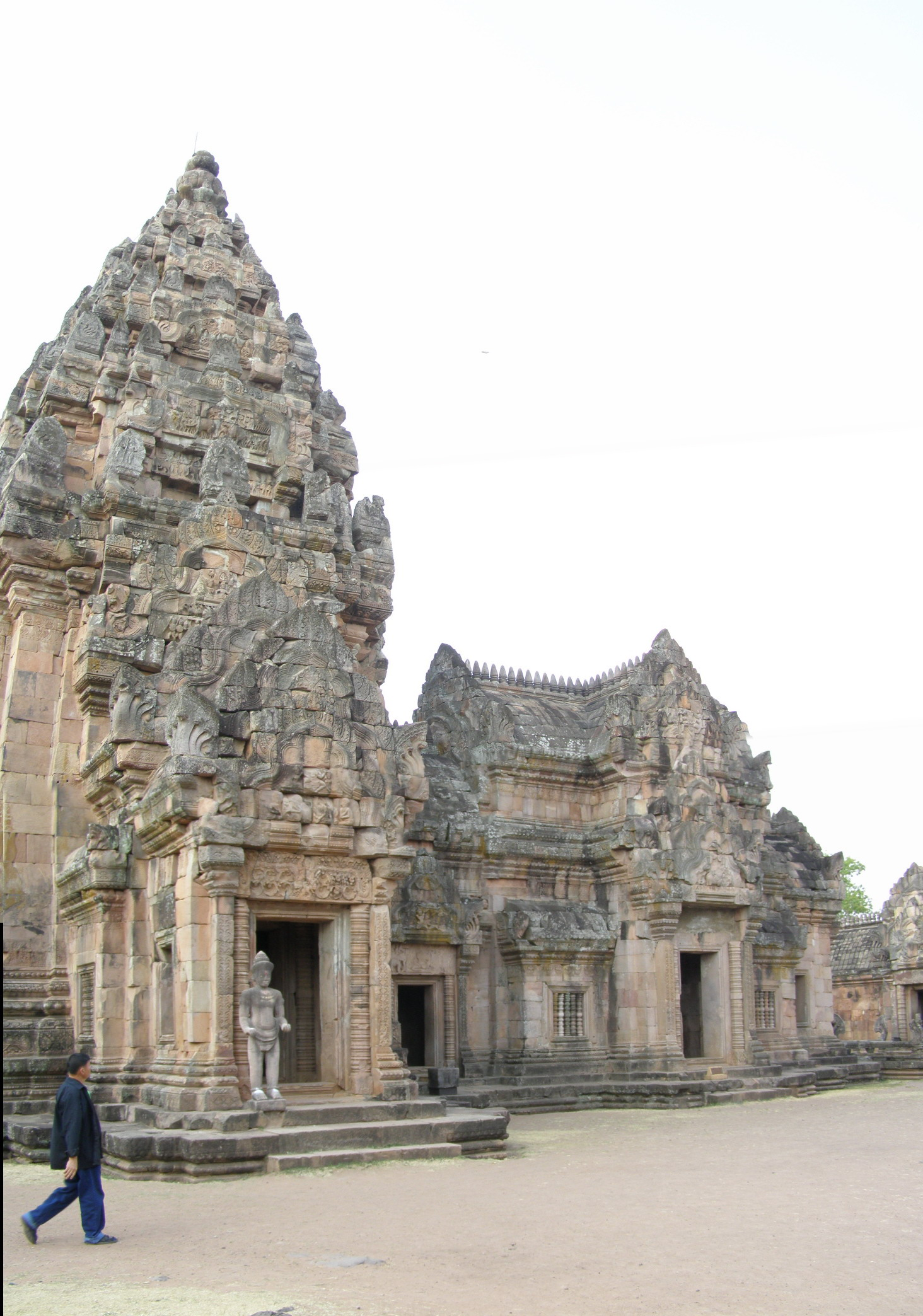
Phanom Rung temple's prang and its mandapa, Thailand

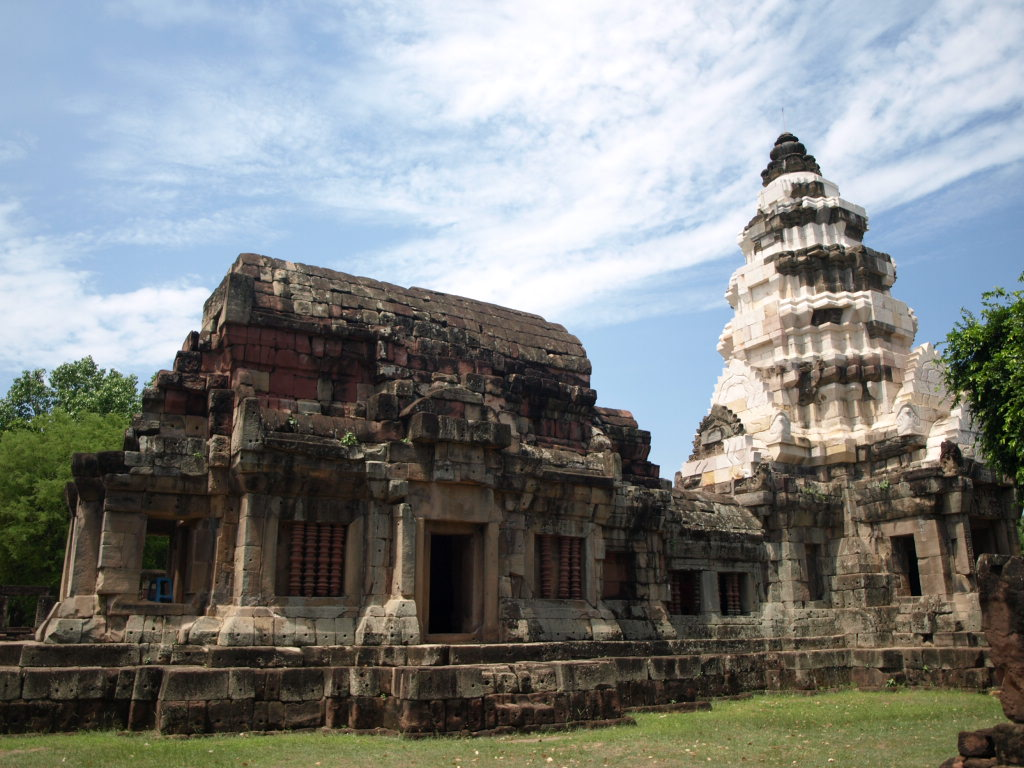
Mandapa of Phanom Wan temple, Thailand

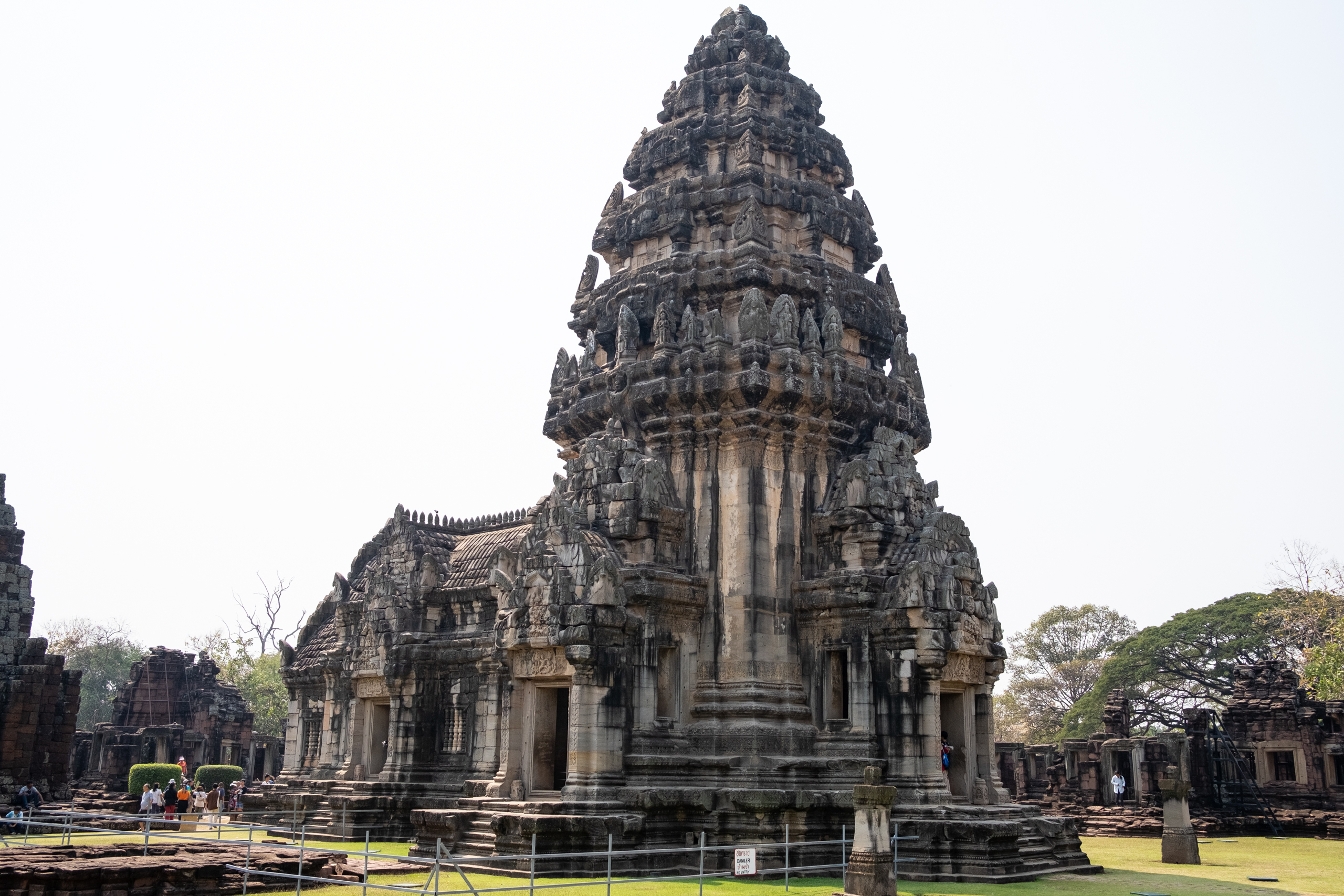
Mandapa and tower of Phimai temple, Thailand

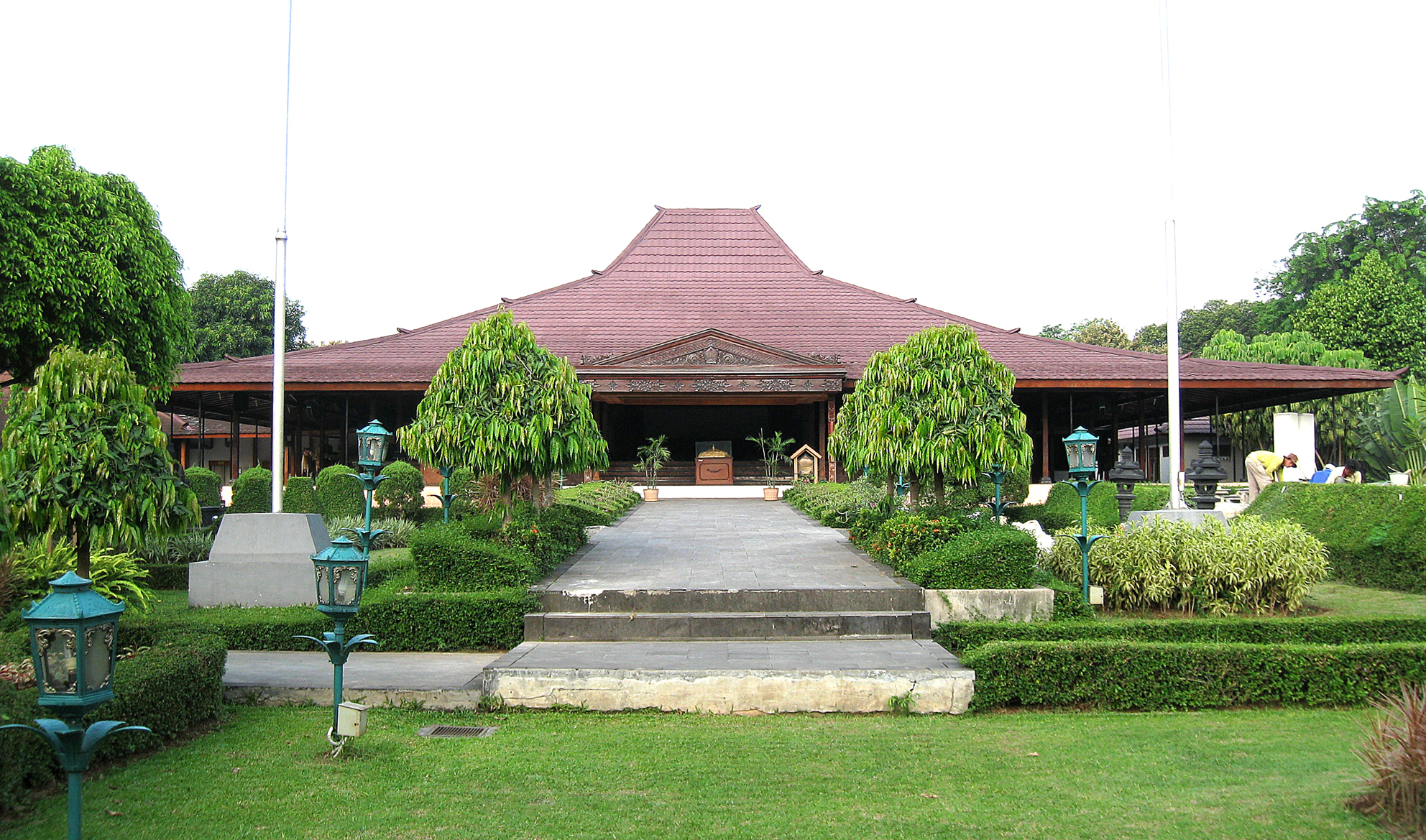
Royal pendopo in Java, Indonesia, commonly found in sultans' palaces

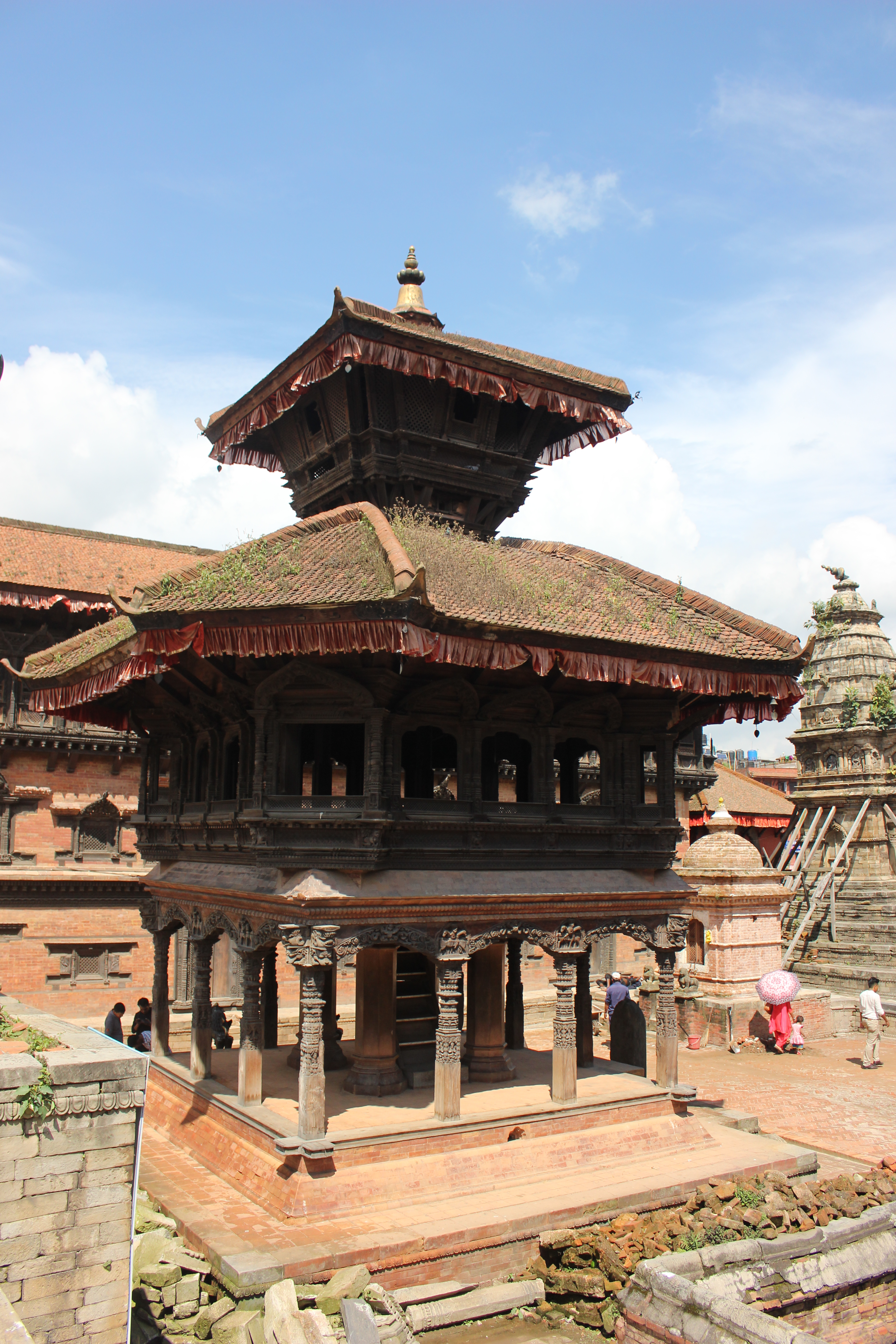
Chyasilin Mandap in Bhaktapur, Nepal

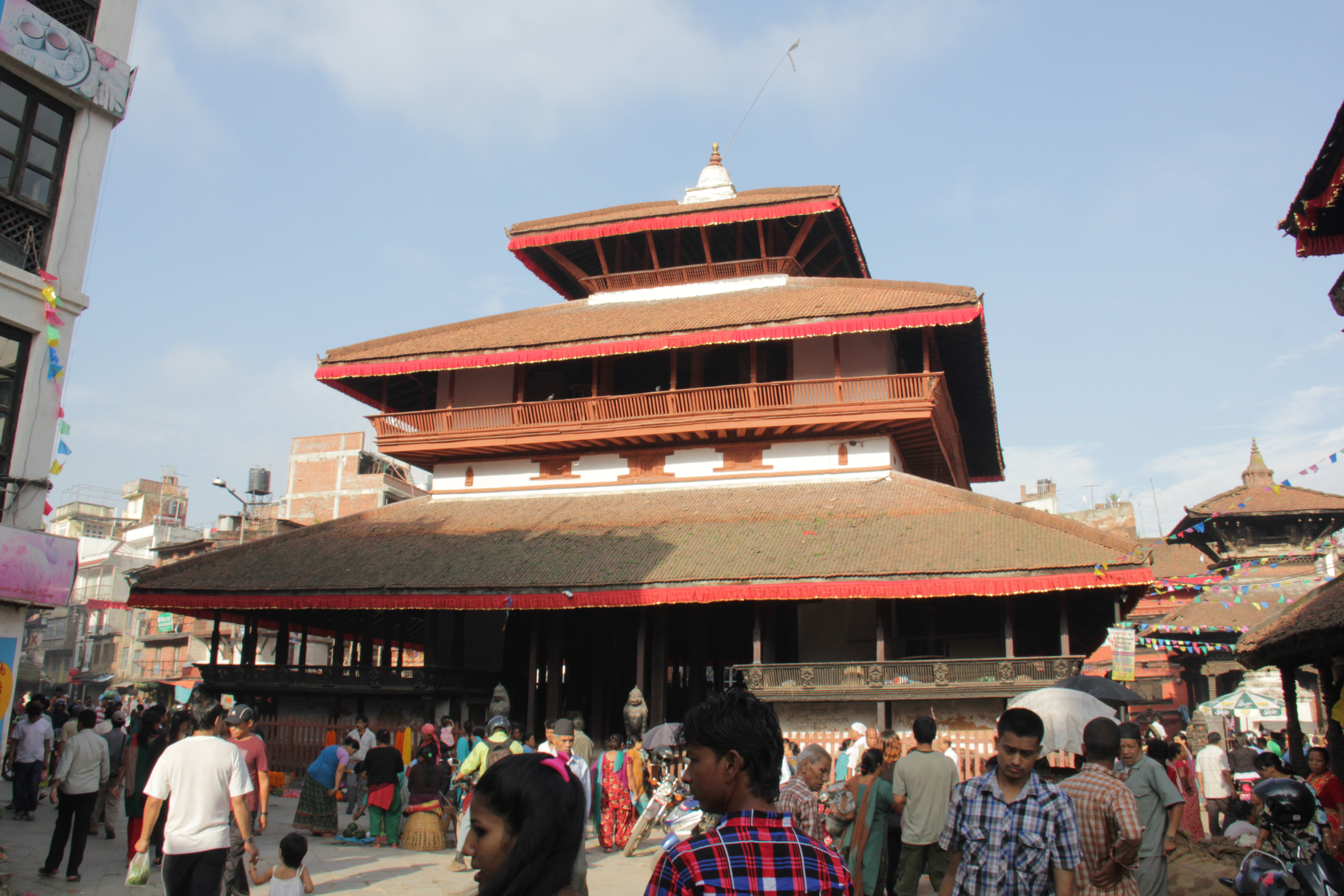
Kasthamandap in Kathmandu, Nepal

== See also ==
- Pendopo
- Wedding mandapa
- Zayat
