= Chau Say Tevoda =

Archaeological site in Cambodia

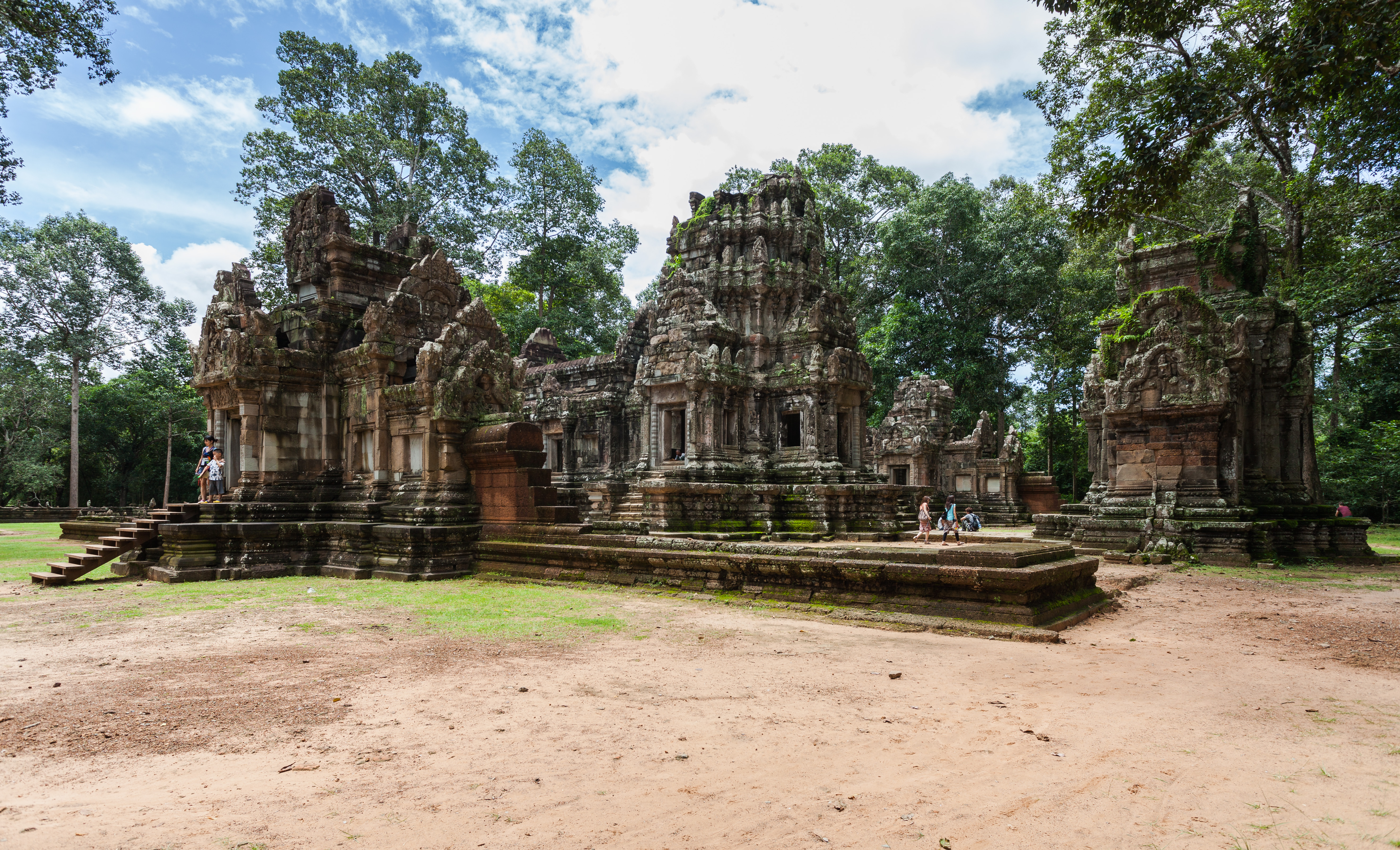
- Entire view of Chau Say Tevoda temple

- Location in Cambodia

Religion
- Affiliation: Hinduism
- Province: Siem Reap
- Deity: Shiva and Vishnu

Location
- Location: Angkor
- Country: Cambodia
- Interactive map of Chau Say Tevoda
- Coordinates: 13.4454°N 103.8778°E

Architecture
- Type: Khmer (Angkor Wat style)
- Creator: Suryavarman II, continued by Yasovarman II, additions by Jayavarman VIII
- Completed: mid-12th century

Chau Say Tevoda (Khmer: ប្រាសាទចៅសាយទេវតា, literally: prolific grandchildren of a deity) is a Angkor Thom gate of the dead terrace of the animals temple at Angkor, Cambodia. It is just east of Angkor Thom, directly south of Thommanon across the Victory Way (it pre-dates the former and post-dates the latter). Built in the mid-12th century, it is a Hindu temple in the Angkor Wat period. It is dedicated to Shiva and Vishnu with unique types of female sculptures of devatas enshrined in it. The Buddha images have been interpreted to have been built during the reign of Dharanindravarman, father of Jayavarman VII, who ruled from Preah Khan of Kompong. The temple was in a dilapidated state with 4,000 of its elements lying scattered on the embankment and in the Siem Reap River. Many of these elements were used in the restoration work carried out by a Chinese team between 2000 and 2009 under a project sponsored by the People's Republic of China. The temple was reopened in late 2009.

== Location ==
Chau Say Tevoda is a temple at Angkor, Cambodia just to the northeast of the ancient capital Angkor Thom's east gate, directly south of Thommanon across the Victory Way (it pre-dates the former and post-dates the latter). It is on a road which has the Thomannon temple on its opposite side, 500 metres (1,600 ft) from the east gate and 200 metres (660 ft) to a bridge built with carved stones from temple ruins in the vicinity. The bridge is without a river flowing beneath it in view of the shifting nature of the course of the Siem Reap River.

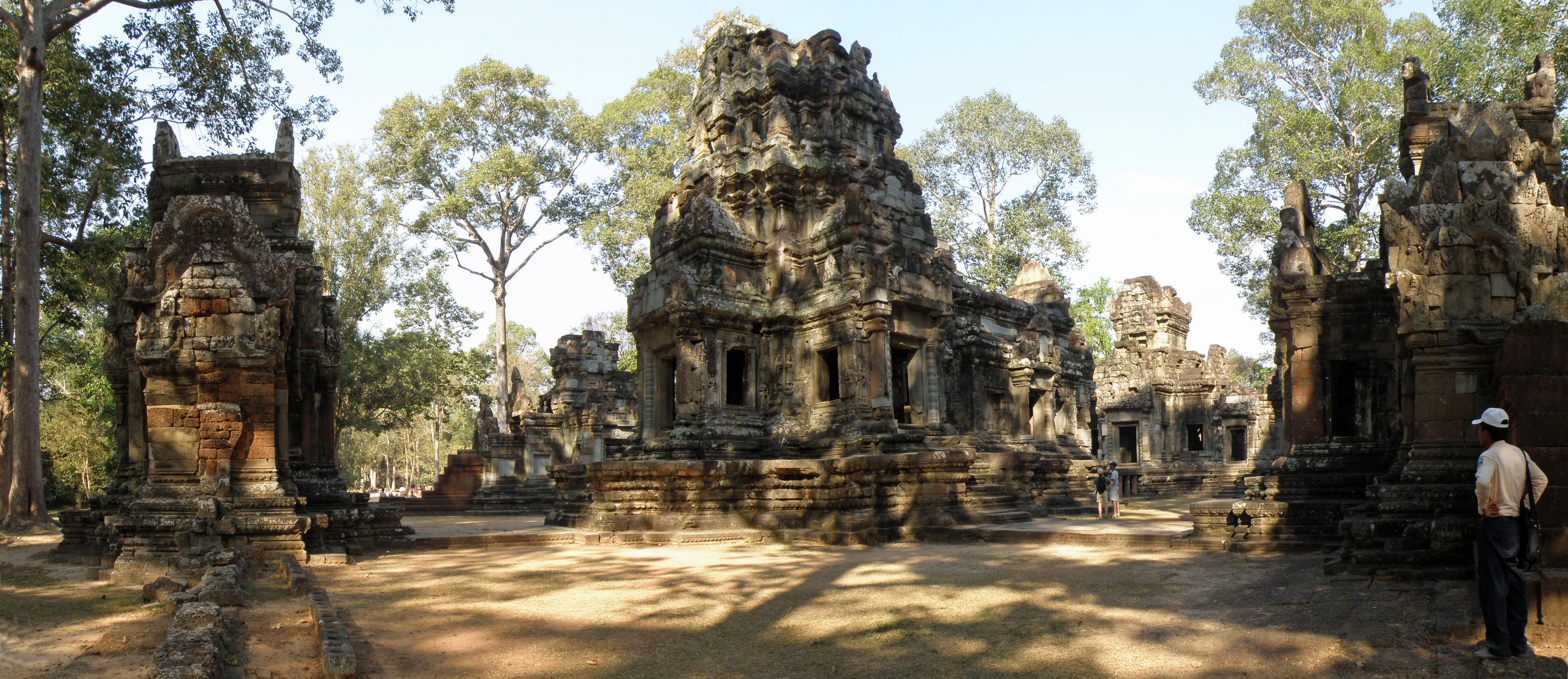
Wide view

== History ==
Originally Chau Say Tevoda was partly built in the mid-12th century under the reign of King Suryavarman II. Further supplementation of structures was done under the reign of Jayavarman VII. Though the temple was built under Hindu kings during the 11th and 12th centuries with predominantly Hindu deities such as Shiva and Vishnu, representation of Buddha images was interpreted to have been built during the reign of Dharanindravarman, father of Jayavarman VII, who ruled from Preah Khan Kompong Svay.

The temple was reconstructed on the basis of about 4,000 elements of the temple that were found lying around at the site. This restoration was done by a Chinese team between 2000 and 2009 under a project sponsored by the People's Republic of China.

== Features ==
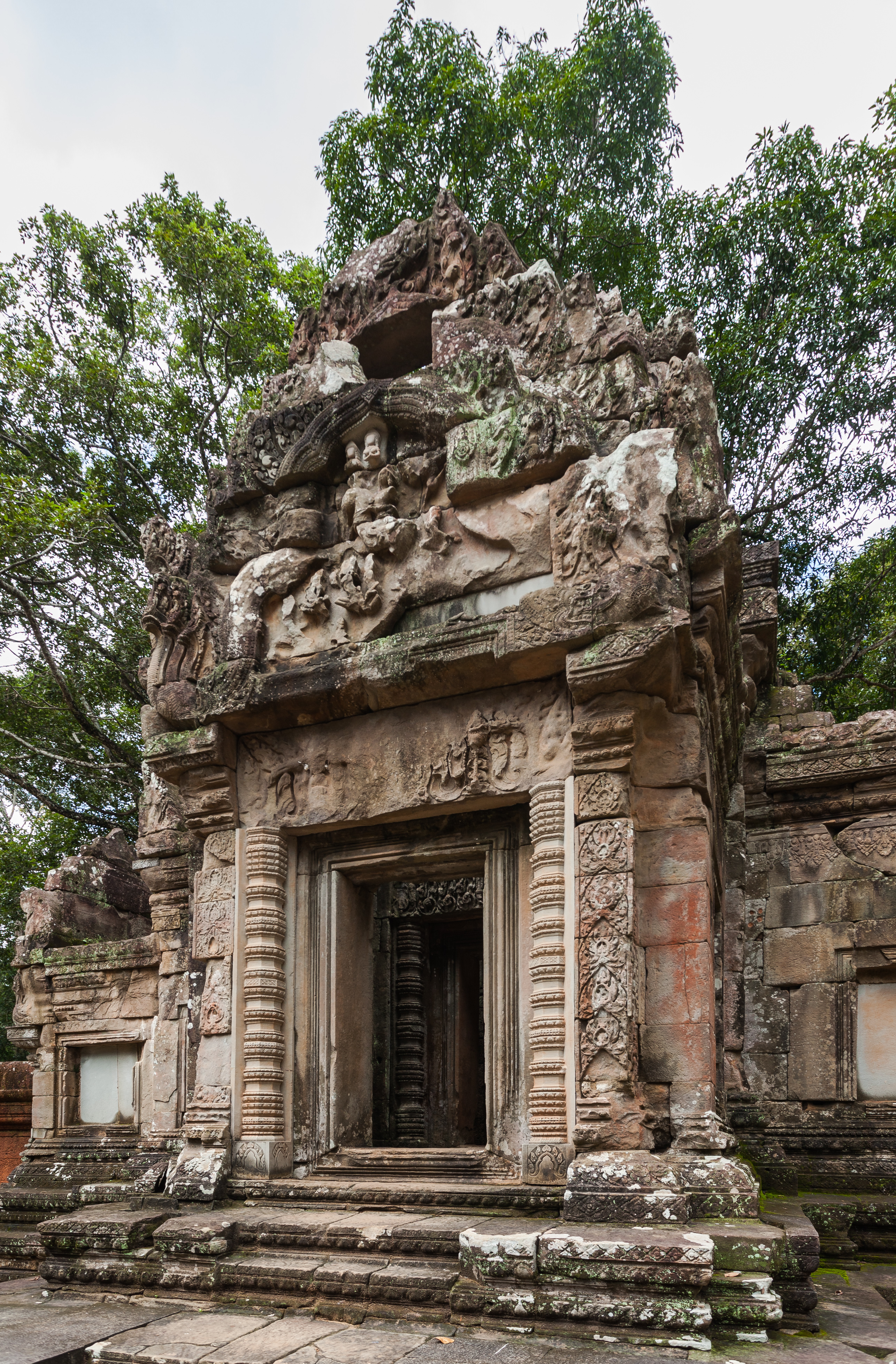
Gopura.

The Tevoda is built to a cruciform plan and linked to an entrance hall, similar to the Hindu temples built in India, particularly in Odisha. The temple has four gopuras or towers on the four cardinal signs with an entrance from the east through a raised bridge. The long hall, which links the gopuras and central chamber of the temple, has very elegant flower decorations. The temple consists of a central tower with an attached mandapa, which is achieved through an antarala chamber of small size, and with two libraries on its southern and northern sides.

It is enclosed by a compound wall which has four gopuras or towers. To its east, there is a raised causeway that leads to the Siem Reap River. Many of the sculptures depict Vishnu and are in a fairly good condition. However, the main deity of the temple is Shiva. Some of the sculptures are also of Buddha but disfigured totally. With time the ceiling has collapsed and led to further deterioration. The defaced Buddhas, which are deified in a lotus posture, flanked by devotees, are in a mandapa behind a pediment from the entrance door which leads to the antarala.

The incomplete eastern Gopura I, which is oriented in the western direction, has a roof which is part of the second "pediment of the lateral southern extension" which is not fully restored. The main figure here is of Buddha in a cross legged posture seated on a high platform flanked by disfigured carvings which are interpreted as that of Garuda and the king of Nagas. The top pediment of this Gopura I with figure of Buddha has an umbrella cover of a Bodhi tree. Carvings depicting episodes from the life of Buddha are seen on the northern door of the eastern Gopura I. A notable bass relief here is of Sita (heroine of the epic Ramayana) in a seated posture over an altar flanked by rakshasis (female demonesses). Hanuman, in a small monkey form, is carved in sitting posture facing Sita and offering her Rama's ring. A wall built with laterite stones enclosing the temple, which had existed in the past, has disappeared.

The temple was in a dilapidated state with 4,000 of its elements lying scattered on the embankment and in the Siem Reap River. Between 2000 and 2009 some of these elements were put together under a restoration project initiated by the People's Republic of China. The temple reopened in late 2009 and is fully accessible.

== Gallery ==
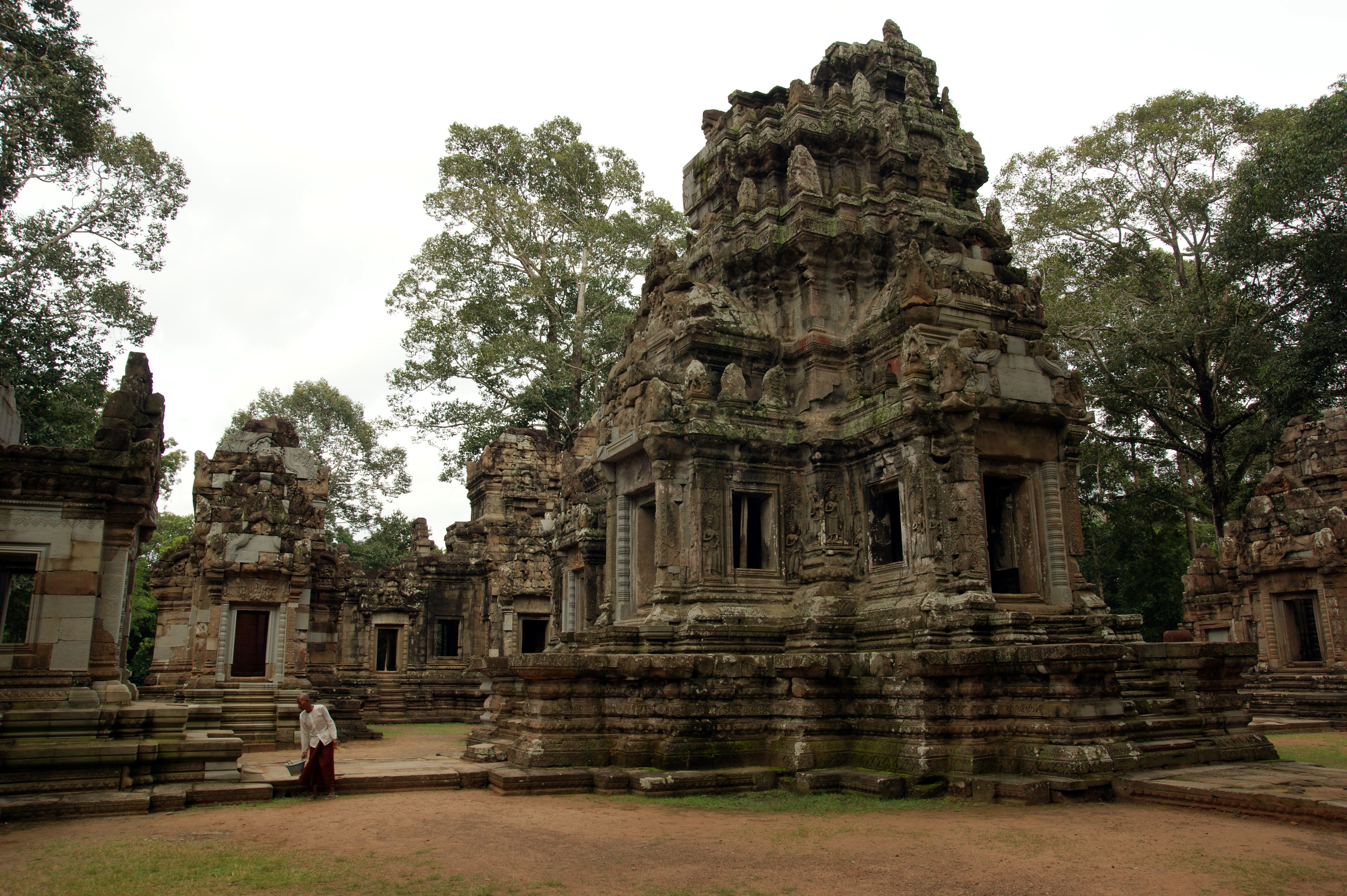
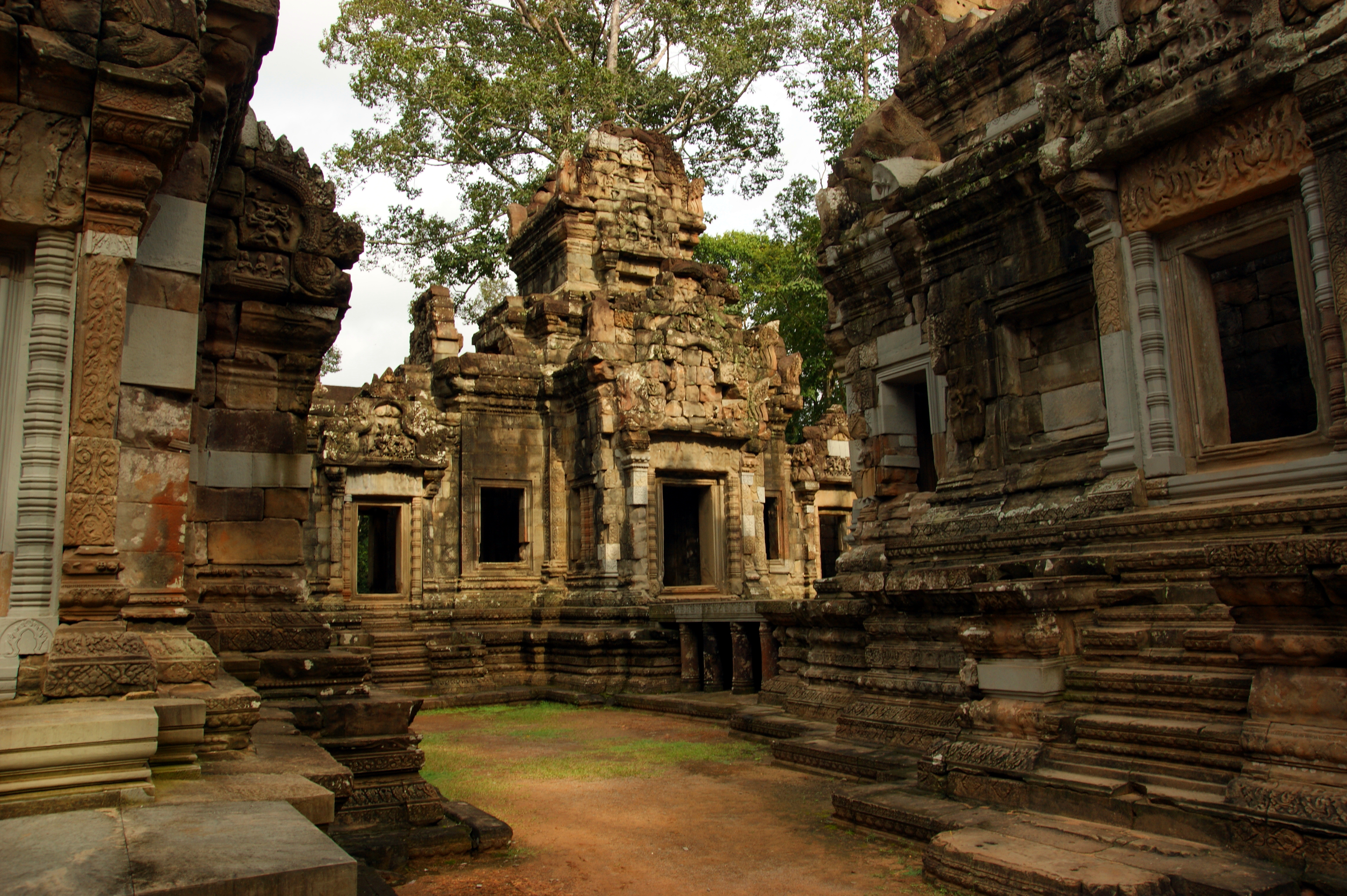
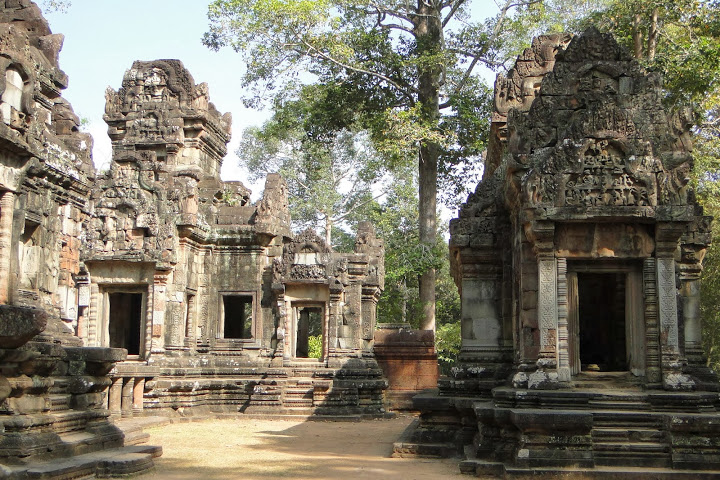
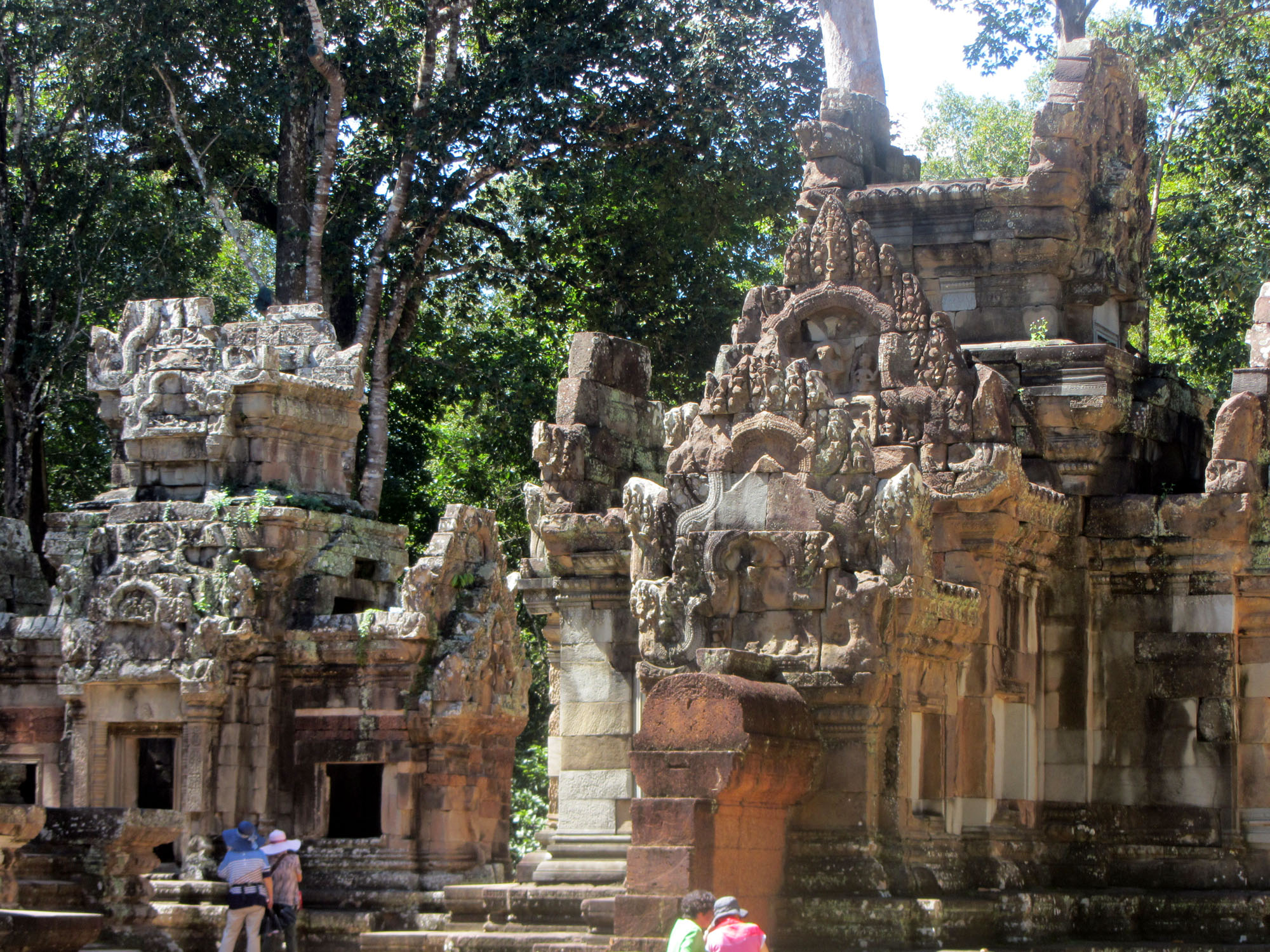
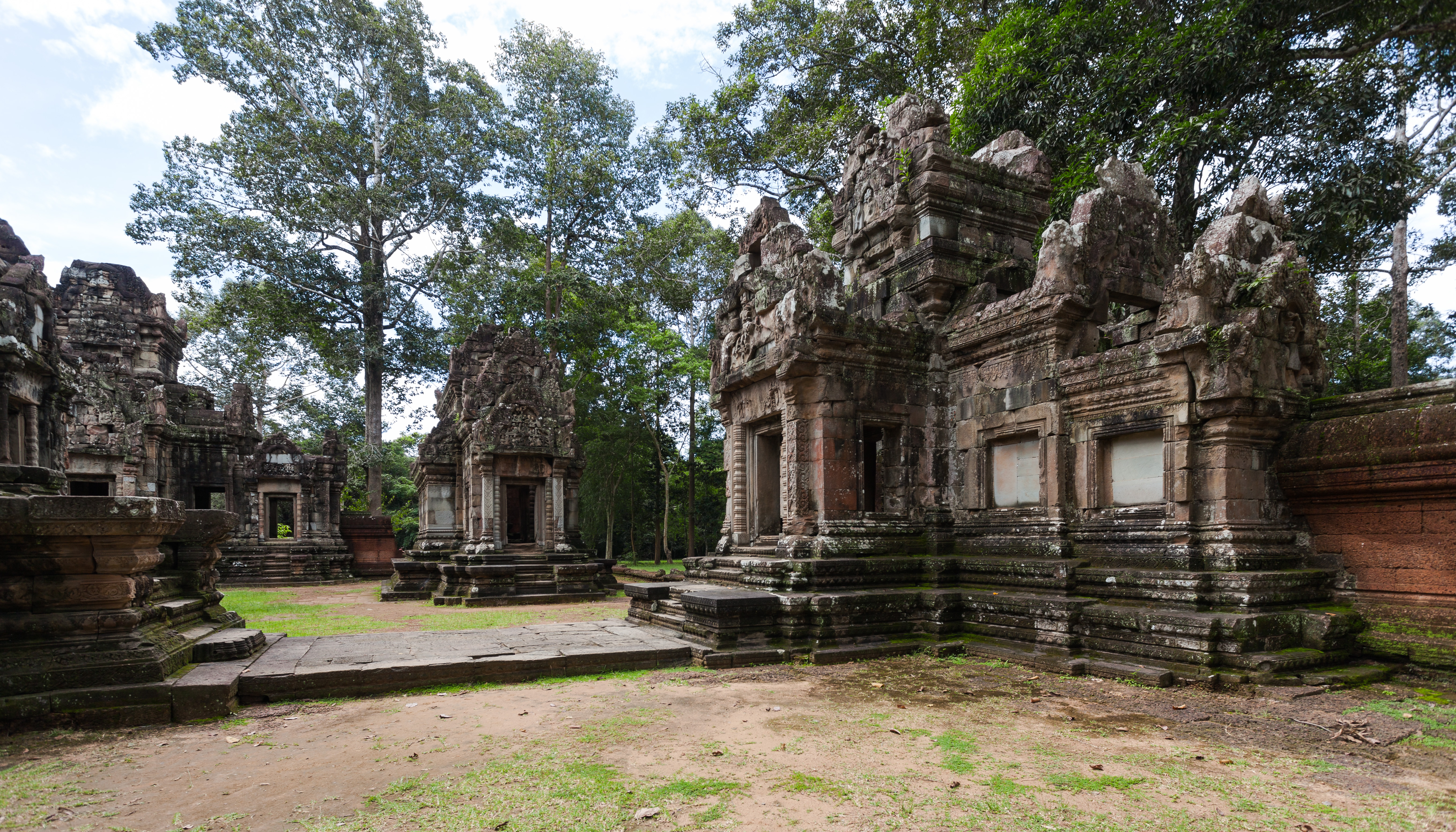

== Bibliography ==
- Arrowood, Janet (2011). Cambodia Travel Adventures. Hunter Publishing, Inc. ISBN 978-1-58843-726-6.
- Chihara, Daigorō (1996). Hindu-Buddhist Architecture in Southeast Asia. BRILL. ISBN 90-04-10512-3.
- Degroot, Veronique; Klokke, Marijke J. (2013). Materializing Southeast Asia's Past: Selected Papers from the 12th International Conference of the European Association of Southeast Asian Archaeologists. NUS Press. ISBN 978-9971-69-655-9.
- Palmer, Beverley (2002). Cambodia. Rough Guides. ISBN 978-1-85828-837-6.
