= Thommanon =

Hindu temple in Angkor, Cambodia

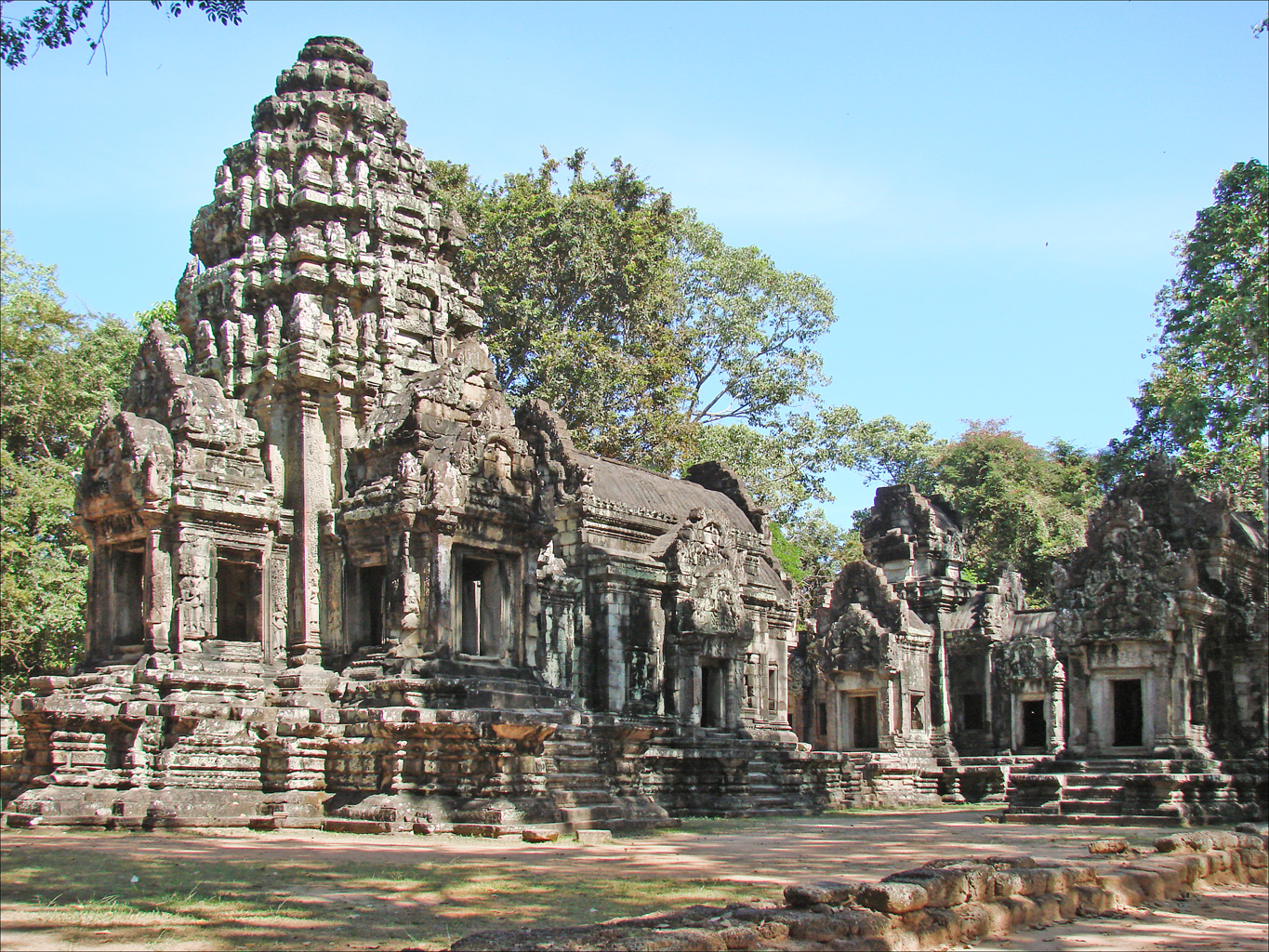

- Location in Cambodia

Religion
- Affiliation: Hinduism
- District: Siem Reap
- Province: Siem Reap
- Deity: Shiva and Vishnu

Location
- Location: Angkor
- Country: Cambodia
- Interactive map of Thommanon
- Coordinates: 13°26′48″N 103°52′38″E

Architecture
- Type: Khmer architecture
- Completed: 12th century

Thommanon (Khmer: ប្រាសាទធម្មនន្ទ) is one of a pair of Hindu temples built during the reign of Suryavarman II (1113–1150) at Angkor, Cambodia. This small and elegant temple is east of the Gate of Victory of Angkor Thom and north of Chau Say Tevoda. It is part of the UNESCO World Heritage Site, inscribed by UNESCO in 1992 titled Angkor. The temple is dedicated to Shiva and Vishnu.

== History ==
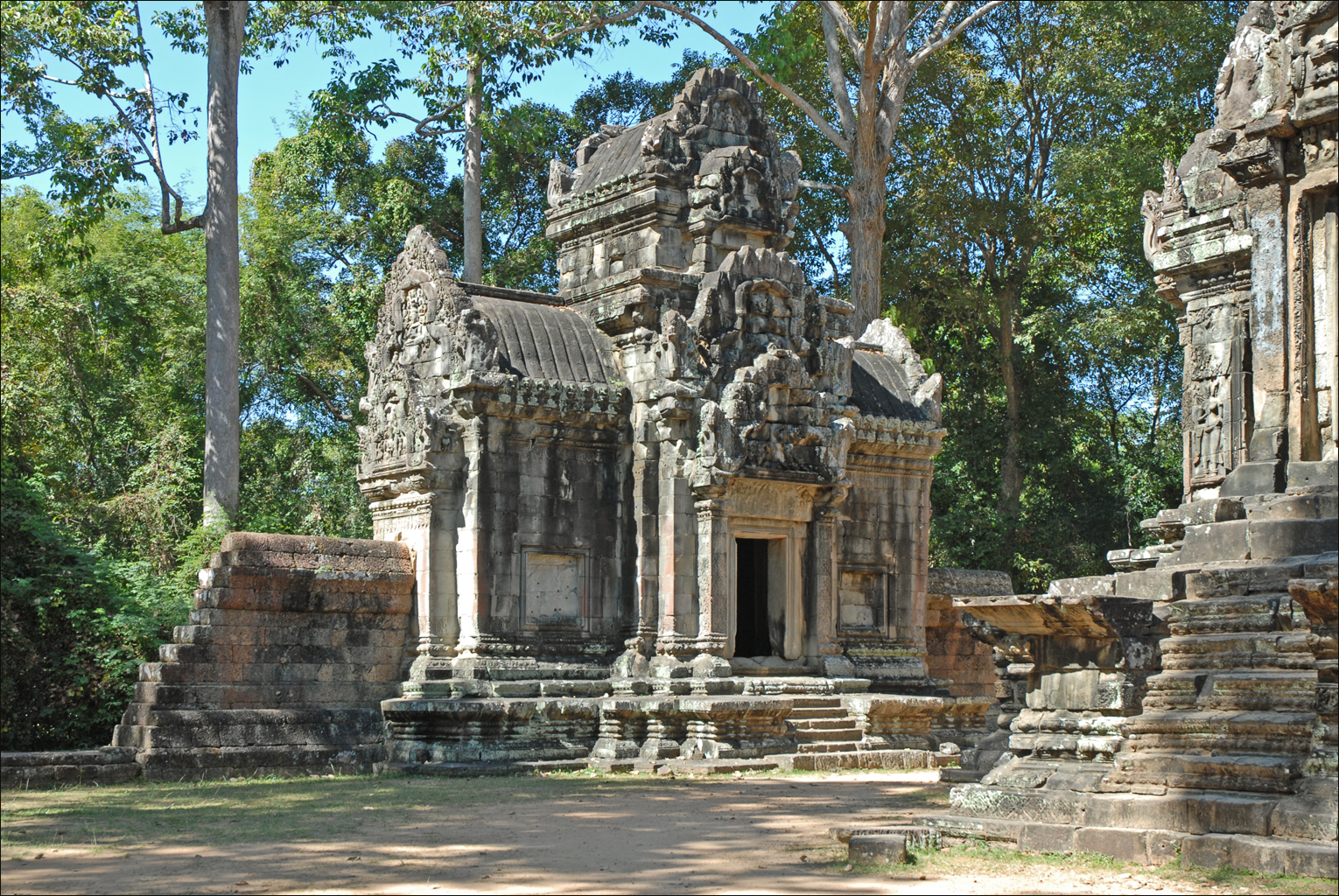
Library

Scholars studying the carvings of the devatas in Thommanon have concluded that it was built around the time when work on Angkor Wat was begun. However, there is some disagreement as to the precise date it was built. Some believe that the distinctive carvings of females, known as devatas, indicate that they were built during the reign of Jayavarman VI (1080–1113 AD), some time at the end of the 11th century. However, there is greater agreement, especially given the scholarly studies, that it was built by Suryavarman II around the time of Angkor Wat and Beng Mealea from 1113 to 1150 AD.

The Vaishnavite cult was adopted in Cambodia by Suryavarman II and the shaivite cult of Linga worship was subsumed with the Vaishnavite cult in the temples such as the Thommannon, Beng Mealea, Chau Say Tevoda, Banteay Samre, and Angkor Wat.

Thommanon is directly opposite the Chau Say Tevoda and just 500 metres east of the Victory Gate on the way to Ta Keo. In the 1960s, the temple underwent a full restoration, funded by the École française d'Extrême-Orient (EFEO). French archaeologists restored it and added concrete ceilings.

== Structure ==
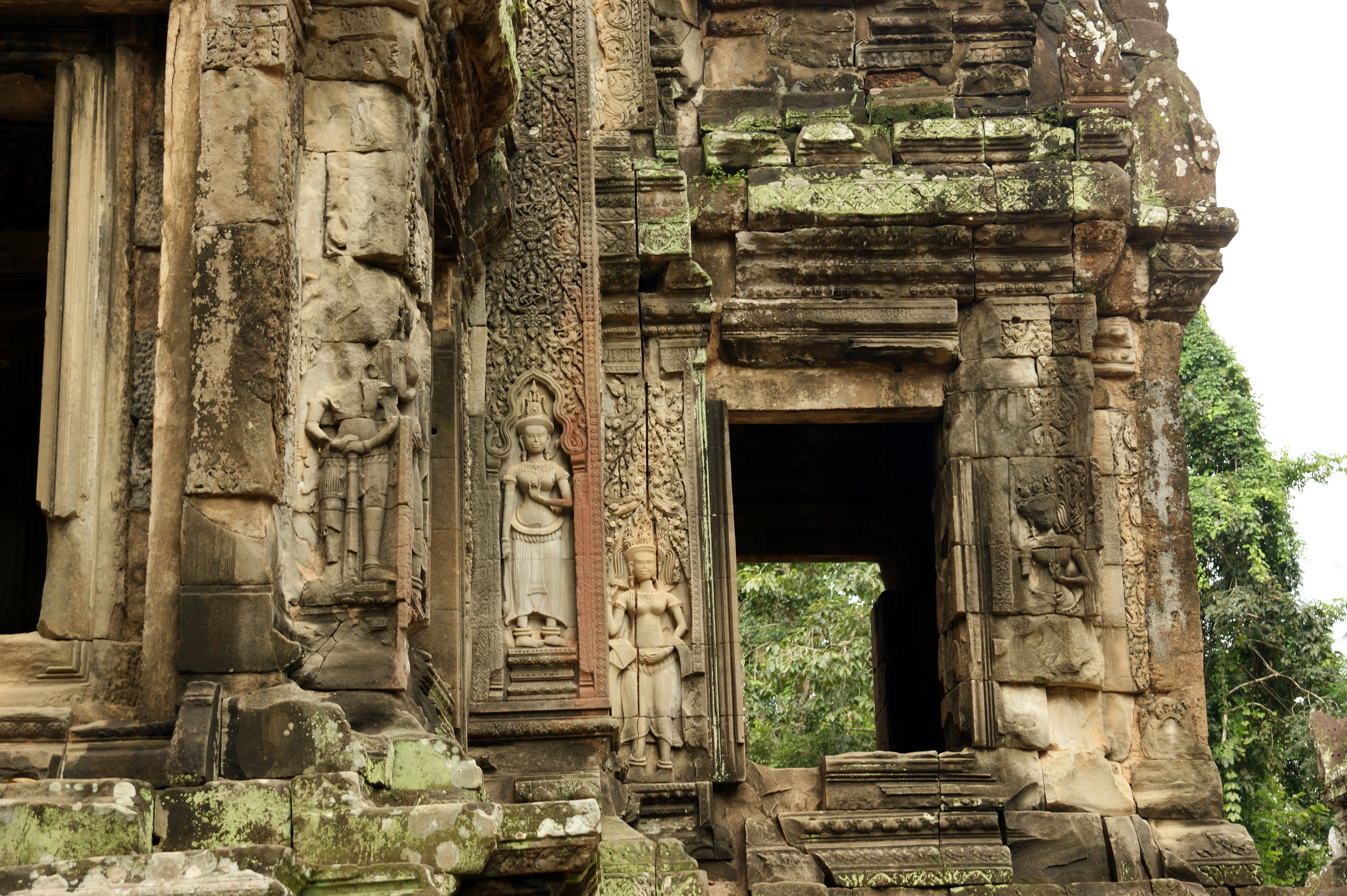
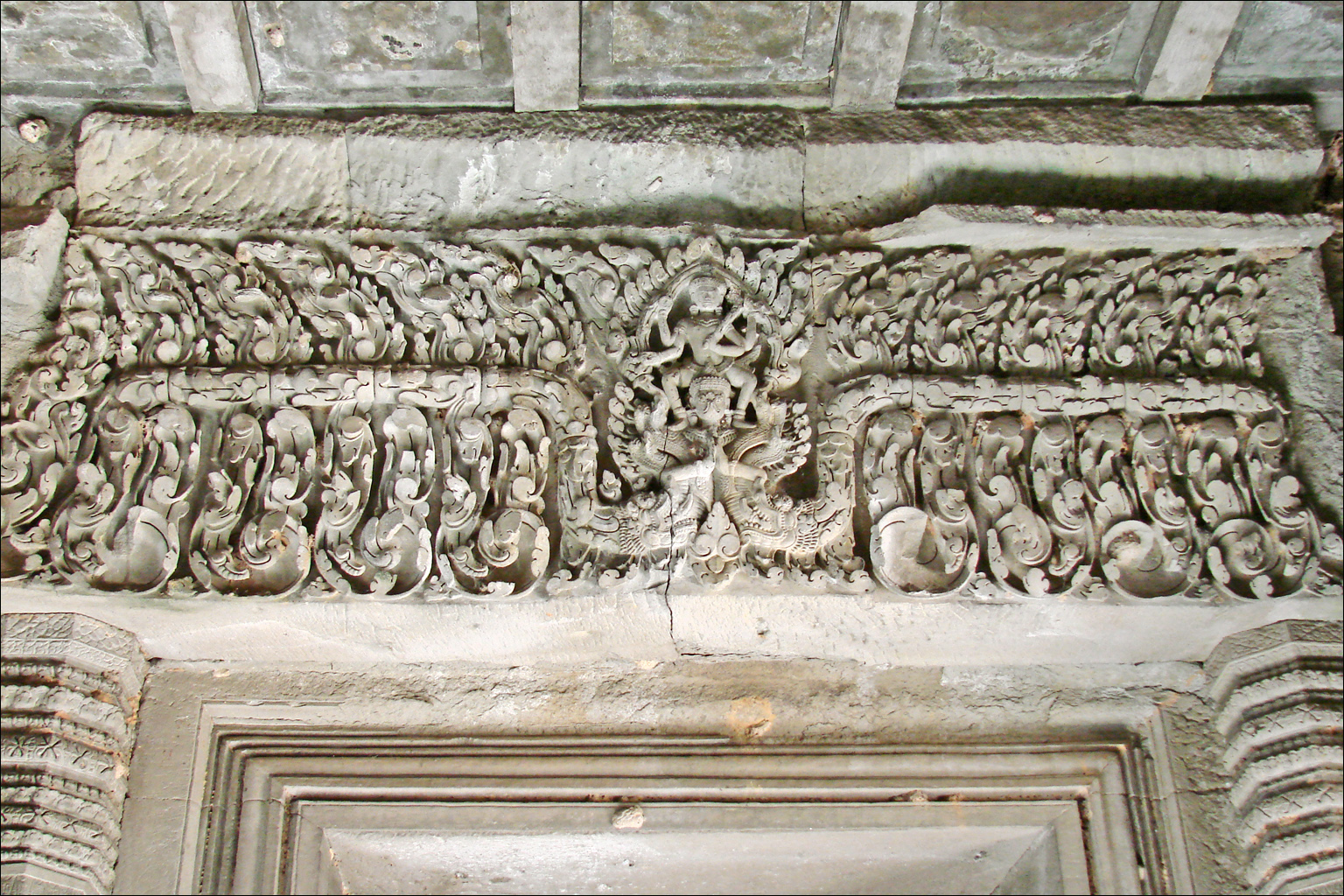
Left: Doorway with carvings.
Right: A panel on the lintel of the entrance to the temple.

Thommanon is a single-towered temple with an east-facing central sanctuary, crowned by a prasat, or tower. Access from the east is via a gopura, followed by a mandapa, or antechamber, before arriving at the central sanctuary.

The temple's carvings are very well preserved and the aged sandstone provides a distinct contrast to the surrounding jungle. The architectural style of its tower is akin to the Angkor Wat temple and the Chau Say Tevoda in its vicinity.

Thommanon is better preserved than Chau Say Tevoda, though they are similar in design. The reason for better preservation of Thommanon is attributed to the fact that its superstructure does not have stone-enclosed wood beams. Thus, adoption of sandstone as the medium for carvings in this temple has made it more advanced in its architectural design vis-à-vis other temples in its vicinity, which were mostly wood-based. All doorways include carved pediments.

The compound walls around the temple have all disappeared, leaving only the entry gates on the east and the west. The central tower is all that remains of the main temple. It is inferred that Thommanon and Chau Say Thavoda were interlinked to the central tower under one large compound with large gates. The independent building separated from the main temple was the library.

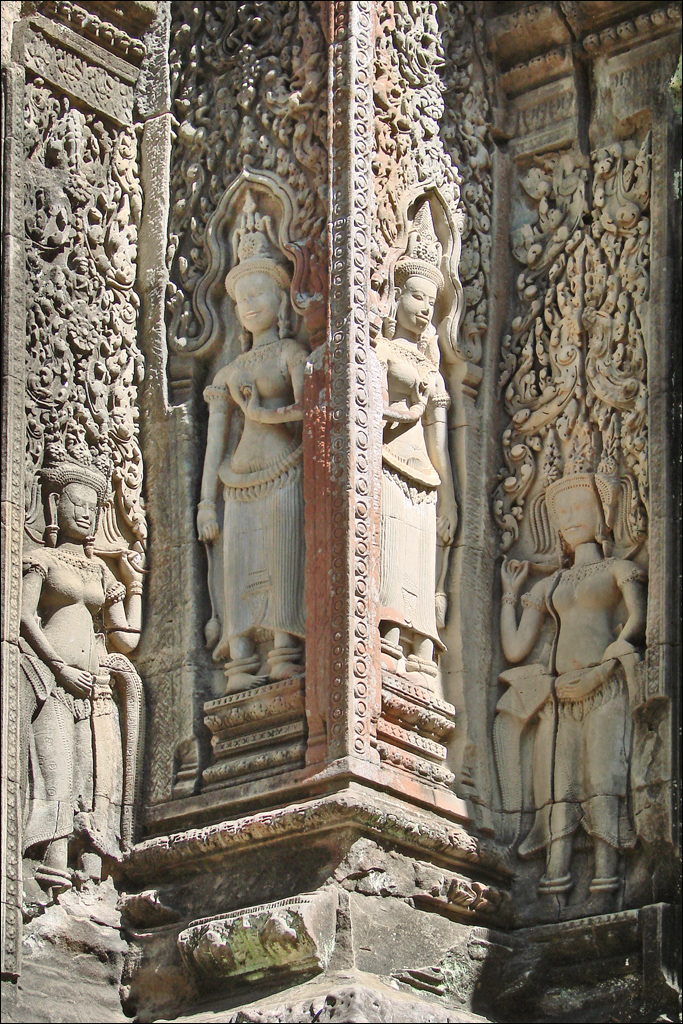
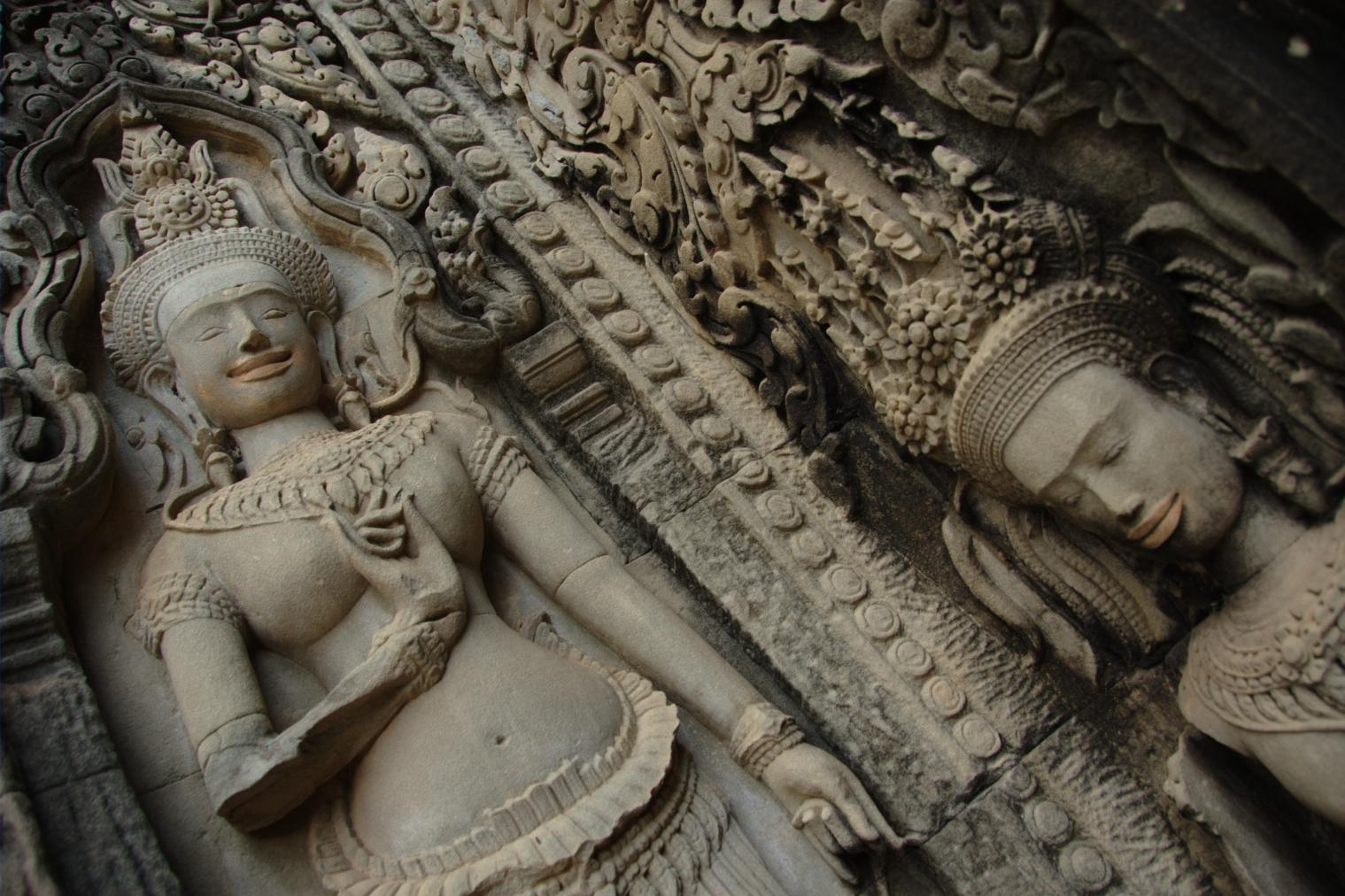
Left: Devatas in a corner panel depiction with two styles of skirts.
Right: More depictions of devatas.

=== Devatas ===
Images of devatas, the female divine carved figurines, are seen in profusion here, as in other Khmer temples. They are the centre of attraction in Thommanon. The devatas depict flower crowns, sampots (Cambodian skirts), necklaces, armbands, belts and ankle bands.

The mudras displayed are complex. The devatas grip the flower very distinctively, holding the ring and middle fingers against the thumb, while the index and small finger are extended. One Angkor researcher calls this position the "devata mudra" and notes it is also prominent at Angkor Wat.

The sampots of the devatas are divided into two types: one is the ancient pleated style, seen in the Bakheng period at Lolei and Phnom Bok (900 AD), and the other is a patterned fabric style with folds and "tail" seen at Angkor Wat.

== Gallery ==
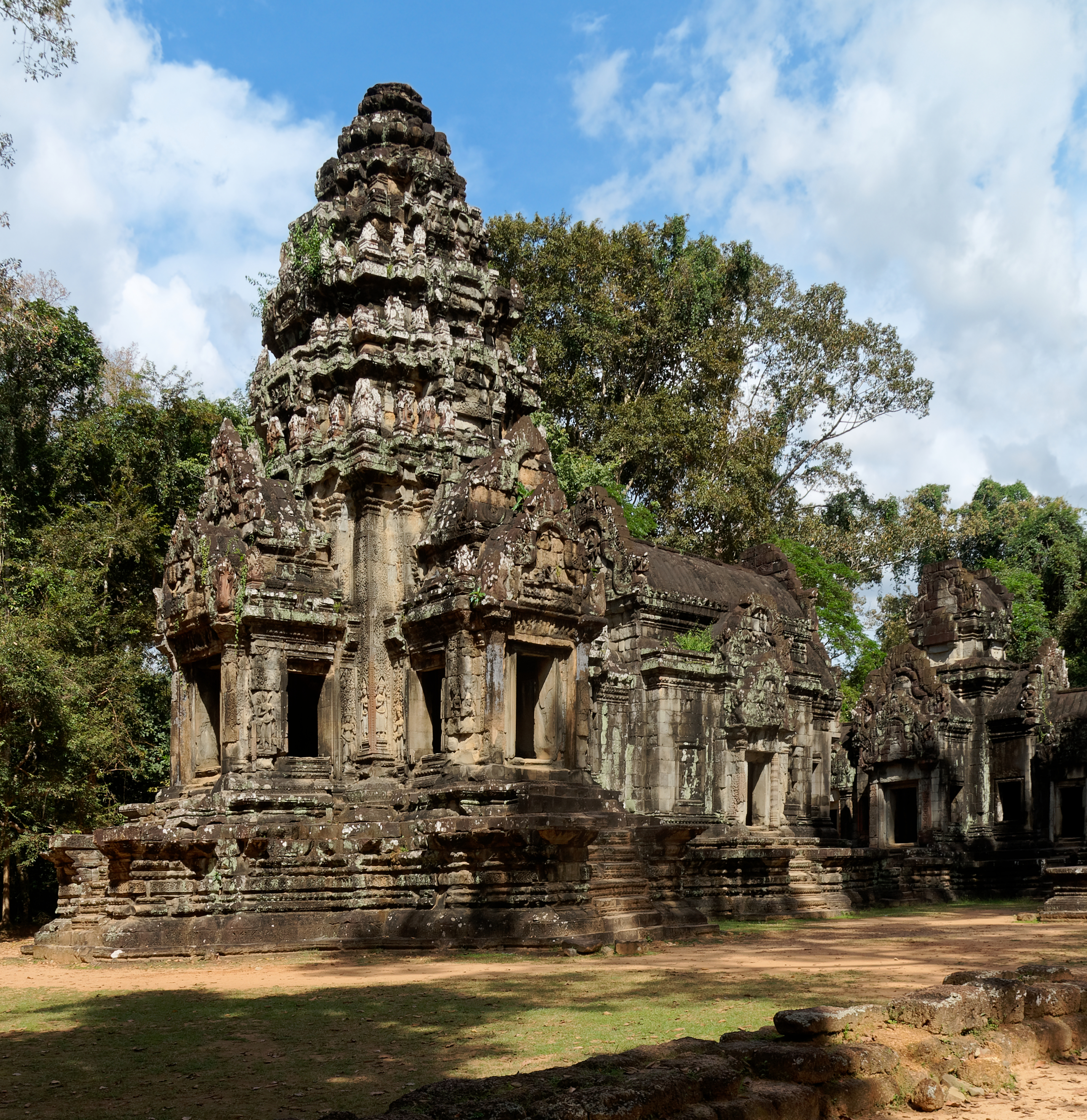

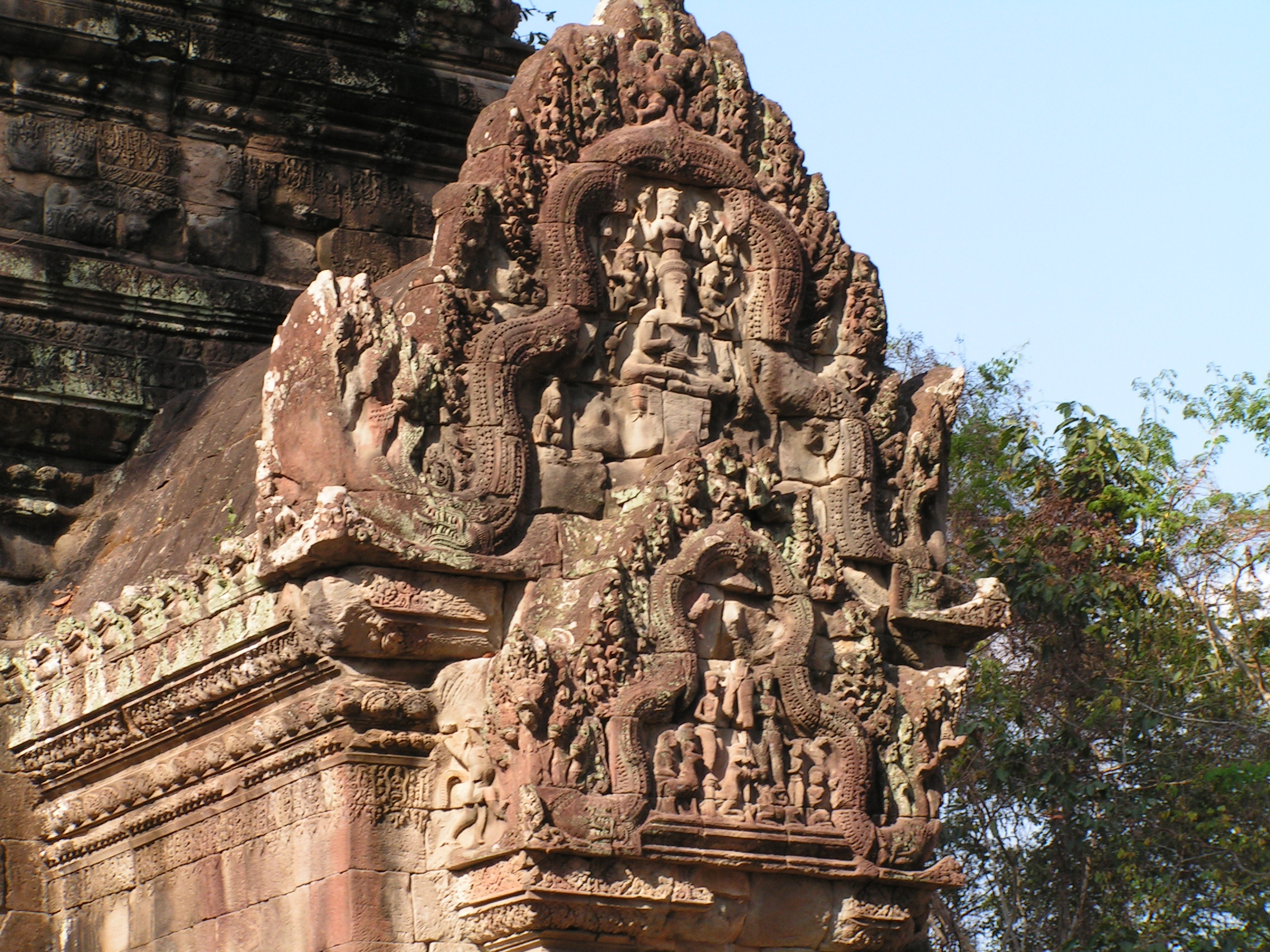

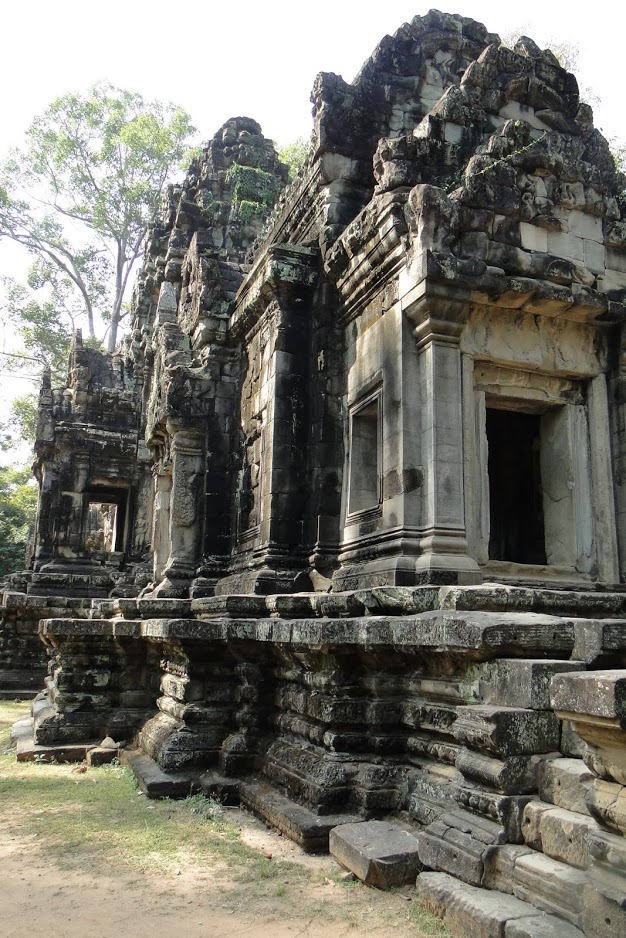

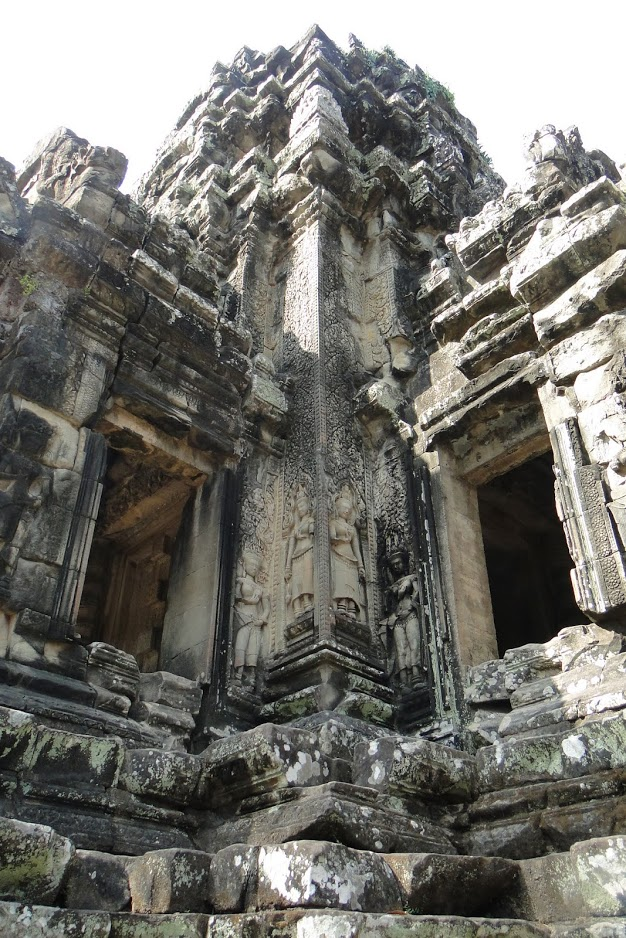
