= Nong Samet Refugee Camp =

Nong Samet Chumrum Thmei Rithysen or Rithisen
- Refugee camp
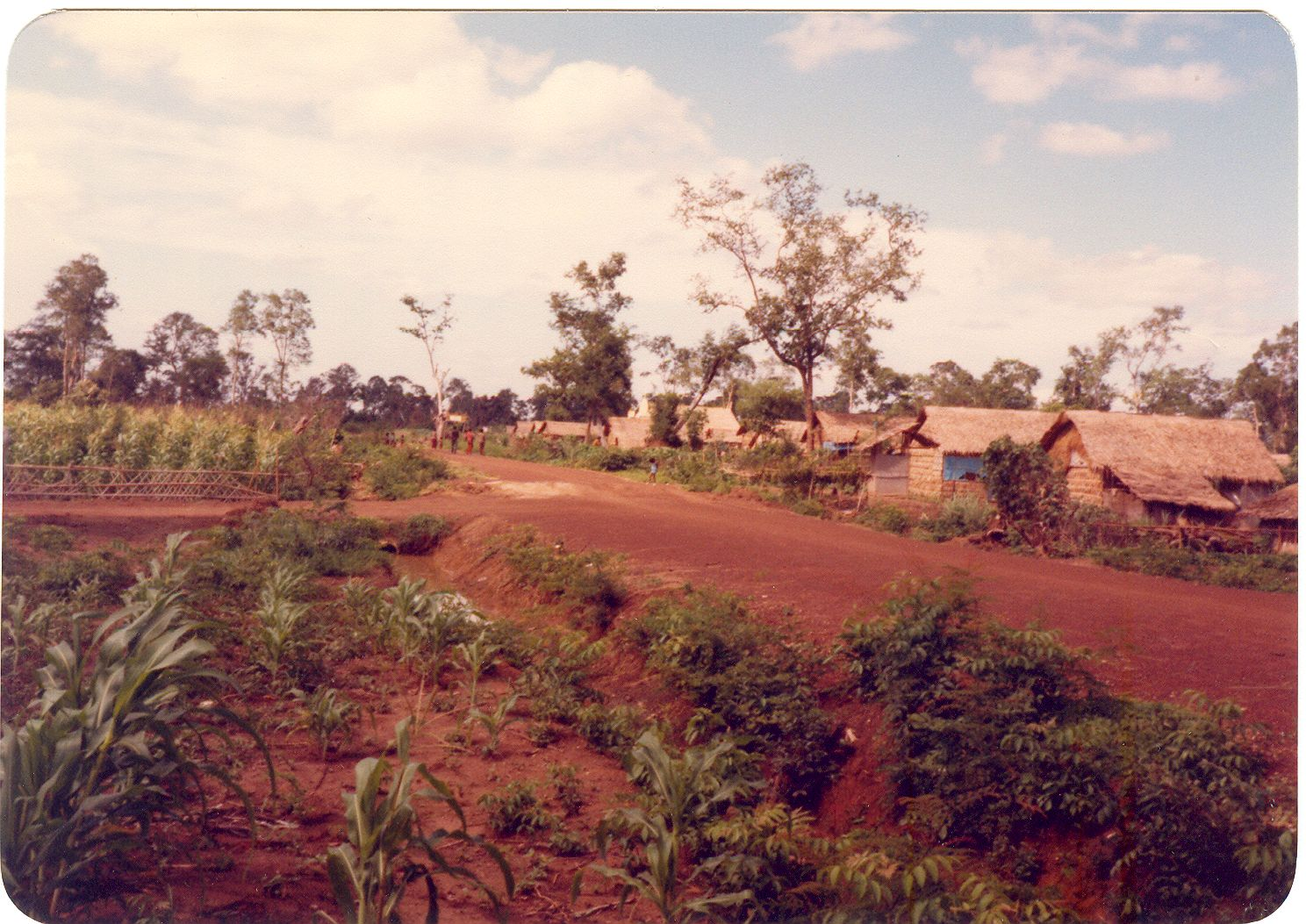
- Nong Samet Camp, section 2, May 1984.
- Nickname: 007
- Location in Thailand
- Coordinates: 13°49′55″N 102°44′00″E
- Country: Thailand
- Established by Cambodian refugees: May 1979
- Moved on the orders of the Royal Thai Government: May 1980
- Relocated by UNBRO and the Royal Thai Government: January 1983; December 1984

Government
  - Type: Guerrilla Organizations: Khmer Angkor, KPNLF
  - Military Commander: Long Rithia (May–December 1979)
  - Military Commander: In-Sakhan (December 1979-July 1980)
  - Military Commander: Om Luot (July 1980-October 1982)
  - Civilian Administrator: Thou Thon (1980-1993)

Area
  - Total: 2.1 km^{2} (0.81 sq mi)

Population (January 1984)
  - Total: 45,000 to 70,000
  - Density: 27,000/km^{2} (70,000/sq mi)

Nong Samet Refugee Camp (Thai: ค่ายผู้อพยพหนองเสม็ด, also known as 007, Rithisen or Rithysen), in Nong Samet Village, Khok Sung District, Sa Kaeo Province, Thailand, was a refugee camp on the Thai-Cambodian border and served as a power base for the Khmer People's National Liberation Front (KPNLF) until its destruction by the Vietnamese military in late 1984.

== Establishment of the camp ==
Refugees began entering Thailand in large numbers after Vietnam invaded Kampuchea in December 1978 and forced the Khmer Rouge out of power. A refugee settlement was established near the Thai village of Ban Nong Samet sometime in May 1979, and received its first shipment of food aid on 11 October.

The camp was originally referred to as Chumrum Thmei ('New Camp') to distinguish it from its neighbor and rival Mak Mun Camp, which was also known as Chumrum Chas ('Old Camp'). Nong Samet was later renamed "007" "because of its many intrigues" and in August 1980 was christened Rithysen, after a Khmer folk hero "who survived when his brothers and sisters were devoured through the machinations of a cannibal ogress, and who then tricked the ogress' daughter."

== Domination by Cambodian warlords ==
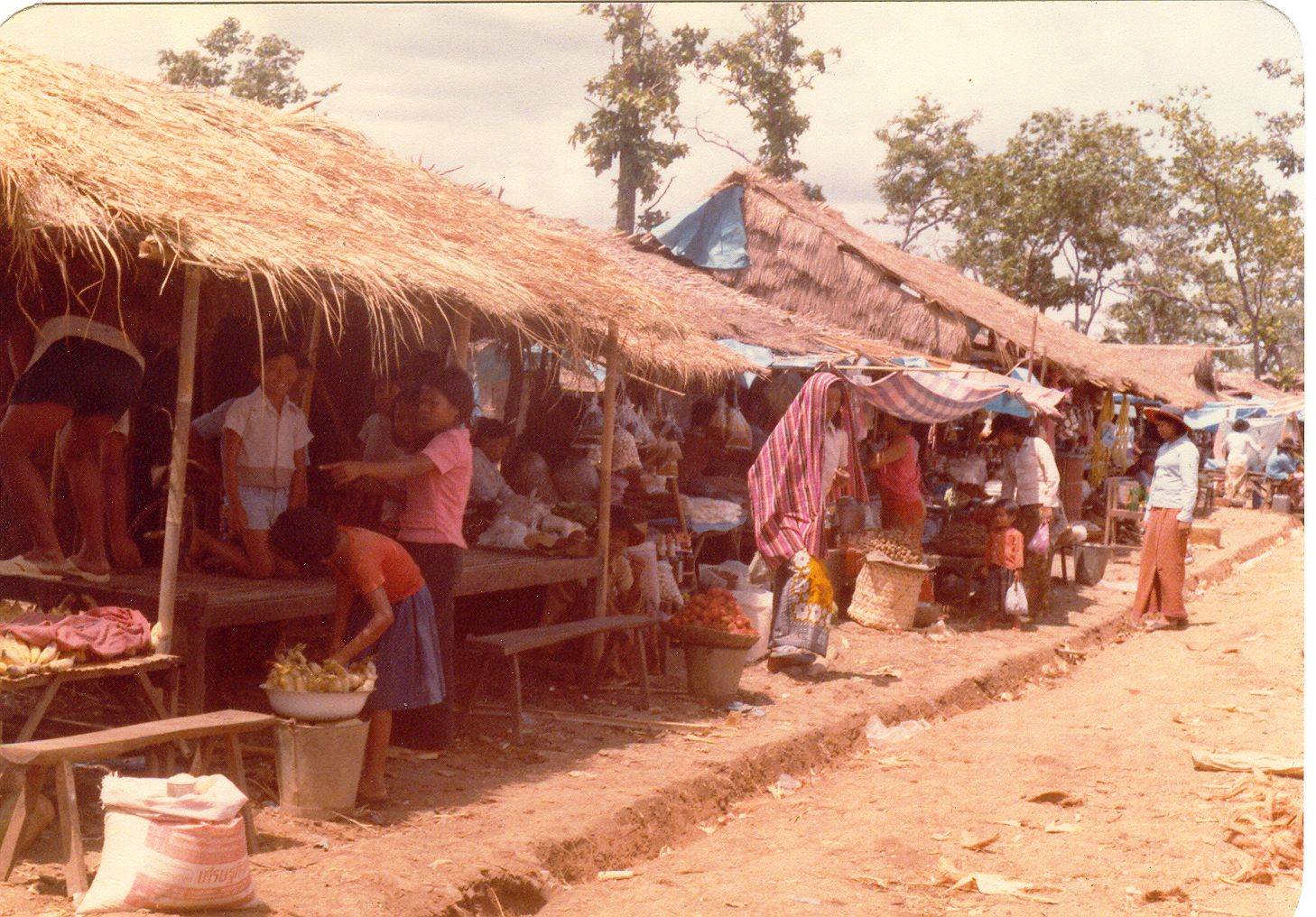
Market stalls, Nong Samet Refugee Camp, May 1984

Nong Samet Refugee Camp was originally just inside the Thai border, about one kilometer northeast of Mak Mun and two kilometers northeast of Nong Chan Refugee Camp. Almost immediately all three camps were dominated by autonomous warlords who, with several hundred undisciplined and badly-equipped guerrillas, controlled commercial activities and managed food distribution to the civilian population.

The camp's first leader was Long Rithia, a former infantry captain in the Khmer National Armed Forces (FANK) 7th Division who rallied several hundred soldiers from that unit and on 5 October established the Angkor National Liberation Movement (also referred to as Khmer Angkor).

In December 1979, In-Sakhan, another former officer from FANK who had been living on the border since 1975, declared himself leader of Nong Samet. He quickly realized that the size of the camp's civilian population would determine his power base, and encouraged a thriving border marketplace from which smugglers brought high-demand commodities into deprived Kampuchea. Within a short time Nong Samet's market attracted thousands of traders and black marketeers, and the guides and guards needed to transport goods and cash in this nearly lawless region. Gold and precious stones often substituted for currency on the border, and In-Sakhan's soldiers frequently served as security escorts.

In-Sakhan initially reported to International Committee of the Red Cross (ICRC) that the camp's population was at least 200,000 and aid agencies provided food and water for 180,000 people until December 1979 when aid workers heard that much of the food was being hoarded by the warlord. At this time the situation on the border was still too chaotic to do a proper census or to challenge In-Sakhan.

== Rivalry with neighboring camps ==
Map of Thai Border Refugee Camps, with roads and nearby Thai communities, distributed to aid workers by the American Refugee Committee in May 1984.

Rivalry with neighboring camps Nong Chan and Mak Mun led to frequent armed violence. In-Sakhan also had to defend the camp against the Khmer Rouge, who launched an attack on 4 January 1980 from nearby Phnom Chat. The camp was evacuated but the refugees quickly returned.

In late January 1980, ICRC and UNICEF attempted to bypass In-Sakhan and distribute food directly to Nong Samet's population (which they now estimated at 60,000), however without the warlord's cooperation this proved nearly impossible. In addition, it appeared that many Nong Samet residents were forced to go to Nong Chan to receive food because their rations were being confiscated by In-Sakhan's troops.

Accordingly, in late February 1980 aid agencies stopped distributing food in Nong Samet altogether. Two weeks later, UNICEF conducted a nutrition survey and found widespread levels of malnutrition, stunting and hunger in the camp population. ICRC decided to try direct distribution to locked warehouses inside the camp, and to allow section leaders to distribute rice to the population. A crude "hut census" of the camp was attempted, but an attack on Mak Mun Camp in late March forced several thousand refugees to flee to Nong Samet, invalidating the census.

Two days later, forces commanded by the Mak Mun warlord, Van Saren, attacked Nong Samet in retaliation. In a counterattack on 22 March, Van Saren was killed, possibly by the Thai military, and Mak Mun was closed on 11 April by the Thai government in an attempt to consolidate the population, most of which had already relocated to Nong Chan and Nong Samet.

In late May 1980 Nong Samet was moved to a site adjacent to the Prasaht Sdok Kok Thom, in an area with poor drainage and landmines left over from a previous conflict.

== Incorporation into the KPNLF ==
Map of Nong Samet Refugee Camp and the neighboring village of Ban Nong Samet, distributed to aid workers by the American Refugee Committee in 1984.

On July 12, 1980, troops commanded by Ung Chan Don, In-Sakhan's former ally, attacked Nong Samet and drove In-Sakhan to Aranyaprathet, where "on a calm Sunday evening, In-Sakhan surrendered to the Thai Third Infantry Battalion." He later joined Prince Norodom Sihanouk's Armée Nationale Sihanoukiste (ANS) forces. In-Sakhan was replaced by Om Luot (also known as Ta Luot or Siem Sam On) with Thou Thon acting as civilian administrator. Om Luot had declared his loyalty to the KPNLF in February 1979, but tensions with General Dien Del and General Sak Sutsakhan eventually led to Om Luot's murder on October 11, 1982. After this, Thou Thon became chief administrator of the camp. Nong Samet Camp soon became a primary recruiting location for Khmer People's National Liberation Armed Forces troops.

=== Thou Thon's leadership ===
Thou Thon was a model of strong yet considerate civilian leadership at a time when warlords controlled most of the border refugee population. According to Linda Mason and Roger Brown, who knew him in 1980:

The Khmer refugees in Nong Samet Camp owed much to him. He had organized the camp—building roads, digging ditches, cleaning up. He had eliminated much of the thievery that had kept the refugees nervous and frightened. He had helped organize an efficient distribution system so that everyone received rice… He was a hard worker… When he had organized the building of the feeding center, he did not just tell people what to do, he climbed up on the roof and started nailing down the lattice work on which the thatch would be placed. When ditches were dug, he was there with a hoe.

Thou Thon's brother Colonel Thou Thip had co-founded the KPNLF in Paris in 1978, together with Son Sann and Dien Del among others. Thou Thon also had a brother and a sister in New Zealand but he refused to accept their sponsorship offers. Unlike Thou Thip, Thou Thon maintained at best only a lukewarm relationship with Son Sann.

In 1983, at a time when Nong Samet was being terrorized nightly by violent acts of banditry, local policing was so ineffective that the bandits could brag about their exploits in the marketplace. Finally, after a particularly blatant act of violence, three bandits who had identified themselves in the market the day before were found with their throats cut at the edge of the camp. Banditry decreased significantly in camp after this. Thou Thon thus demonstrated his willingness to use summary execution as a means of maintaining order. This sent a message to the camp population as much as it did to would-be bandits, that security was a priority and that it would be enforced.

Thou Thon continued to administer Nong Samet after the camp was incorporated into Site Two in 1985.

=== Camp relocation in 1983 ===
The entire camp was moved again in January 1983 to somewhat higher ground just east of the village of Ban Nong Samet, on land considered to be on the Cambodian side of the border. This move was precipitated by accusations that Thailand was harboring anti-communist guerrillas on its territory, thereby aggravating the already complex political situation.

== Camp population ==
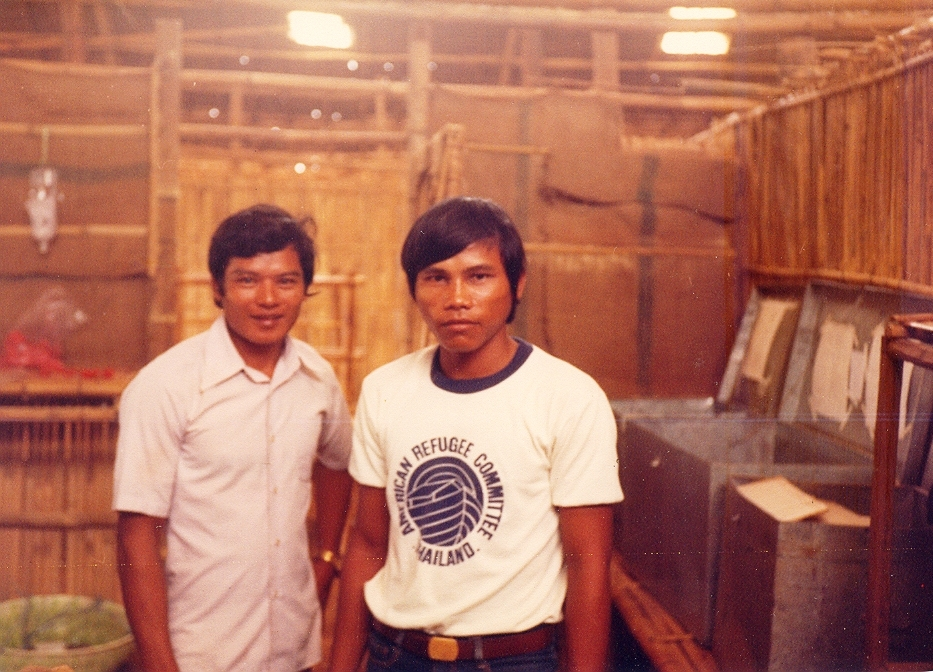
Cambodian medics trained by ARC at Nong Samet Refugee Camp, May 1984.

Nong Samet's official population estimate in 1979 was over 100,000, a figure that William Shawcross gives credence to, but Mason and Brown calculate that it probably fluctuated between 48,000 and 60,000. The American Refugee Committee's 1983 Annual Report numbered the population at "between 45,000 and 70,000," based on food distribution statistics, immunization records, and birth and death tallies, however this did not include KPNLF troops, who were exempt from aid, and may have constituted an additional 8,000 men.

=== Vietnamese refugees at NW82 ===
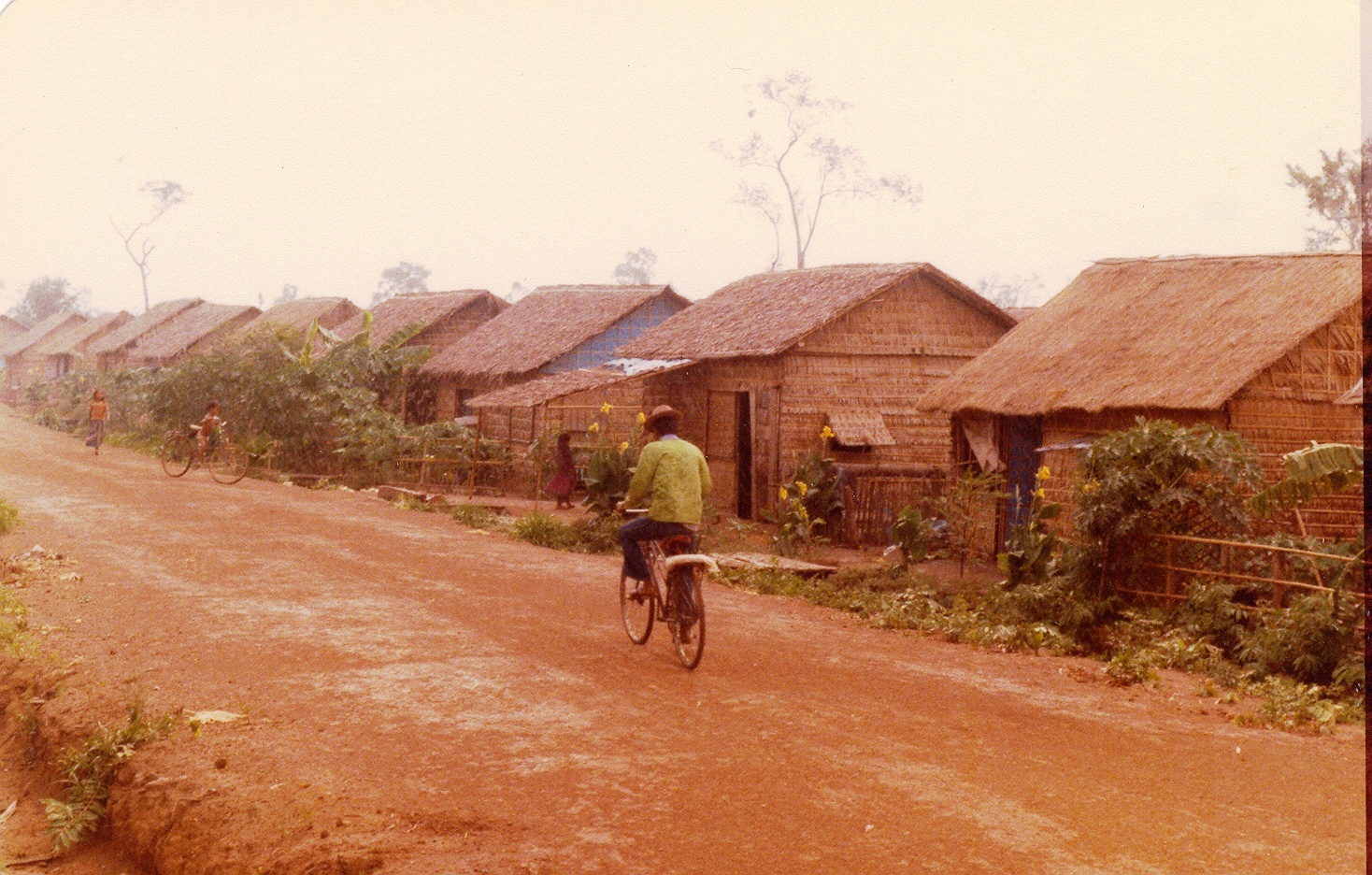
Typical refugee homes at Nong Samet, May 1984.

As of December 18, 1981, Nong Samet became home to about 700 Vietnamese refugees who were transferred from a special camp for "land refugees" who had crossed Cambodia from Vietnam and entered Thailand. They had been transferred from the nearby camp of NW9 and were housed in a separate section known as NW82 or 'the platform' because of a wooden platform built to keep the population off the swampy ground. By September 1982 there were more than 1,800 refugees in the crowded and unsanitary camp. Initially Thailand prevented foreign embassies from interviewing these refugees, however after repeated requests by the ICRC, this policy was reversed. The Intergovernmental Committee for Migration conducted preliminary screening of the 1,804 NW82 Vietnamese and coordinated efforts of the 15 countries willing to offer resettlement to the refugees. By January 28, 1983, when the first round of processing was completed, 1,713 of the refugees had received resettlement offers. The United States accepted just over 60 percent.

On February 9, 1983, NW82 was closed, and the remaining 122 occupants without resettlement offers were transferred temporarily to the Khao-I-Dang Holding Center.

== Camp services ==
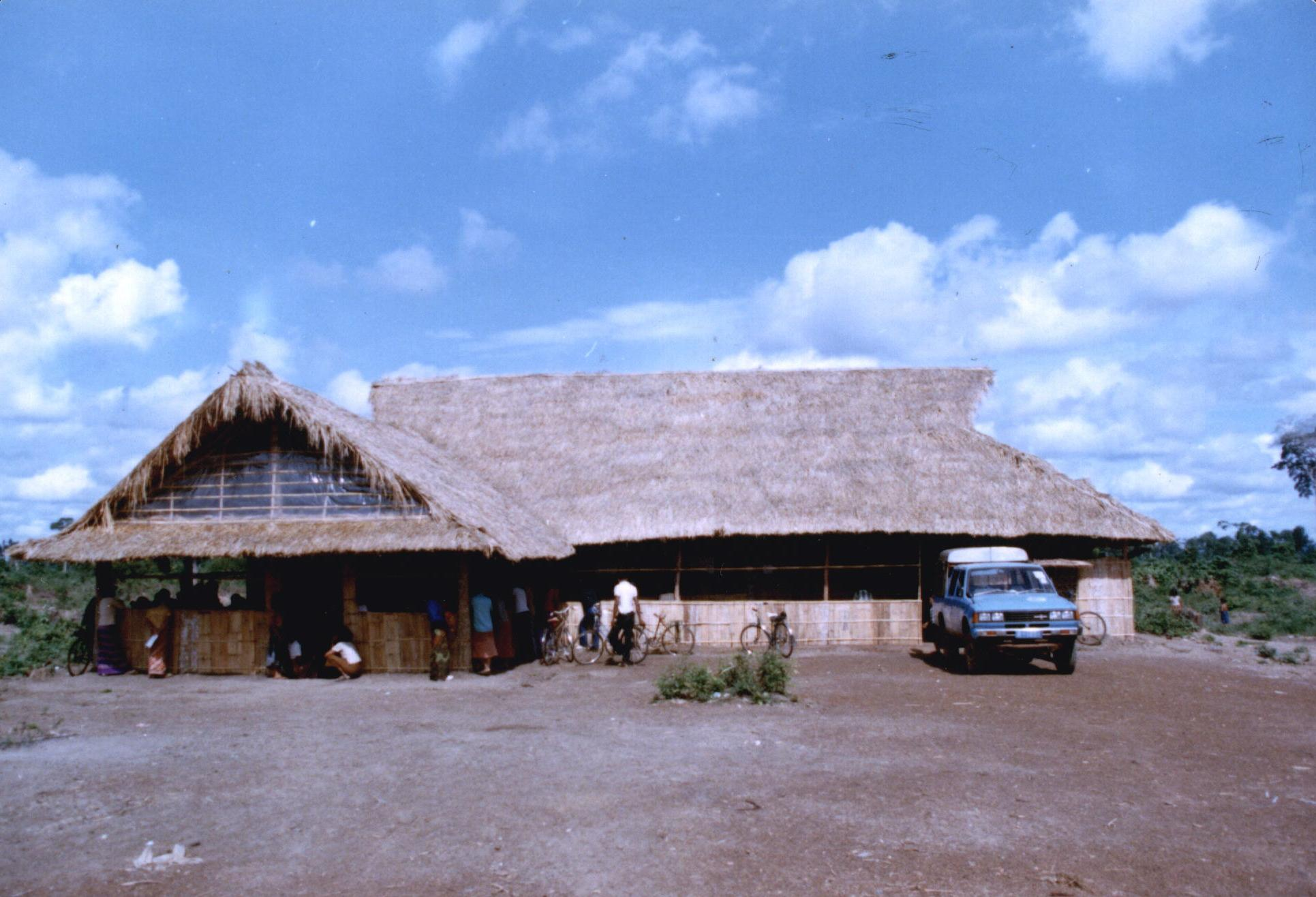
The American Refugee Committee's Outpatient Dept. 1, Nong Samet, May 1984.

Food distribution problems had been resolved by the aid agencies in 1980 and Nong Samet became a model camp for its organization and the quality of its health care services, which included a tuberculosis treatment program, established in spite of claims that the situation was still too unstable to permit long-term treatment. A 100-bed hospital with pediatrics, maternity and surgical facilities and two outpatient clinics were operated by the American Refugee Committee, which trained 150 Khmer medics, midwives, pharmacists and nurses. ARC also operated a traditional medicine clinic.

Food and some water were provided by the World Food Programme under the supervision of the United Nations Border Relief Operation (UNBRO). Deep wells also provided potable water for much of the camp.

Other services fluctuated over the years, but in September 1983 supplementary feeding was being handled by Catholic Relief Services (CRS), sanitation and maternal-child health by World Concern, physical rehabilitation by Handicap International, and security by UNBRO. CRS also operated a mobile dental team and the Japan International Volunteer Center (JVC) provided a weekly X-ray service.

=== Aid worker recollections ===
The "Old Temple", Prasaht Sdok Kok Thom just outside Nong Samet Refugee Camp, where refugee monks provided religious services to camp residents, May 1984.

Several aid workers have described their experiences at Nong Samet Camp, including Dr. Louis Braile:

There was really a palpable difference between Nong Samet and KID (Khao-I-Dang Holding Center). Perhaps it arose from the wilderness atmosphere. Perhaps it was the presence of the ancient ruins, or perhaps it was the fact that these people, unlike the KID residents, had little hope of expatriating.

Dr. Steven H. Miles, medical director for the American Refugee Committee, wrote:

Relief at the end of the Khmer Rouge has been replaced by fear of the present. There is a hard hopelessness here, much more so than in the past. Escape is not possible. Violence and corruption are pervasive. War is certain. Fear, a sense of extreme vulnerability, is the omnipresent emotion. My experience of Nong Samet in 1983 was overwhelmingly, searingly sad.

Robert C. Porter Jr. of the US Embassy in Bangkok wrote:

The Khmer camp at Nong Samet...always held the most exotic fascination and excitement for me.... A tall forest provided welcome shade. The stone ruins of an old Angkor-style Buddhist temple gave it a particularly Khmer air. While its early military leadership was among the more corrupt, disruptive and despicable, the camp was unusually well organized and tightly run.... It had an interesting population and a lively market. For a time in 1979 and 1980 it was the most populous Cambodian city on earth, far surpassing the then reawakening but still tiny Phnom Penh.

== The Vietnamese dry-season offensive of 1984 ==
In April 1984 the Vietnamese began preparing the K-5 border barrier and launched an attack on Ampil Camp to the northeast of Nong Samet, however the KPNLAF held firm, bringing in reinforcements and inflicting heavy casualties. The Vietnamese even left 200 of their own men to bleed to death on the slopes around the camp. Ampil Camp was destroyed in the fighting, forcing the KPNLF to relocate its headquarters. The Vietnamese assaulted Nong Chan Camp on November 21 and had occupied most of the deserted, burned-out camp by November 23. Sporadic fighting continued until the 30th when the KPNLAF withdrew most of its troops to Prey Chan (Site 6).

Nong Samet Camp was attacked and destroyed by the Vietnamese on Christmas Day, 1984. The attack began with shelling at 5:25 a.m., according to Soth Sour, the guard at the TB Clinic near section 2. KPNLAF troops held portions of the camp for about a week after this, but in the end it was abandoned. News reports initially claimed that around 100 civilians had been killed, but this was later changed to 55 resistance fighters and 63 civilians.

Kenneth Conboy surmises that the Vietnamese were anxious to make up for their embarrassing defeat at Ampil in early 1984, and that this led them to commit the entire 9th Division plus part of another: over 4,000 men, 18 artillery pieces and 27 T-54 tanks and armored personnel carriers participated in this assault.

Numerous KPNLF soldiers and officers, including General Dien Del, reported that during fighting at Nong Samet on December 27 the Vietnamese used a green-colored "nonlethal but powerful battlefield gas" which stunned its victims and caused nausea and frothing at the mouth.

== Camp relocation to Site Two ==
On the day of the attack, Nong Samet's population of 60,000 fled to the Red Hill evacuation site and was transported by bus on 20–22 January 1985 to Site 7 (Bang Poo or Bang Phu, 'Crab village'), a new camp created next to Khao-I-Dang Holding Center. On 29 September the population was transported to Site Two Refugee Camp in Ta Phraya.

At Site Two, Nong Samet's population maintained a separate section and its own identity, with many services and much of its administration unchanged.

== See also ==
- Cambodian humanitarian crisis
- Indochina refugee crisis
- Nong Chan Refugee Camp
- Sa Kaeo Refugee Camp
