= Nong Chan Refugee Camp =

Refugee camp on the Thai-Cambodian border in the 1980s

Nong Chan Camp 511
- Refugee camp
- Location in Thailand
- Coordinates: 13°49′55″N 102°44′00″E
- Country: Thailand
- Established by Cambodian refugees: mid-1950s
- Destroyed by the People's Army of Vietnam: 31 January 1983
- Rebuilt: February-May 1984
- Destroyed by the People's Army of Vietnam: 18 November 1984

Government
  - Type: Guerrilla Organizations: MOULINAKA, KPNLF
  - Military Commander: Kong Sileah (November–December 1979)
  - Military Commander: Chea Chhut (December 1979-November 1984)

Area
  - Total: 2.1 km^{2} (0.81 sq mi)

Population (January 1984)
  - Total: 13,000 to 30,000

Nong Chan Refugee Camp, near Nong Chan Village, Khok Sung District, Sa Kaeo Province, Thailand, was one of the earliest organized refugee camps on the Thai-Cambodian border, where thousands of Khmer refugees sought food and health care after fleeing the Cambodian-Vietnamese War. It was destroyed by the Vietnamese military in late 1984, after which its population was transferred to Site Two Refugee Camp.

Map of Thai Border Refugee Camps, with roads and nearby Thai communities, distributed to aid workers by the American Refugee Committee in May 1984.

== History ==
A Khmer Serei camp was established near the Thai village of Ban Nong Chan sometime in the 1950s by Cambodians opposed to the rule of Prince Norodom Sihanouk. It was populated mainly by bandits and smugglers until the mid-1970s, when refugees fleeing from the Khmer Rouge formed a resistance movement there. On June 8, 1979, the Thai military transported several thousand refugees from Nong Chan to the border near the temple of Preah Vihear where the refugees were forcibly repatriated into a minefield on the Cambodian side of the border.

In late August 1979 Kong Sileah, a former naval officer, established the MOULINAKA resistance force at Nong Chan. Kong Sileah insisted that his approximately 100 guerrillas stay separate from the 13,000 civilians in the camp; he became known for integrity in his dealings with aid agencies. Encouraged by the good order of the camp, the International Committee of the Red Cross (ICRC) built a hospital there.

On 8 November 1979, a fight broke out in the camp when a Thai soldier was accused of raping a Khmer woman and was shot to death. The Thai military commander Colonel Prachak Sawaengchit ordered his troops to shell Nong Chan (known at that time as Camp 511), killing about 100 refugees. The incident received international attention because U.S. First Lady Rosalynn Carter was scheduled to visit Sa Kaeo Refugee Camp on the following day.

== Robert Ashe's "Land Bridge" ==
=== Food distribution ===
In November 1979 Kong Sileah met with Robert Patrick Ashe, a five-year veteran of humanitarian work in Thailand and suggested that food should be distributed at Nong Chan for Cambodians to take home to the interior. This initiated the famous "land bridge", a fairly successful attempt to distribute food, farm tools and seeds to Khmers living inside Kampuchea. Starting on 12 December, Ashe and Kong Sileah organized orderly distributions using camp administrators to give between 10 and 30 kilograms of rice to people arriving from inside Cambodia. These travelers arrived on foot, by bicycle, and in oxcarts. By Christmas 1979 twelve truckloads of rice were being distributed daily to over 6,000 people.

Van Saren, a warlord in the neighboring camp of Mak Mun who had made a fortune selling rice that had been distributed by aid agencies, decided that Nong Chan represented a threat to his power, as the price of rice fell dramatically once the land bridge began operating. He attacked Nong Chan on 30 December, purportedly with the aid of the Royal Thai Army and burned down the hospital. Food distribution resumed a few days after Van Saren's attack, and by mid-January 10,000 people a day were receiving rice. Kong Sileah left the camp and moved with his soldiers into the interior of occupied Kampuchea, living in rustic conditions in the forest, a factor which may have contributed to his death from cerebral malaria on 16 August, 1980. After this, Nong Chan came under the control of Chea Chhut, a warlord with fewer scruples than Kong Sileah.

=== Seed distribution ===
In February 1980 CARE proposed distributing seed rice in addition to food rice. Numerous predictions of a widespread famine in Kampuchea spurred UNICEF, the Food and Agriculture Organization, ICRC, the World Food Programme, and several nongovernmental aid agencies to support the seed-distribution program. After a trial distribution of 220 tons of rice seeds at Nong Chan on 21 March, World Relief and CARE each distributed 2000 tons of rice seed to over 68,000 farmers in early April. Many farmers who received seed at Nong Chan complained that they did not have the tools with which to plant the rice. World Relief, Christian Outreach and Oxfam responded in May by distributing hoe heads, plow tips, rope, fishnets, and fishhooks, as well as oxcarts. During that month 340,000 people received food and seeds at Nong Chan.

UNICEF and the ICRC were initially opposed to a large seed distribution program because they feared that it would attract farmers permanently into the camps, having made the journey to the border, although others argued that It was the only way to provide farmers with an incentive to remain on the land. The ICRC was also particularly wary about running a large-scale operation without first assessing the attitude of the Heng Samrin government. ICRC therefore attempted to restrict hoarding and to keep the scale of the program small by imposing ceilings on both the total quantities of seed that could be distributed and on levels of distribution in any one day. UNICEF and WFP at first shared ICRC's caution but became more relaxed after it became clear that the Heng Samrin government had no strong objections to the program. Although the Vietnam-backed government in Phnom Penh refused to allow CARE and ICRC to distribute seed rice inside Kampuchea, officials did not prevent Khmer villagers from traveling to Nong Chan to receive rice, and in a few cases actually encouraged it.

=== What the Land Bridge achieved ===
The seed distribution at the land bridge finally ended on 20 June, having given out some 25,521 tons of seed, along with tools and even fertilizer. The 1980 harvest in Kampuchea, although less than half of prewar levels, far exceeded expectations. Approximately 50,000 tons of food rice were also handed out to over 700,000 Cambodians before the food distribution program ended on 23 January 1981. Although critics charge that much of this rice was resold or used to supply troops in both Thailand and Cambodia, the land bridge was considered a success, principally because it encouraged Cambodians to remain on their farms instead of moving to the refugee camps in Thailand. In mid-1980, Robert Patrick Ashe was awarded the MBE (Member of the Most Excellent Order of the British Empire) for his work among refugees.

== 1980 Vietnamese incursion ==
On 23 June 1980, about 200 Vietnamese soldiers attacked Mak Mun and Nong Chan, forcing hundreds of refugees back into Kampuchea and executing hundreds more who resisted. Khmer soldiers at Nong Chan put up a vigorous defense, but some 400 refugees were killed and another 458 were treated at Khao-I-Dang hospital. Nong Chan was later recaptured by Thai forces after the Vietnamese withdrew on June 24. Many refugees moved to the nearby Nong Samet Refugee Camp. On 26 June Robert Ashe, Dr. Pierre Perrin (ICRC Medical Coordinator) and two journalists (George Lienemann and Richard Franken) were captured by the Vietnamese and marched about 25 kilometers inside Kampuchea through torrential rain and with no shelter at night. Ashe later noted, "It was the first holiday I'd had in six months." Arriving in the Cambodian town of Nimitt he was interrogated by a Vietnamese officer as to whether food aid was going to anticommunist guerrillas, and after four days they were freed and allowed to walk over the bridge at the border back into Thailand.

== Nong Chan as a base for the KPNLAF ==
Towards the end of 1980 Chea Chhut was persuaded by General Dien Del to join forces with the Khmer People's National Liberation Front (KPNLF) and at the end of 1982 Nong Chan became the Khmer People's National Liberation Armed Forces's (KPNLAF) military headquarters, although Ampil Camp remained the administrative headquarters until it was destroyed in early 1985. Nong Chan housed the KPNLAF's 3rd, 7th and 9th battalions and a "Special Forces" unit commanded by Khmer Captain Pahn Tai that was being trained by the British SAS with arms and assistance from the Malaysian Army for sabotage operations inside Cambodia.

Because of its strategic importance to the KPNLAF, 4000 Vietnamese troops supported by artillery and T-54 tanks attacked Nong Chan again and destroyed it on January 31, 1983. Ground fighting was reported outside the camp between Vietnamese troops based in Cambodia and about 2000 KPNLF guerrillas. At the same time the Vietnamese kept up a steady barrage of shells, rockets and mortars, killing a 66-year-old Thai farmer and damaging several houses and a Buddhist temple in a neighboring Thai village. Meanwhile, MOULINAKA units were brushed aside, and KPNLF forces withdrew after a 36-hour fight. The Khao-I-Dang ICRC hospital received over 100 civilian wounded. Soon, however, the camp was reoccupied and rebuilt.

== Destruction of the camp ==
Between 1980 and 1984 the camp was a frequent target of Vietnamese attacks. It was finally assaulted by over 2000 Vietnamese troops from the People's Army of Vietnam's (PAVN) 9th Division on 18 November, 1984 and definitively abandoned as of 30 November. The camp's population of 30,000 refugees was evacuated to Site 3 (Ang Sila), a laterite quarry about four kilometers to the west. A new camp was established at Site 6 (Prey Chan). Many of these refugees ended up in Khao-I-Dang Holding Center, and the remainder were resettled at Site Two Refugee Camp in mid-1985.

== See also ==
- Cambodian humanitarian crisis
- Indochina refugee crisis
- Nong Samet Refugee Camp
- Sa Kaeo Refugee Camp
- Site Two Refugee Camp
- Khao-I-Dang
