= Cambodian humanitarian crisis =

1969–1993 humanitarian crisis

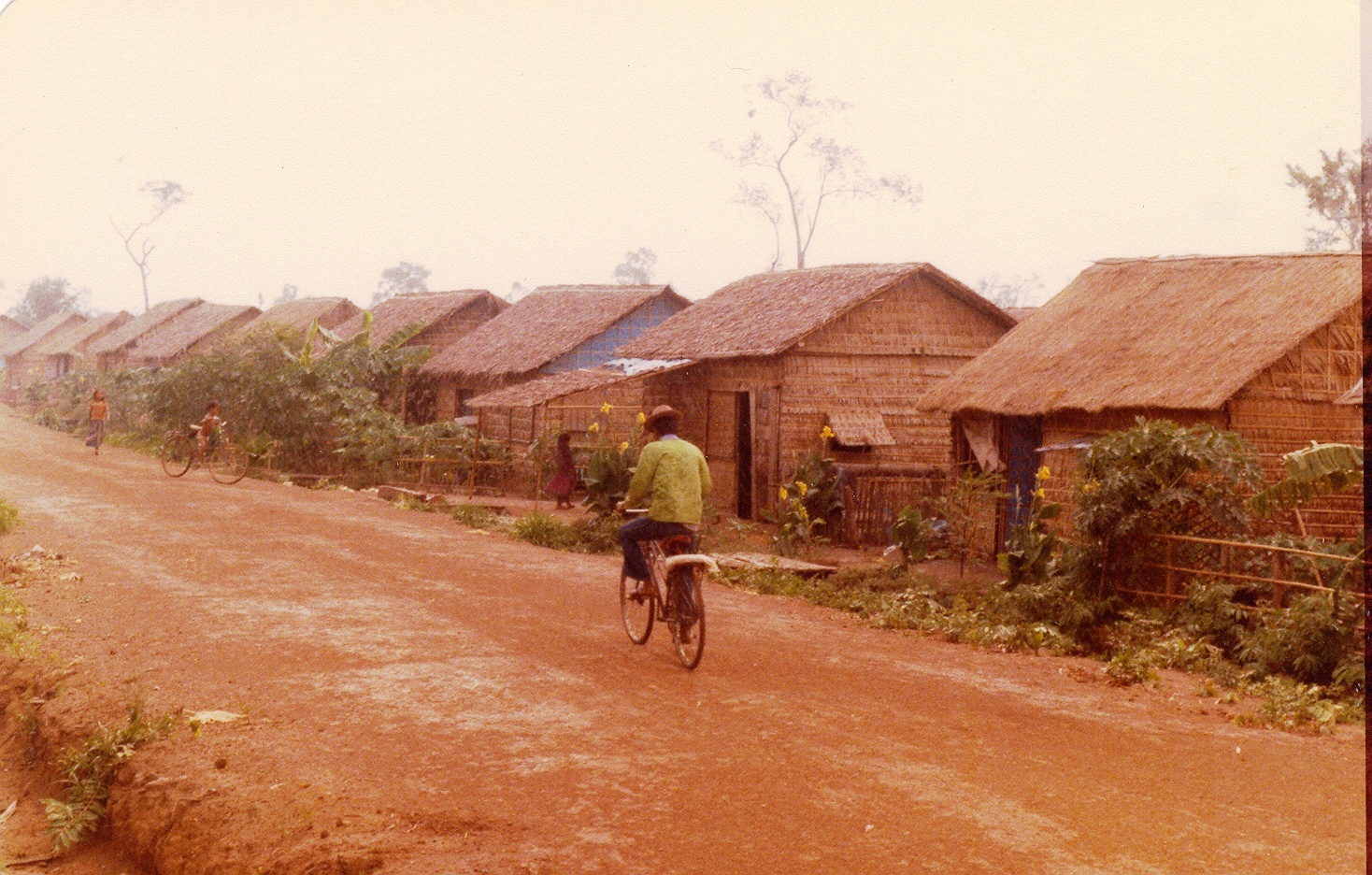
Nong Samet Refugee Camp on the Cambodia-Thailand border in 1984.

The Cambodian humanitarian crisis from 1969 to 1993 consisted of a series of related events which resulted in the death, displacement, or resettlement abroad of millions of Cambodians.

The crisis had several phases. First was the Cambodian Civil War between the Lon Nol government and the Khmer Rouge from 1970 to 1975. This phase was also marked by intensive United States bombing from 1969 to 1973 of the Khmer Rouge sanctuaries and bases inside Cambodia of the North Vietnamese Army as part of its strategy to win the Vietnam War. The second phase was the rule of the Khmer Rouge from 1975 to 1979. The Khmer Rouge murdered or starved about one-fourth of the 8 million population in the Cambodian genocide.

In December 1978, Vietnam invaded Cambodia and overthrew the Khmer Rouge. Vietnam and the Cambodian government it created ruled the country for the next 12 years. The Khmer Rouge and other groups fought a guerrilla war against the Vietnamese occupiers and the Cambodian government. In 1979 and 1980, the chaos caused hundreds of thousands of Cambodians to rush to the border with Thailand to escape the violence and to avoid the famine which threatened Cambodia. Humanitarian organizations coped with the crisis with the "land bridge", one of the largest humanitarian aid efforts ever undertaken.

From 1981 to 1991, the guerrilla war against the Vietnamese and Cambodian government continued and hundreds of thousands of Cambodians continued to reside in refugee camps in Thailand or on the border with Thailand. About 260,000 of the refugees were resettled abroad, more than one-half of them in the United States. The final phase of the Cambodian humanitarian crisis was its resolution in 1991–1993. Vietnam withdrew from the country and the United Nations led Cambodia toward an elected government and repatriated 360,000 Cambodians, emptying and closing the refugee camps.

== Civil War and U.S. bombing ==
In 1969, the United States began extensive bombing of North Vietnamese sanctuaries and bases, mostly in eastern Cambodia. The bombing later expanded to target the Khmer Rouge. During the same time period, the Khmer Rouge began its rise as an indigenous guerrilla force to challenge the government. The impact and interrelationship of the bombing and the growth of the Khmer Rouge is disputed by historians. On March 18, 1970, Lon Nol overthrew the government of Prince Norodom Sihanouk. Lon Nol initiated an unsuccessful campaign to oust the soldiers and cut the supply lines of the North Vietnamese in Cambodia. In response, the NVA poured out of the sanctuaries and captured additional Cambodian territory. This territory was handed over the Khmer Rouge. Around the same time, US and South Vietnamese troops initiated the Cambodian Campaign to oust North Vietnamese troops from the sanctuaries.

The humanitarian consequences of U.S. bombing were high. The U.S. may have dropped a tonnage of bombs on Cambodia nearly equal to all the bombs dropped by the U.S. in World War II. Estimates of Cambodian military and civilian deaths resulting from the 1969-1973 bombing range from 40,000 to more than 150,000.

The impact of the Khmer Rouge on the rural population was severe. Their tactics were "terror, violence, and force." The civil war forced many Cambodians in the countryside to flee to the cities for safety. The population of Phnom Penh increased from 600,000 to more than 2 million. Resupply of the city by land and sea was cut off by the Khmer Rouge and, by the time the government surrendered on April 17, 1975, many of the inhabitants were starving. During the civil war, 200,000 to 300,000 Cambodians died from all causes.

== Khmer Rouge rule ==
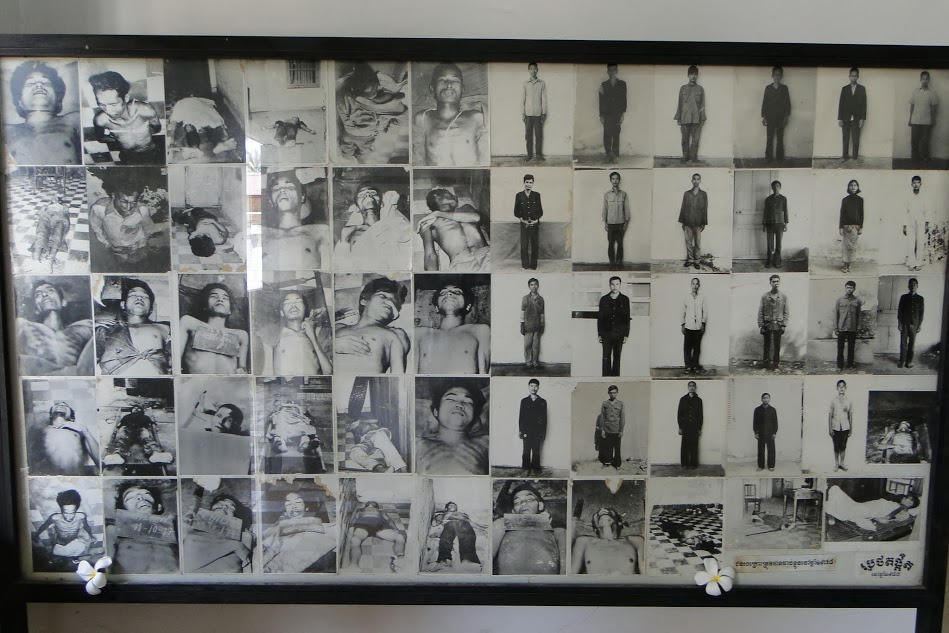
Images of victims of the Cambodian genocide in Tuol Sleng Genocide Museum.

The first action of the Khmer Rouge on taking power in Phnom Penh was to order the populace to abandon the cities of Cambodia. "One third to one half of the population of the country was forced by the communists at gunpoint to walk into the countryside in tropical temperatures and monsoon rains without provision for food, water, shelter, physical security, or medical care." The urban dwellers who survived were forced to create new settlements in the jungle. Former civil servants and soldiers of the Lon Nol government were executed.

The death toll from execution, starvation, and disease during the almost four years of Khmer Rouge rule is usually estimated at between one and three million persons.

== Vietnamese invasion and famine ==
On December 25, 1978, Vietnam invaded Cambodia and soon took over most of the country, establishing a pro-Vietnamese government to rule Cambodia, which they called the People's Republic of Kampuchea. Tens of thousands of Cambodians were killed in the invasion or executed by the new government. The remnants of the Khmer Rouge retreated to the Cardamom Mountains near the border with Thailand and other resistance movements sprang up in western Cambodia.

During the rule of the Khmer Rouge only a few thousand Cambodians had been able to escape Cambodia and take refuge in Thailand. With the Vietnamese invasion, the floodgates opened and Cambodians attempted to cross into Thailand in large numbers. In June 1979, the Thai government forced more than 40,000 Cambodian refugees back into Cambodia at the temple of Preah Vihear. 3,000 or more Cambodians were killed attempting to cross a minefield. The Preah Vihear incident stimulated the international humanitarian community into action to help Cambodians who often arrived at the Thai border in the last extremity of starvation.

By the end of 1979, Vietnamese offensives against the Khmer Rouge and other opposition groups plus a threatened famine in Cambodia had forced 750,000 people, many of them combatants against the Vietnamese, to the Thai border. Most were prevented from entering Thailand, but resided in makeshift camps along the border, although more than 100,000 were inside Thailand at Khao-I-Dang Holding Center. Many of the new arrivals were malnourished or starving.

== The land bridge ==
Fighting between the Vietnamese and anti-Vietnamese forces disrupted Cambodian rice production in 1979. A country-wide famine was anticipated in 1980. Aid agencies estimated that up to 2.5 million Cambodians were at risk of starvation. The pro-Vietnamese government in Phnom Penh demanded that all humanitarian aid be channeled through it, and some UN and aid organizations attempted to work with the government. However, there were reports of "delivery and distribution problems".

The "land bridge", conceived by aid worker Robert Patrick Ashe, was a relief measure that bypassed the Phnom Penh government. Humanitarian organizations and international aid agencies brought rice and other rice seed to Nong Chan Refugee Camp on the Cambodian border in Thailand and distributed the rice to Cambodians who came to the border. "Vast numbers of Cambodians with oxcarts and bicycles...came to the border every day" and were given sacks of rice to take home with them.

The land bridge was a "huge and successful operation," distributing together with other aid operations, including rice distribution to occupants of urban Phnom Penh, about 150,000 metric tons of rice, other food, and rice seed to Cambodians from December 1979 to September 1980.

While the land bridge was successful in helping to avert what appeared to be an impending famine in Cambodia, it was controversial among aid agencies. Some aid agencies favored cooperation with the government in Phnom Penh and accused the land bridge of encouraging a black market in food and assisting anti-government forces, including the Khmer Rouge. The impact of the land bridge can not be fully measured as there was no means of monitoring the end use of the food it distributed.

== Resettlement and refugee camps ==
Map of Thai Border Refugee Camps, with roads and nearby Thai communities, distributed to aid workers by the American Refugee Committee in May 1984.

The border camps fluctuated in size during the 1980s depending upon the intensity of fighting inside Cambodia. Combatants took shelter in the border camps and both Vietnamese and Cambodian government forces frequently shelled the camps. Meanwhile, at Khao-I-Dang and other refugee camps a few miles inside Thailand, Cambodians, mostly urban middle-class survivors of the Khmer Rouge, hoped for resettlement abroad. Khao-I-Dang reached a peak population of 160,000 in March 1980, but with resettlement, repatriation (sometimes involuntary), and transfer to other camps the population declined to 40,000 by December 1982 and the camp took on a status described as "the most elaborately serviced refugee camp in the world." Site Two Refugee Camp grew to a population of 160,000 in 1987. Both refugee and border camps were characterized by fighting among political factions, violence, rape, depression, and inactivity. The refugee camps were declared closed to new arrivals by the government of Thailand, but Cambodians gained access through bribery or being smuggled into the camps.

Many of the Cambodians in the refugee and border camps remained there for years, fearful of returning to their country and desiring resettlement abroad. A total of 260,000 Cambodians would be resettled between 1975 and 1997, mostly in the United States (153,000) and France (53,000).

== Repatriation ==
In October 1991, a comprehensive peace agreement was reached between the contending parties in Cambodia which called for the withdrawal of Vietnamese military forces and the creation of the United Nations Transitional Authority in Cambodia (UNTAC) with the responsibility of enforcing a ceasefire, organizing elections for a new Cambodian government, and repatriating Cambodians still in refugee camps in Thailand or in border camps.

UNHCR supervised the repatriation effort which resulted in 360,000 Cambodians returning to the country from refugee and border camps in Thailand. Khao-I-Dang and other refugee camps were closed. Their remaining population was transferred to Site Two which was closed in mid-1993 after its population was repatriated to Cambodia

Elections in May 1993 established an independent Cambodian government and UNTAC was dismantled. A sizable number of UN and humanitarian aid workers remained in the country to promote human rights and democracy and support reconstruction and economic development.

== See also ==
- Outline of the Cambodian genocide
- Bibliography of the Cambodian genocide
- Concerts for the People of Kampuchea
- Indochina refugee crisis
- Khao-I-Dang Holding Center
- Nong Samet Refugee Camp
- Nong Chan Refugee Camp
- Site Two Refugee Camp
- Sa Kaeo Refugee Camp
- United Nations Border Relief Operation
