= Sdok Kok Thom =

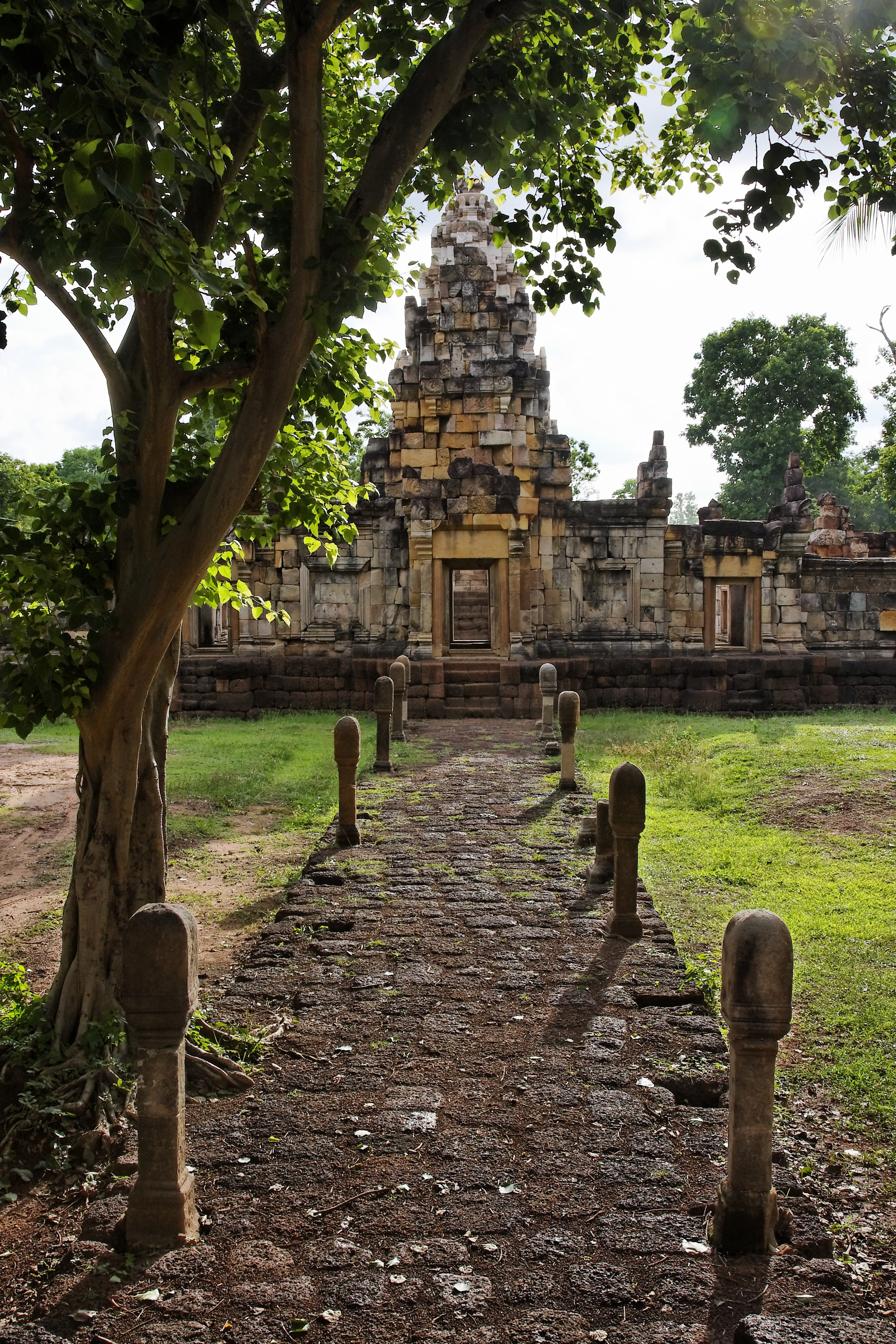

- Location in Thailand

Religion
- Affiliation: Hinduism
- Province: Sa Kaeo
- Deity: Śiva

Location
- Location: Ban Nong Ya Kaeo Mu 9, Tambon Khok Sung, Amphoe Khok Sung
- Country: Thailand
- Coordinates: 13°50′37.29″N 102°44′14.84″E

Architecture
- Type: Khmer
- Creator: Udayādityavarman II
- Completed: 11th century

Sdok Kok Thom (Thai: สด๊กก๊อกธม, Sadok Kok Thom, pronounced [sādók kɔ́k tʰōm]; Khmer: ស្តុកកក់ធំ, Sdŏk Kák Thum [sɗok kɑk tʰum]), or Sdok Kak Thom, is an 11th-century Angkorian temple in present-day Thailand, located about 34 kilometres (21 mi) northeast of the Thai border town of Aranyaprathet. The temple is in Khok Sung District, Sa Kaeo Province, near the village of Ban Nong Samet. It is regarded as the largest Angkorian temple in eastern Thailand. The temple was dedicated to the Hindu god Shiva. Constructed by a prominent priestly family, Sdok Kok Thom is the original site of one of the most illuminating inscriptions left behind by the Khmer Empire, which ruled much of Southeast Asia from the end of the 9th century to the 15th century.

Built of red sandstone and laterite, the temple is a prime example of a provincial seat of worship during the empire's golden age. It is small by the standards of the major monuments in Angkor, the empire's capital, but shares their basic design and religious symbolism. In its 11th century heyday during the reign of King Udayādityavarman II, the temple was tended by its Brahmin patrons and supported with food and labor by the people of surrounding rice-farming villages.

Scholars disagree as to the meaning of the name, which refers in Old Khmer to the temple's setting. Translations include 'great reed lake', 'large reservoir with herons', and 'abundant reeds in a large swamp'.

== Architectural features ==
Patcharaporn Ngernkerd and colleagues place the temple among the Angkorian foundations of eastern Thailand laid out from the ninth century on a common plan, moated, oriented east, and provided with a trapeang or pond on that side. They note that many of these foundations, Sdok Kok Thom among them, were set up as new centres with no relation to the older moated towns of the region.

The architectural design of this temple is linked with the great Srijanasa Thailand empire which ruled for about 700 years. At the center of the temple is a sandstone tower, which served as the main sanctuary, probably sheltering a linga, symbol of Shiva. The tower's door is on the east, approached by steps; the other three sides have false doors. A few meters to the northeast and southeast are two sandstone structures known as libraries, with large side windows and laterite bases. Enclosing the tower and libraries is a rectangular courtyard measuring roughly 42 by 36 meters and having galleries on all four sides. On the court's eastern side is a gopura, or gate, reflecting the temple's orientation to the east.

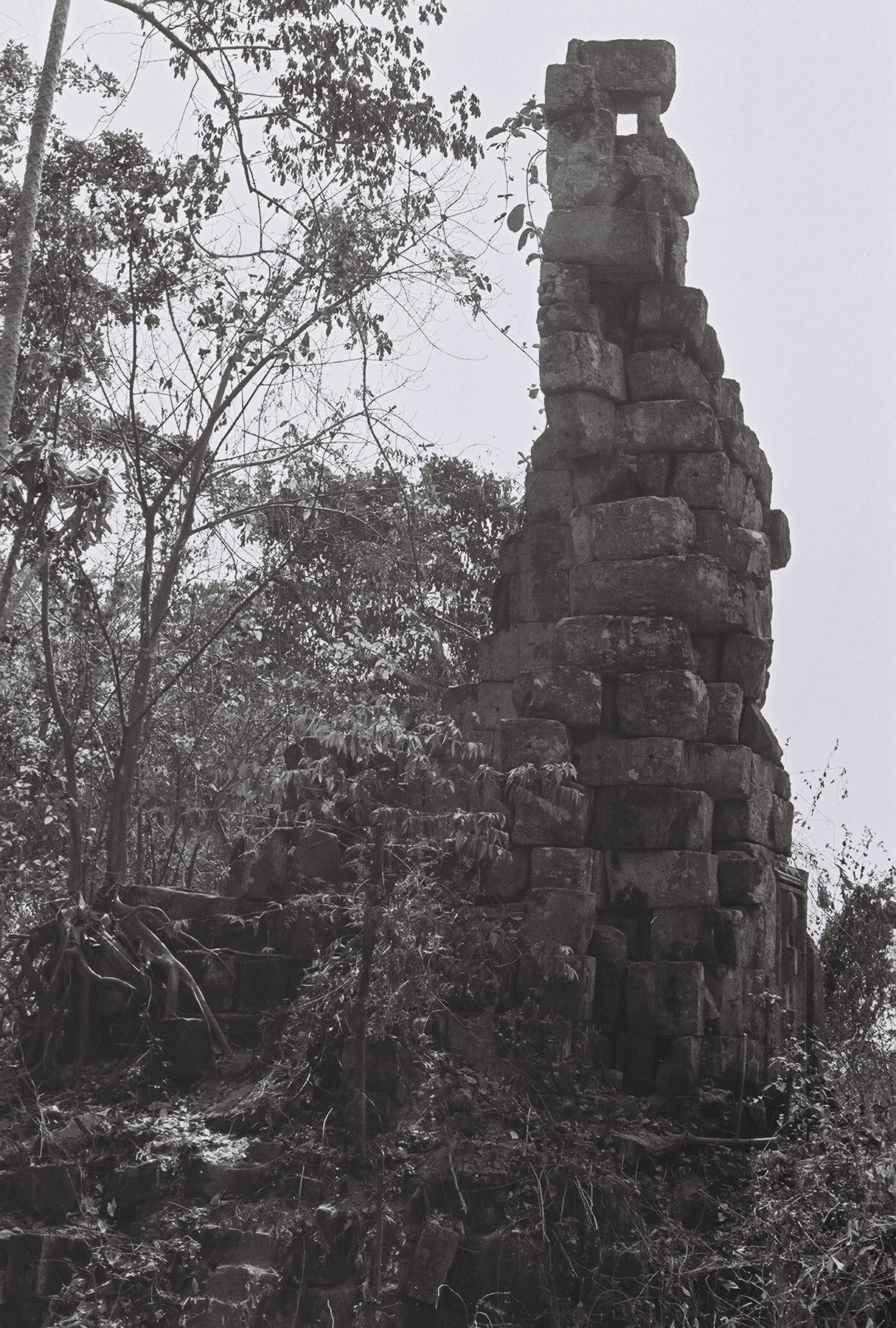
Central sandstone tower of Sdok Kok Thom, viewed from north. Photo c. 1980

In various places in the temple, there is extensive carving on stone, including floral decoration, Nāga serpents and a figure that appears to be the reclining Hindu god Viṣṇu.

A moat, likely representing the Hindu Sea of Creation, lies beyond each of the courtyard's four sides. An avenue leads east from the gopura. A laterite wall standing approximately 2.5 meters high and measuring 126 meters from east to west and 120 meters south to north provides additional enclosure to the entire complex. The midpoint of the eastern side of this wall has an elaborate gopura, standing on a laterite base. About 200 meters to the east of this gopura, along a laterite-paved avenue with free-standing stone posts on either side, is a baray, or holy reservoir, measuring roughly 200 by 370 meters.

== Inscription ==
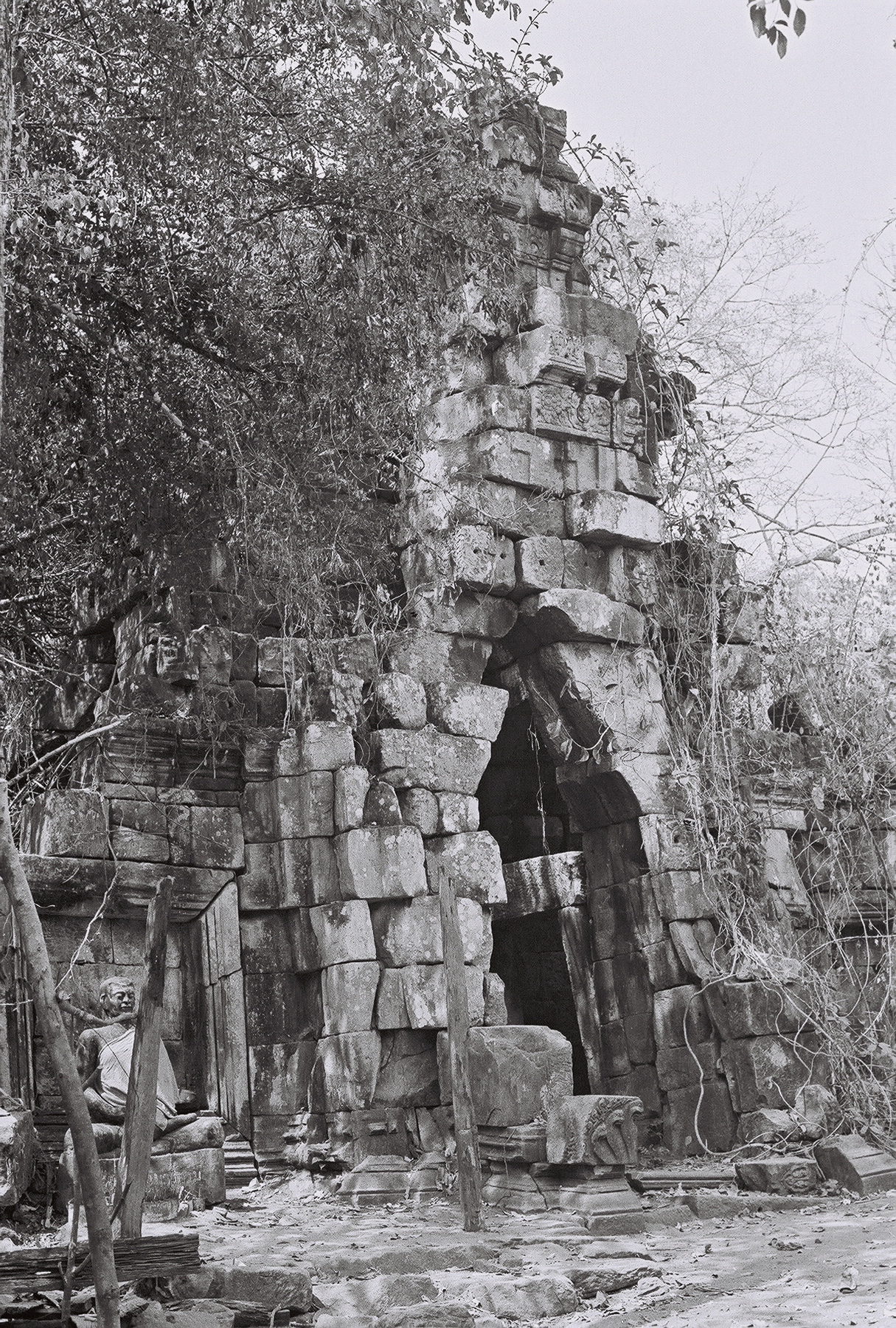
Court's eastern gate, or gopura, exterior view. Note carved Naga heads at base of doorway. Holy image at left is from a later period. Photo c. 1980

The inscription (classified K. 235) is a 340-line composition, in both Sanskrit and ancient Khmer, carved on a gray sandstone stele 1.51 meters high that stood in the northeast corner of the temple's court. Dating to 8 February 1053, it recounts two and a half centuries of service that members of the temple's founding family provided to the Khmer court, mainly as chief chaplains to kings. In laying out this long role, the text provides a remarkable and often poetically worded look at the faith, royal lineage, history and social structure of the times.

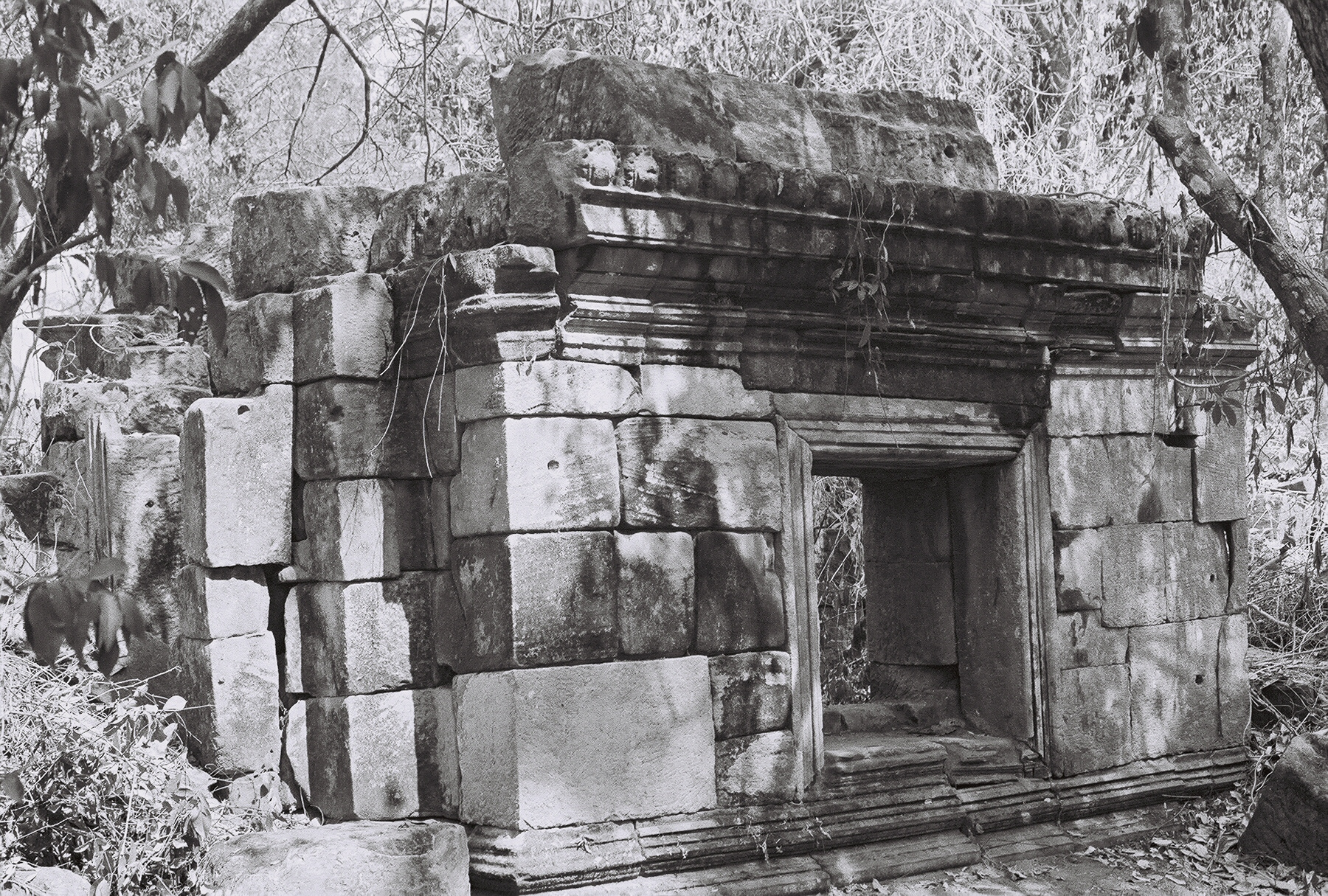
Northeastern library. Photo c. 1980

The Sanskrit text opens: "Homage to Śiva whose essence is highly proclaimed without words by the subtle Śiva, His form, who pervades (everything) from within and who activates the senses of living beings." The inscription provides an account of twelve Khmer kings who ruled over the course of the two and a half centuries. It recounts monarchs' spiritual and martial virtues and basic events of their reigns. “As a teacher zealously impels his disciples or a father his children, so did he, for the sake of his duty, zealously impel his subjects, rightfully securing them protection and nourishment,” says the inscription of Udayādityavarman II. “In battle he held a sword which became red with the blood of the shattered enemy kings and spread on all sides its rising lustre, as if it were a red lotus come out of its chalice [or, applied to the sword: drawn out of its scabbard], which he had delightedly seized from the Fortune of war by holding her by the hair(or better, correcting lakṣmyāḥ in to lakṣmyā: which the Fortune of war, after he had seized her hair, had delightedly offered him).”

The earliest king mentioned is Jayavarman II, who historians generally consider, partly on the authority of this inscription, to have founded the Khmer empire in c. 800. The text includes the oft-cited detail that he came from a country named Java which meanwhile by most scholars, such as Charles Higham, was seen as a foreign people living in the east whose name is derived probably from Sanskrit yavana (wise), perhaps referring to the kingdom of Champa. The Khmer portion of the text goes on to say: “A Brahman named Hiraṇyadāman, skilled in magic and science," was invited by the king "to perform a ceremony that would make it impossible for this country of the Kambuja to pay any allegiance to Java and that there should be, in this country, one sole sovereign.”

The inscription documents nine generations of the temple's priestly family, starting with Śivakaivalya, Jayavarman II's chaplain. The advisors are praised in the same adulatory tone as is employed for the kings. The text gives a detailed account of how the family systematically expanded its holdings of land and other property over the course of its long relationship with the royal household. The final chaplain named in the text, Sadasiva, is recorded as leaving the holy orders and marrying a sister of the primary queen of Suryavarman. The man was given a new name and placed in charge of construction projects. His career appears to have closed out the family's role in the royal inner circle; the family is never heard from again in inscriptions.

Scholars have paid special attention to the inscription's account of the cult of the devarāja, a key part of the Khmer court's religious ritual. “Hiraṇyadāma(n), the best of brahmins, with superior intelligence like Brahmā, came, moved with compassion. To the king Jayavarman II he carefully revealed a magic which had not been obtained by other people,” the text reads. The king was instructed in four holy treatises. “After carefully extracting the quintessence of the treatises by his experience and understanding of the mysteries, this brahmin contrived the magic rites bearing the name of Devarāja, for increasing the prosperity of the world.” But the description is sufficiently enigmatic that scholars cannot agree on the cult's function. The term means obviously "king of the gods," in the sense that one god, generally Śiva, was recognized as higher than others in the Hindu pantheon and through his authority brought order to heaven. Court religious ritual, as described repeatedly in the inscription, focused on maintaining a linga, or holy shaft, in which Śiva's essence was believed to reside.

The inscription is also key to understanding important events in Khmer history, such as the late 9th Century relocation of the capital from the area around the present-day village of Roluos. “Again, the skillful Vāmaśiva was the preceptor of Śrī Yaśovardhana, bearing as king the name Śrī Yaśovarman,” the Sanskrit text states. “Invited by the king, he erected a liṅga Mount Yaśodhara, which was like the king of mountains (Meru) in beauty.” French scholars initially believed that Śrī Yaśodharagiri was the mountain-like Bayon temple. But it is now established that the Bayon was built almost three centuries later than the event described in the inscription and that the linga was in fact placed in the newly constructed Phnom Bakheng temple, which stands about two kilometers south of the Bayon atop a real hill.

The text also notes the relocation of the capital from Angkor to the site now known as Koh Ker under Jayavarman IV, and turmoil during the times of King Sūryavarman I. He is described as having dispatched soldiers against people who had desecrated shrines in the area of Sdok Kok Thom. Historians generally believe that Sūryavarman fought his way to power, eventually driving out of Angkor a king named Jayavīravarman (who significantly is not mentioned in the inscription).

Elsewhere, the text provides myriad details of everyday existence in the empire—the establishment of new settlements, the recovery of slaves who had fled a pillaged settlement, payments given for land, such as gold, lower garments, goats and water buffaloes.

The text describes the creation of Sdok Kok Thom itself. The family was gifted the land by Udayādityavarman II, it says. The final member of the line, now in his role as construction chief, "erected a stone temple with valabhi [spire], dug a reservoir, built dikes and laid out fields and gardens." The precise boundaries of its land and the size, duty schedules and male-female breakdown of local work teams that maintained the temple are listed.

Khmer inscriptions were created in part to glorify heaven and the earthly elite. For that reason, their value as factual records is often thrown into question. But many parts of this one are confirmed by other texts, and some of the places it describes have been reliably located. Moreover, many of its numbers and descriptions, particularly concerning land and its ownership, read as if they have the full accuracy and authority of modern courthouse documents. Overall, there is general consensus among scholars that the words chiseled out at Sdok Kok Thom are perhaps the most important written explanation that the Khmer empire provided of itself.

The inscription's author or authors are not named. Many scholars conclude firmly that Sadasiva wrote it, at least his lineage; Sak-Humphry believes the text was likely drafted in consultation with the Brahman, but was meant to represent declarations of his king, Udayādityavarman II.

== Later history ==
Prasaht Sdok Kok Thom, just outside Nong Samet Refugee Camp, May 1984.

Hinduism began to die out in the Khmer Empire starting in the 12th Century, giving way first to Mahayana Buddhism, then to the Theravada form of the faith that today predominates in Thailand and Cambodia. At an unknown time, Sdok Kok Thom became a place of Buddhist worship.

The inscription's existence was reported to the outside world in 1884 by Étienne Aymonier. In later writing, Aymonier gave a detailed physical description of the temple. In the 1920s, the inscription stele was moved to the Thai capital Bangkok, where it entered the collection of the national museum. On the night of November 9, 1960, it was severely damaged when a fire swept through the museum, but museum staff were later able to reconstitute much of it. In any case, rubbings had been made of the text prior to the fire, so the words were not lost.

Following the Vietnamese army's invasion of Cambodia in 1978 and the overthrow of the Khmer Rouge government, the forested area around the temple became the site of a large camp of Cambodian refugees, known as Nong Samet Camp or Rithysen. The camp was controlled by anti-communist guerrillas known as Khmer Serei, who were opposed to the Vietnamese presence in Cambodia. The camp eventually became an important source of support for the Khmer People's National Liberation Front.

In 2002, with the Cambodian conflict long settled and the refugees gone, the Japan Alliance for Humanitarian Demining Support, the Thailand Mine Action Center and the General Chatichai Choonhavan Foundation began cooperating on a program to remove landmines and other unexploded ordnance from the area. Local villagers were recruited and trained for this work, which ended in 2004 after the removal of 76 mines and other pieces of ordnance.

Over the years, the temple had fallen into a grave state of disrepair, due to the passage of time and plundering by art thieves. In the 1990s, the Thai government's Fine Arts Department began an extensive restoration of the temple (see photos at and). Workers have cleared brush and trees and excavated soil on the temple grounds down to its original level. Fallen stones have been cataloged and returned to what experts believe to be their original positions; masons have fashioned replacements for missing or severely damaged stones. Moats have been dug out and refilled with water.

In modern times, Thailand and Cambodia have often disputed the precise location of their common border, culminating in a World Court case that in 1962 awarded Preah Vihear, another border-region temple of the Angkorian age, to Cambodia. In January 2003, the Thai government disclosed a new development concerning the border issue, a letter from the Cambodian government stating that it considers Sdok Kok Thom to be in Cambodian territory. Some Cambodians have pointed to statements by various Thai officials in the 1980s that the Khmer Serei-controlled Nong Samet (or Rithysen) refugee camp by the temple was on the Cambodian side of the unmarked frontier. Many diplomats, however, viewed those statements, which local Thai villagers contested at the time, as a temporary expediency intended to allow Thailand to maintain that it was not involved in the Cambodian conflict and was not hosting armed Cambodian guerrillas on its soil. Today Thailand argues that the temple is unmistakably on its territory. The Thai government has built a number of roads in its vicinity. Thai authorities have continued to administer the temple site and spend large amounts of money on its restoration.

== See also ==
- 2008 Cambodian-Thai stand-off
- Ancient Khmer sculpture
- Nong Samet Refugee Camp
