= United Nations Border Relief Operation =

- UNBRO Logo
- Abbreviation: UNBRO
- Formation: 1 January 1982
- Dissolved: December 2001
- Purpose: Humanitarian aid
- Location: Bangkok, Thailand
- Region served: Thai-Cambodian Border
- Special Representative for Coordination of Cambodian Humanitarian Assistance Programs: Sir Robert Jackson
- Parent organization: United Nations

The United Nations Border Relief Operation (UNBRO) was a donor-nation funded relief effort for Cambodian refugees and others affected by years of warfare along the Thai-Cambodian border. It functioned from 1982 until 2001.

== Establishment ==
In January 1979, following the ouster of the Khmer Rouge from power by invading Vietnamese forces, hundreds of thousands of Cambodians sought food and shelter along the Thai-Cambodian border, triggering calls for international relief efforts. Initially a consortium of international agencies known as the "Joint Mission" and consisting of UNICEF, the ICRC, UNHCR, and the WFP took responsibility for food distribution, health care, camp construction and sanitation along with considerable support from the Royal Thai Government. However it soon became clear that humanitarian aid provided at camps such as Sa Kaeo would permit the Khmer Rouge to recover from their near-defeat at the hands of the Vietnamese, with a protracted civil war as the likely result. Because of this and ongoing conflicts with other aid agencies, ICRC and then UNICEF reduced their role in the management of refugee relief services on the border. UNHCR worked only with residents of holding centers such as Khao-I-Dang and Phanat Nikhom and provided no services in the border camps.

In January 1982, UNBRO was established to coordinate border relief operations under the direction of the Special Representative of the Secretary General of the United Nations for Coordination of Cambodian Humanitarian Assistance Programs (OSRSG), then headed by Sir Robert Jackson. Known originally as "WFP-UNBRO", its first director was the UNDP's Resident Coordinator in Bangkok, Winston R. Prattley, who also served as WFP representative. Because the operation had no staff at the beginning, UNICEF agreed to a six-month loan of its Kampuchean Emergency Unit until UNBRO could hire its own people.

UNBRO was a temporary agency, created by the UN General Assembly to address a specific crisis. It had a mandate but no charter or independent governing council. Nor did it have an independent budget; it had to rely on the support of donor countries from the General Assembly, solicited through pledges at donor meetings twice a year. UNBRO received its monetary and in-kind donations primarily from the United States, the European Commission, Japan, France, the United Kingdom, Australia and Canada.

== Scope of operations ==
=== Guiding principles ===
UNBRO operated on the basis of five working principles, laid out in an internal memo on policy guidelines dated July 1982. These principles were revised and updated in an internal memo on policy guidelines dated 2 August 1989 .

First, UNBRO was a humanitarian operation which remained neutral in areas of religion, politics and nationalistic alignment. This meant that assistance was to be provided equally to all full-time residents of UNBRO-assisted camps, regardless of their political affiliation.

Second, UNBRO camps were to be managed by the Khmers as much as circumstances on the border allowed. UNBRO recognized a civilian administration consisting of a chief administrator and his deputies, the Khmer Women's Association, section leaders, and various administrative committees.

Third, the Articles of the Universal Declaration of Human Rights were to be used as much as possible as a guideline for all aspects of camp life. This meant that no one was to be removed by force from an UNBRO camp for any reason; free thought, free speech and free access to education and information should be guaranteed for all; the camps should be free of political or any other kind of coercion; and protection and justice for camp residents should be provided by the Khmer Police and an internal justice system.

Fourth, UNBRO assisted civilians only. This meant that UNBRO expected the camps to be free of military influence of any kind, and that no military activity was to take place in or through UNBRO camps at any time.

The fifth principle concerned UNBRO's equal commitment to upholding operational efficiency as well as humanitarian principles.

=== Services ===
In its first few years of operation UNBRO was essentially a logistics organization but, over time, it took on other activities as well:

- Distribution of basic humanitarian relief supplies: Documented residents of the camps received a daily water ration and a weekly food and firewood ration. Mosquito nets, mats, blankets, buckets, and basic cooking utensils were provided upon registration with the camp administration, in addition to a limited amount of bamboo, thatch, wire, and nails with which to build a small house;
- Maintenance of a central border pharmacy
- Primary level education
- Information on human rights, landmines awareness and repatriation information
- Assistance to affected Thai villages
- Material support for Cambodian-run social service facilities for needy families and for community-based programs such as adult literacy, early childhood development, Buddhist education and youth activities and sports

==== Protection and Security ====
The concept of protection was central to UNBRO's purpose in Thailand, as it was the victimization by war of Cambodian civilians that motivated the establishment of the border relief operation in the first place. While acknowledging that "physical safety is impossible to ensure and constantly at risk" in the border camps, UNBRO nevertheless outlined a broad definition of protection as a goal toward which all its activities would be oriented. This included protection from persecution by any military source, physical or political coercion, criminal victimization, extortion and/or the threat of violent revenge, as well as protection from the negative effects of severe overcrowding, unemployment, limited educational opportunities, etc.

UNBRO oversaw the internal security of the camps, although theft and violence plagued camps that were not under the control of the Khmer Rouge. UNBRO coordinated the different organizations providing protection on the border: ICRC was specifically concerned with war crimes, political crimes, and human rights violations, and the Khmer Police took care of traditional police functions within the camps. Between 1980 and 1987 security in the camps was the responsibility of a special Thai Rangers unit known as Task Force 80, however this unit violated human rights so extensively that it was disbanded and replaced by the DPPU (the Displaced Persons Protection Unit, a specially trained paramilitary unit created in 1987 expressly to provide security for the border camps). It was responsible for protecting camp boundaries and preventing bandits from entering the camps.

UNBRO also maintained a small team of Protection Officers, whose job it was to monitor the human rights situation in the camps, follow up cases in which people were victimized either deliberately or through poverty, neglect, or "system failure", and encourage people to come to them when they felt their human rights had been abused. UNBRO assumed responsibility for field communications and security coordination for UN and voluntary agency personnel officially working at the border (i.e. working on programs under agreement with UNBRO).

==== Food distribution and health care ====
UNBRO took charge of food distribution to refugees along the border, where previously there had been widespread diversion of supplies to the Thai military and to Khmer resistance units. By the late 1980s UNBRO had standardized its basic weekly food ration so as to provide adequate daily caloric intake established by the World Health Organization. On a per person basis rice, canned or dried fish, one egg and a vegetable were distributed weekly; dried beans, oil, salt, and wheat flour were given once a month. Exact amounts for the weekly and monthly rations in 1990 were as follows:

- Rice: 3.4 kilograms/week
- Eggs: 100 grams/week
- Vegetables: 500 grams/week
- Fish products: 210 grams/week
- Dry beans: 500 grams/month
- Oil: 700 grams/month
- Salt: 280 grams/month
- Wheat flour: 700 grams/month

This ration was designed to meet a minimum daily average of 2457 calories per person, the emergency caloric requirement set by the UN according to a 1985 WHO report on protein and energy requirements. When the direct distribution system was initiated in 1987, the energy supplied by a basic UNBRO ration was 2237 calories per person per day. In 1991 budgetary constraints forced UNBRO to reduce this basic ration to 2027 calories per person per day. Food distributions included 120 grams a month of soap.

UNBRO also supervised the provision of water in the border camps, few of which had access to natural sources of potable water. Each week trucks supplied by the Thai government transported 650,000 liters of chlorinated water to storage tanks in the camps. In addition, UNBRO supplied building materials to refugees and implemented an agricultural program to produce fresh vegetables in the camps.

UNBRO delegated responsibility for basic medical services, sanitation, public and environmental health programs, supplementary feeding and other services to numerous nongovernmental aid agencies operating on the border at that time.

==== Education ====
In 1988, with the agreement of the Royal Thai Government, UNBRO launched a major new educational assistance program, focusing at the primary level and providing support for curriculum development, the printing of educational materials, primary education, special education, adult literacy, and teacher training and the training of teacher trainers, the provision of supplies and the construction and equipment of classrooms. It also greatly expanded its support for social service programs targeting vulnerable and neglected groups and initiated new programs aimed at the development of life skills that would be useful in Cambodia upon repatriation. In all of these programs it strove to exclude political content and ensure that services would be provided equitably to all camp residents regardless of their political orientation. It promoted an ethic of egalitarianism and a system of reward based on merit.

=== Beneficiaries ===
As of January 1982, UNBRO provided services to 290,000 beneficiaries in three groups:

• 155,000 Cambodians in nine camps in the border's Central sector stretching from Ban Sangae to Tap Prik. In five camps in the Central (or Northwestern) sector (Ban Sangae, Kok Tahan, Phnom Chat, Nong Samet and Nong Chan) UNBRO was permitted to carry out frequent headcounts and direct distribution of food. UNBRO also distributed food in two of the Khmer Rouge camps to the south of Aranyaprathet (Nong Prue and Tap Prik) although initially it was not permitted to carry out headcounts. The Central sector also included NW82, a subcamp located at Nong Samet housing 800 Vietnamese land refugees assisted by ICRC.

• 70,000 Cambodians in the Northern and Southern sectors. The eight camps in the Northern sector (Ban Baranae, O'Bok, Naeng Mut, Chong Chom, Ban Charat, Samrong Kiat, Paet Urn and Nam Yuen) totalled 28,000 people. The three Southern sector camps comprising 42,000 aid recipients were Sok Sann, Borai and Ta Luan.

• 65,000 Thai border residents living in villages affected by conflict also received UNBRO food aid through the Affected Thai Village Program.

Following the 1984-1985 Vietnamese dry-season offensive the number of refugee camps administered by UNBRO was reduced from 21 to 11 as the refugee population was consolidated into larger camps such as Site Two.

=== Administration ===
The organization was initially run with WFP; in 1988 UNDP took over the administration of UNBRO from WFP. In 1991 the UN Secretary General decided that UNHCR would replace UNDP as the administrative agency. The UNHCR Representative in Thailand had the title of Director of UNBRO, but the UNBRO Deputy Director, whose sole responsibility was UNBRO, administered the day-to-day operations. UNBRO was phased out in December 2001.

== Legacy ==
UNBRO staff provided humanitarian aid under difficult and dangerous conditions in what was frequently an active war zone. In early 1983, Director Winston Prattley described the situation for donors in New York:

"The Khmer civilian administration and leadership...has rapidly given way to military or paramilitary leadership, whose visible and active presence has transformed most major settlements into armed camps. Weapons and military equipment are in plain evidence and are brandished amongst the UNBRO and voluntary agency personnel as they attempt to provide relief assistance. As a consequence, the control and direction of food distribution and provision of medical services has become less efficient, more precarious and often dangerous. UNBRO officials have been abused and held at gun-point. During the offensive, UNBRO and voluntary agency personnel have been subject to grave personal risk as a consequence of artillery bombardment and other military action..."

Critics concluded that UNBRO served a purpose beyond humanitarianism—namely as a vehicle to deliver support to anti-Vietnamese factions operating out of the refugee camps located in UNBRO's area of operations, thereby complicating Vietnam's efforts to play a decisive role in Cambodia's internal politics. UNBRO was also extensively criticized for failing to provide adequate protection for refugee camp residents from theft and violence.

Most United Nations member states and nongovernmental agencies still consider UNBRO to have been a model UN operation that efficiently and cost-effectively provided essential support to more than 350,000 Cambodian civilians and played a major role in saving the lives of thousands living under the harsh control of the Khmer Rouge or who were subject to shelling by Vietnamese forces.

Between 1994 and 2001, UNBRO sent 252 cartons of records to the off-site storage center used by UN organizations in Bangkok. On three occasions, in 1998, 1999, and 2001, the Deputy Director of UNBRO authorized the destruction of these records.
