= Khmer People's National Liberation Armed Forces =

Military component of the KPNLF

- កងកម្លាំងប្រដាប់អាវុធរំដោះជាតិខ្មែរ
- Leader: Son Sann (Prime Minister of CGDK)
- Founded: c.1978
- Dates active: 1978 - 1991
- Dissolved: 1991
- Country: Cambodia
- Allegiance: Democratic Kampuchea (Coalition Government) (1978 - 1990); National Government of Cambodia (1990 - 1991)
- Ideology: Anti-communism
- Political position: Right-wing
- Part of: Khmer People's National Liberation Front (KPNLF)

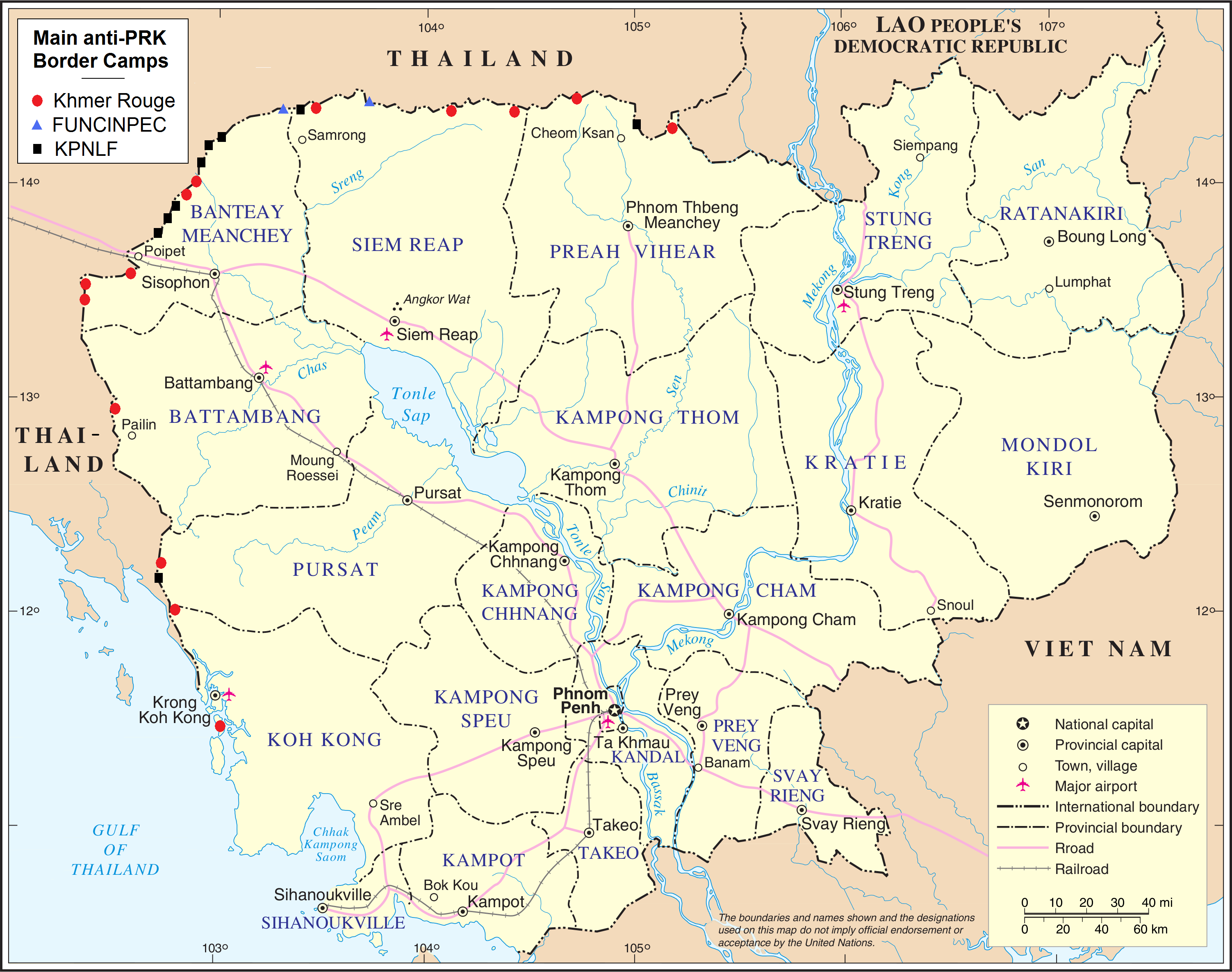
Border camps hostile to the PRK; 1979-1984. KPNLF camps shown in black.

The Khmer People's National Liberation Armed Forces (KPNLAF, Khmer: កងកម្លាំងប្រដាប់អាវុធរំដោះជាតិខ្មែរ) was the military component of the Khmer People's National Liberation Front (KPNLF) a political front organized in 1979 in opposition to the Vietnamese-installed People's Republic of Kampuchea (PRK) regime in Cambodia. The KPNLAF was loyal to Son Sann, a former Prime Minister under Prince Norodom Sihanouk and the founder of the KPNLF political movement.

== Establishment ==
The KPNLAF was formed in March 1979 from various anti-communist groups that had concentrated on the Thai-Cambodian border and which were opposed to the People's Republic of Kampuchea, the Vietnamese-backed government of Cambodia. Many of these groups were warlord bands, engaging more in smuggling and in internecine fighting than in combat operations. They were brought together by General Dien Del, a former career officer of the Khmer Republic who became chief of the KPNLAF General Staff. By mid-1979 there were 1,600 armed soldiers in the KPNLAF.

The KPNLF was proclaimed on October 9, 1979 at Sok Sann, a camp in the jungles of the Cardamom Mountains that contained barely 2,000 men and was a merger of 13 armed groups, some of them remnants of the Khmer National Armed Forces. The following month the first shipment of 3,000 rifles arrived from Beijing. In 1981 overall command was given to General Sak Sutsakhan, another prominent member of the Republic's former army.

== Expansion (1981–82) ==
General Dien Del opened an officer's training school at Ampil Refugee Camp (Ban Sangae) in January 1981. The first graduating class of 82 cadet officers, 68 company-level commanders and 76 platoon-level commanders immediately took up posts in the field. This was further helped by the arrival of some 3000 Chinese weapons in March.

Because of Son Sann's non-communist credentials, the KPNLAF offered an alternative to those Cambodians who supported neither Sihanouk, Hanoi nor the Khmer Rouge, and it quickly became the second largest guerrilla force in Thailand, second only to the remnants of the Khmer Rouge. By mid-1981, with about 7,000 personnel under arms, it was able to protect its refugee camps and occasionally to conduct forays into Cambodia.

In June 1982 the KPNLF joined the Coalition Government of Democratic Kampuchea, although military operations between the three partner organizations never achieved any degree of coordination.

Nong Chan Refugee Camp became the KPNLAF's military headquarters at the end of 1982, although Ampil Camp remained the administrative headquarters until it was destroyed in early 1985. Nong Chan housed the KPNLAF's 3rd, 7th and 9th battalions and a Special Forces commando unit, while the 1st Battalion was at Nong Samet Refugee Camp and the 2nd at Ampil. By early 1984 Son Sann claimed that his KPNLF army "…had 12,000 fully armed fighters, with an additional 8,000 trained but still without weapons."

== Equipment ==
The KPNLAF favored strike-and-retreat guerrilla tactics and tended to operate in small, lightly armed, highly mobile units of 6 to 12 soldiers.

- The Chinese-made Type 56 assault rifle was the weapon of choice, supplied by the People's Republic of China or captured in combat but also occasionally bought or traded from KPRAF troops. The folding stock version came into common use in the early 1980s.
- M79 grenade launchers and the B-40 variant of the RPG-2 were used both in attack and in the defense of the border camps.
- Soviet-made 82mm B-10 recoilless rifles were the KPNLAF's only form of artillery and were used primarily in defensive positions.
- A small number of mortars was supplied by China during 1985.

Due to the lack of weapons, many KPNLAF troops carried their own guns, including American M16s which had been supplied by the US military to Khmer National Armed Forces troops prior to 1975. A few soldiers even carried hunting rifles or shotguns.

KPNLAF forces were adept at the use of landmines, particularly blast mines such as the PMN-2 and M14, as well as bounding fragmentation mines such as the M16A2 and the M2A4.

== Vietnamese offensive (1984–85) ==
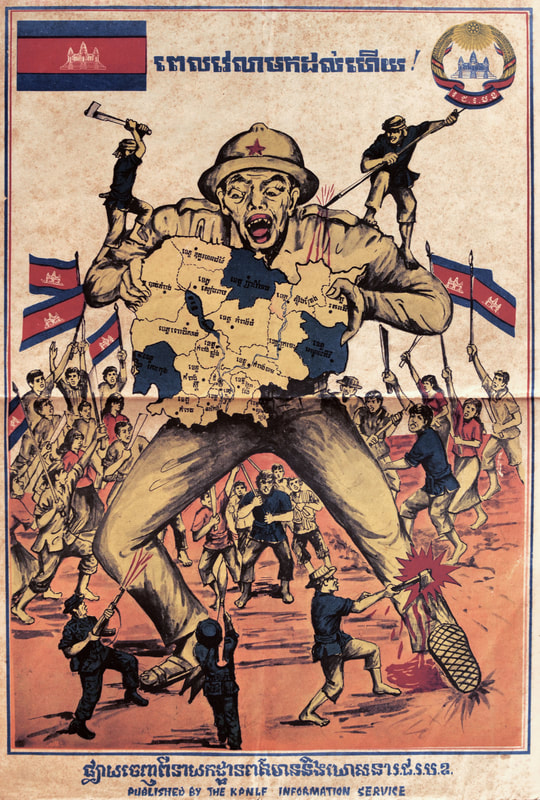
KPNLF’s anti-Vietnam propaganda

Two developments in the mid-1980s greatly diminished KPNLAF capabilities as a fighting force. The first of these was the Vietnamese dry season offensive of November 1984 to March 1985, which weakened the KPNLAF's numbers and forced them to abandon several fortified border encampments (such as Nong Samet and Nong Chan) on the Thai-Cambodian border. The other insurgent forces, the Khmer Rouge and the Armée Nationale Sihanoukiste, were also affected by this offensive, which reduced the number of camps on the border from 21 to 11. The Government of Thailand and the international community viewed the quartering of KPNLAF troops in civilian camps as a recipe for disaster, and United Nations Border Relief Operation, the UN agency responsible for security on the border, relocated the camps inside Thailand with troops in separate camps from refugees.

The second development, equally harmful to the KPNLAF cause, was the dispute that broke out among the top leaders. Following the loss of the border camps, contemporary reports noted that "open revolt" had broken out among guerrilla commanders over the "dictatorial ways" of Son Sann, who had continued as president of the KPNLF, and his "interference in military matters." The crisis resulted in the virtual paralysis of the KPNLAF until leadership issues were resolved in late 1986.

== Commando operations inside Cambodia ==
Partly as a result of leadership disputes that prevented the development of a coordinated military strategy, the KPNLAF turned to sabotage and demolition in order to wage a war of attrition. Starting in 1983 the Special Air Service of the United Kingdom secretly provided training to a 250-man KPNLAF commando battalion. Commandos were trained to operate independently in enemy territory in six-man units that attacked bridges, railways, trains, office buildings, artillery, power lines, transformers, and radar stations, using small group tactics, booby-traps, landmines and improvised explosive devices manufactured from commercial products or conventional ordnance. Students were also trained in tactics, weapons, navigation, first aid, radio communications, and unarmed combat. At least six training courses of six to ten weeks were conducted between 1986 and 1989. The training was provided in Thailand at a Thai military facility near the Burmese border, and in Singapore. Revelation by John Pilger of these activities caused considerable debate in the House of Commons of the United Kingdom in July 1991.

== Demobilization ==
Hostilities involving KPNLAF forces had largely ended by mid-1989, and Vietnam withdrew the bulk of its occupying troops from Cambodia by September 21, 1989. General Dien Del presided over the demobilization of the KPNLAF in February 1992.
