= Sa Kaeo Refugee Camp =

Refugee camp on the Thai-Cambodian border, 1979-1980

Sa Kaeo Ban Kaeng
- Refugee camp
- Location in Thailand
- Coordinates: 13°49′14″N 102°03′32″E
- Country: Thailand
- Established by the Government of Thailand, UNHCR: October 1979
- Relocated by UNHCR and the Royal Thai Government: November 1979-July 1980

Government
  - Type: UNHCR, Khmer Rouge

Area
  - Total: 0.16 km^{2} (0.062 sq mi)

Population (November 1979)
  - Total: 30,000
  - Density: 480/km^{2} (1,200/sq mi)

Sa Kaeo Refugee Camp (Thai: ค่ายผู้อพยพสระแก้ว, romanized: Khaiphuopphayop Sara Kaeo), also referred to as Sa Kaeo I or Ban Kaeng) was the first organized refugee relief camp established on the Thai-Cambodian border. It was built by the Royal Thai Government with support from international relief agencies including the United Nations. It opened in October 1979 and closed in early-July 1980. At its peak the population exceeded 30,000 refugees; no formal census was ever conducted.

== Origins of the Cambodian refugee crisis ==
Vietnam invaded Democratic Kampuchea in December 1978 and by early-1979 thousands of Cambodians had crossed the Thai-Cambodian border seeking safety and food. By May 1979 large numbers of refugees had set up improvised camps at Kampot, Mairut, Lumpuk, Khao Larn, and Ban Thai Samart, near Aranyaprathet. In June, 42,000 Khmer refugees were pushed back into Cambodia by the Thai Royal Army in what was known as the Dangrek genocide, which sparked international outrage and was discussed in July 1979 during an international conference on the Indochinese refugee crisis in Geneva. Then on 10 October, 60,000 Khmer Rouge soldiers and civilians under their control arrived at Khlong Wa and, shortly thereafter, Khlong Gai Thuen. These refugees were in advanced stages of exhaustion and malnutrition, and the need for organized living arrangements was obvious.

== Establishment of Sa Kaeo Refugee Camp ==
On 22 October 1979 Colonel Sanan Kajornklam of the Thai Supreme Command telephoned Martin Barber of UNHCR to inform him that the Thai military would transport Cambodians at the border from areas south of Aranyaprathet to a location outside of the Thai town of Sa Kaeo, about 40 miles inside the border. UNHCR was invited to establish a holding center there that would house up to 90,000 refugees. UNHCR sent one of its newest recruits, British journalist Mark Malloch Brown, together with his Thai assistant, Kadisis Rochanakorn, to survey the site, a 160,000-square-meter uninhabited area used for rice cultivation. The Thai government requested that UNHCR make immediate emergency preparations for the Cambodians. Brown hired a bulldozer and started carving roads in the mud. A backhoe was hired to dig latrines. Water tanks were donated by Christian and Missionary Alliance (CAMA), which also donated 100,000 pieces of bamboo and thatch to construct a hospital, built hastily by 200 Thai workers Brown hired at US$2 a day. A crude warehouse was built. Catholic Relief Services donated plastic rope, straw mats, and baby bottles. With less than one day's advance notice, UNHCR and other volunteer agencies hastily constructed basic camp infrastructure as thousands of malnourished Cambodians arrived. Several hundred unaccompanied children were in these first groups of refugees.

On 24 October 8,000 refugees arrived by bus from settlements at the border. According to Dr. Hans Nothdurft: "Initially, the camp was no more than a fenced-off area of bushland with no housing facilities, no water, and no sewage system; approximately 2.7 square meters of space were available for each person. Part of the area was designated for the camp hospital; a bulldozer-cleared field with some bamboo-canvas construction provided primitive shelter for approximately 300 patients.

When the first refugees arrived, there were only three doctors and eight other health workers present. The health status of the first refugees in Sa Kaeo was dire; for several months many of them had been starving in the mountains sandwiched between the Vietnamese to the east and the closed Thai border to the west. Nearly 2,000 severely ill or dying refugees were brought to the hospital area in the first few days. The medical personnel were assisted by volunteers from Bangkok organized by the wife of the US ambassador. As the refugees arrived, nurses sent those who appeared to be sick or starving to a makeshift hospital which Dr. Levi Roque constructed by stringing a wire from a bulldozer to a tent pole and draping it with canvas. There were no beds; refugees lay on straw mats.

Khmer Rouge soldiers were mixed in with the women and children. A reporter said, "They did not look like human beings...but rather like wild animals...They slept huddled side by side like beasts in a cage." Doctors wrote instructions for care on the chests of patients with marking pens of different colors for different treatments. The US embassy volunteers were pressed into giving injections and other duties normally performed only by trained medical personnel. Reporters were persuaded to carry buckets of electrolyte fluid from patient to patient and try to get them to drink cupfuls of the liquid. In the midst of the chaos, monsoons struck and many refugees died on the cold, wet ground without being able to get to the hospital. During the camp's first 14 days of operation between 14 and 42 people died each day, according to Dr. Keith Dahlberg.

Within eight days the camp's population grew to over 30,000 people. After 8 November mortality dropped to a daily average of three or four, over half of whom died outside the hospital.

There was no naturally occurring source of potable water. The Thai military trucked water in from Aranyaprathet. Drainage in the campsite was such that shortly after the refugees arrived, it flooded and a few refugees, too weak to lift their heads, drowned as they lay under tents made of plastic sheets.

== Camp services ==
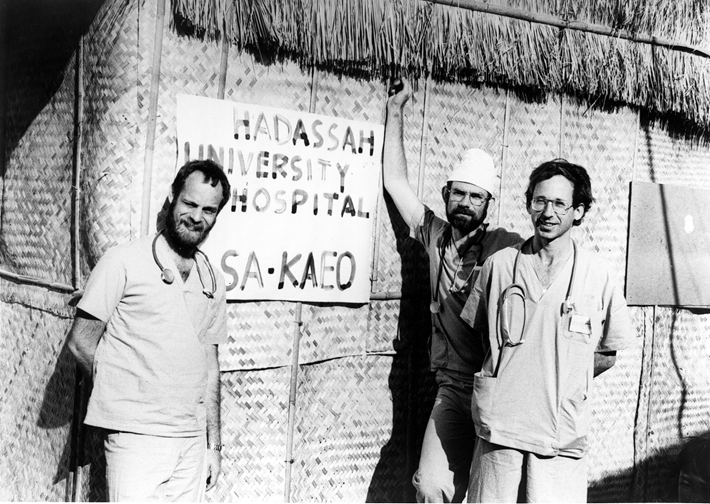
Israeli doctors from the Hadassah Medical Center outside the Sa Kaeo Hospital in 1979.

By the end of November 1979 some 15 Thai and international relief agencies were providing services at Sa Kaeo, including the Thai Red Cross, ICRC, MSF, Christian and Missionary Alliance, World Vision, and an Israeli medical team. Catholic and Buddhist institutions provided additional volunteers as did several embassies. Numerous individuals also volunteered their services.

The medical personnel at Sa Kaeo (up to 60 doctors and 170 other health workers by early-1980) represented different nationalities with different languages, cultural values, and medical training, but only a few team members had ever worked in a developing country or had seen malaria and severe malnutrition before—the two prevailing problems in the camp. Their repeated calls for x-ray facilities, for more laboratory support, and their preference for expensive drug regimens reflected medical cultural values of developed countries.

Water was initially carried by truck to the camp and stored in aluminum drums. Three deep wells drilled during the second week of operation were eventually connected via a network of pipes to distribute water throughout the camp. A trench latrine was dug around the periphery of the camp. Thai provincial health authorities provided insect control by draining stagnant water and spraying insecticides.

A 1,200-bed hospital was initially no more than a thatched roof without walls, where patients lay on mats on the dirt floor with medical records and intravenous solutions clipped to wires above them. Within a week, however, the teams had improvised a blood bank, delivery room, receiving ward, and a special nutrition center.

=== Physical condition of the refugees ===
Mass starvation dominated the medical picture. Marasmus, kwashiorkor, beriberi, and anemia were widespread, with many patients showing all four. Vitamin deficiencies, particularly of vitamin A and vitamin B_{1} were common. Hookworm and ascaris infections aggravated malnutrition and anemia, especially in children. Dysentery, both bacillary and amebic, also complicated many patients' nutritional status. Lice and scabies were endemic.

Most refugees were infected with malaria, and 55 percent of cases were diagnosed as falciparum, much of it chloroquine–resistant. Numerous cases of cerebral malaria and blackwater fever were encountered, and a few cases of hemorrhagic fever due to dengue.

== Composition of the camp population ==
Rosalynn Carter, at Sa Kaeo, holds a child in her arms while speaking with the mother, 9 November 1979.

A large proportion of the Cambodians in Sa Kaeo were Khmer Rouge soldiers and the civilians they had forced to flee with them to the border. This was because the Khmer Rouge were eager to move some of their cadre to the sanctuary inside Thailand where they could receive food and medical attention, rest and recuperate, and regain their strength in order to fight the Vietnamese. It was also Thai policy to maintain separate camps for populations under Khmer Rouge control, since providing aid to them was politically controversial and because the Thai government considered the Khmer Rouge the only force capable of mounting any meaningful resistance to the Vietnamese. The Khmer Rouge quickly replicated their power structures in Sa Kaeo and their cadre exerted almost complete control over camp residents.

== Visit by First Lady Rosalynn Carter ==
In an effort to show US support for the Thai response, First Lady Rosalynn Carter visited Thailand with Richard Holbrooke, several members of congress and a group of journalists to tour the camp on 9 November 1979. Her visit was widely publicized and appeared on the nightly news on all major US networks. In one frequently-aired clip, a refugee died in front of Carter while an American physician protested irritably: "'This girl is about to go,' said an angry doctor, ordering the newsmen covering the visit to keep back. 'She just had a blood transfusion, but she's not going to make it.'" Later the First Lady recalled: "I picked up a baby and put it down on a blanket on the ground. They started crying, and when I turned around the baby had died." The First Lady later told reporters, "I'm emotionally overwhelmed. It's a very difficult situation for me as a wife and a mother to visit the camp and see such poverty and misery. I'm going home as fast as I can to tell my husband about it."

== Camp closing ==
Embarrassed by the unfavorable impression created by Sa Kaeo, the Thai government asked Mark Malloch Brown of the UNHCR to prepare a new site with better drainage and more space. In late-November 1979 Khao-I-Dang Holding Center was opened. The Thai Government immediately began transferring refugees from Sa Kaeo to Khao-I-Dang. Since most of the refugees were under the control of the Khmer Rouge, the Thai government encouraged them to return to areas of northwestern Cambodia under Khmer Rouge control. This was viewed as a gross violation of human rights by many aid workers, including the Preah Maha Ghosananda and the Reverend Peter L. Pond, who staged a protest at the camp's Buddhist temple in June 1980 and were imprisoned by the Thai military. Another camp, Sa Kaeo II, was opened and by July 1980 all refugees had been transferred to other camps or forcibly repatriated, over 7,500 of them to Khmer Rouge-controlled areas inside Cambodia

== Impact of Sa Kaeo ==
Images of dead and dying refugees at Sa Kaeo were broadcast around the world and international aid began to flow into Thailand to assist the refugees. This also engendered the belief that famine was general in Cambodia. A front-page article in The New York Times said, "2.25 Million Cambodians Are Said to Face Starvation." The international community responded with large amounts of food aid that was delivered to Cambodians by the "land bridge" at Nong Chan Refugee Camp.

== See also ==
- Cambodian humanitarian crisis
- Indochina refugee crisis
- Nong Chan Refugee Camp
- Nong Samet Refugee Camp
- Site Two Refugee Camp
- Khao-I-Dang
