= Japan International Volunteer Center =

Japan International Volunteer Centeris an international non-governmental organization providing assistance in community development, peace exchange and emergency relief in 10 countries/regions of Asia and Africa. Established in 1980 and based in Tokyo, Japan.

The Center works in Cambodia, Laos, Thailand, South Africa, Iraq, Palestine, Afghanistan, Korea, Sudan and South Sudan. Its projects are supported in the spheres of agriculture, water provision, forest preservation/utilization, children's education, peace building, emergency relief.

Japan International Volunteer Center also initiated or participates in some networking campaigns, including:

- Japan NGO Center for International Cooperation (JANIC)
- Agency Coordinating Body for Afghan Relief and Development (ACBAR)
- Association of International Development Agencies (AIDA)
- Japan Campaign to Ban Landmines (JCBL),
- People's Forum on Cambodia, Japan.
