= Alight =

International nonprofit organization

- ARC Logo
- Established: 1978; 48 years ago
- Type: Non-governmental
- Legal status: Non-profit
- Headquarters: Minneapolis, Minnesota, US
- Region served: Worldwide
- Fields: Humanitarian aid
- Revenue: $82,6 million (2025)
- Expenses: $89.3 million (2025)
- Website: wearealight.org
- Formerly called: American Refugee Committee

Alight, formerly the American Refugee Committee (ARC), is an international nonprofit, nonsectarian organization that provides humanitarian assistance and training to refugees.

Alight works with its partners and constituencies to provide opportunities and expertise to communities of refugees and internally displaced persons in seven countries in Africa, Asia, and Europe, including Iraq, Kosovo, Haiti and in the Darfur region of Sudan. Alight provides shelter, clean water and sanitation, health care, skills training, microcredit education, and protection to help survivors of war and natural disasters to rebuild their lives and promote human dignity, health care, security, and self-sufficiency.

== History and leadership ==
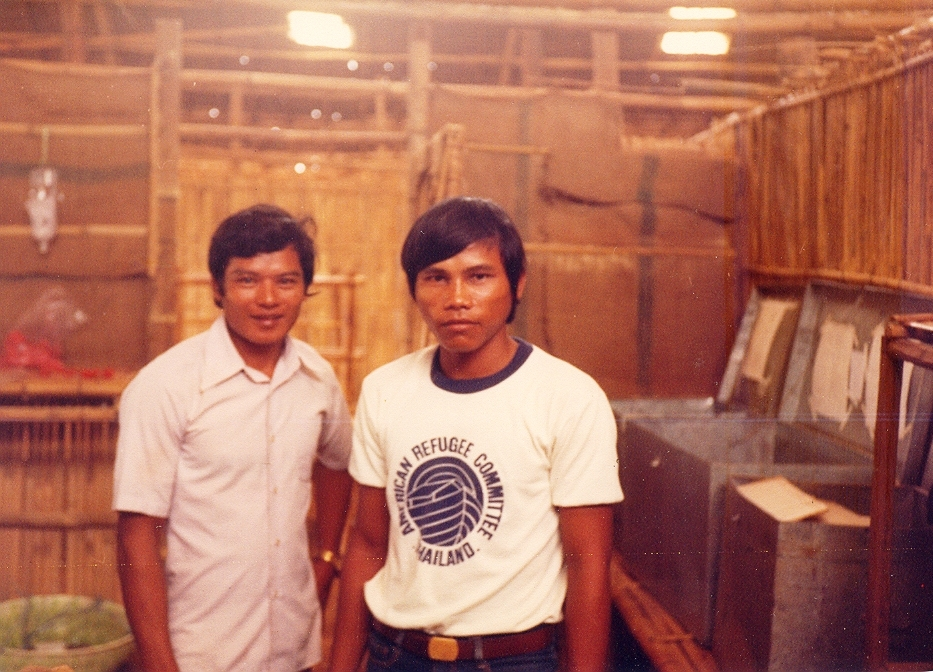
Cambodian medics trained by Alight at Nong Samet Refugee Camp, May 1984

The American Refugee Committee (ARC), later renamed Alight, was founded in 1978 by Chicago businessman Neal Ball after he became involved in resettling refugees displaced by conflicts in Southeast Asia. One of ARC's first programs opened at Khao-I-Dang refugee camp in Thailand in late 1979. ARC also provided medical and public health services at Nong Samet Refugee Camp, Phanat Nikhom, Ban Vinai Refugee Camp and Site Two Refugee Camp until 1993, when the camps closed and ARC turned its attention to programs inside Cambodia. ARC later provided health, sanitation and laboratory services at Khao Phlu Refugee Camp from 1997 until 1999.

ARC was incorporated in Illinois in December 1978, and in 1979 the organization established its headquarters in Minneapolis, Minnesota, where Stan Breen became its first executive director. Its early work included refugee resettlement in the United States and humanitarian assistance in refugee camps in Thailand.

Over the following decades, ARC expanded into an international humanitarian organization, establishing programs across Africa, Asia, Europe, the Middle East and the Americas in response to conflict, forced displacement and natural disasters.

Anthony J. Kozlowski served as ARC's executive director and later as president and chief executive officer during the organization's international expansion in the 1990s and early 2000s. Hugh Q. Parmer, a former assistant administrator for humanitarian response at the U.S. Agency for International Development, was appointed president of ARC in 2002. He was succeeded by Karen Frederickson, who had previously served as ARC's executive vice president and was serving as president by 2009.

Daniel Wordsworth joined ARC as president and CEO in 2009, after twelve years with the Christian Children's Fund. During his tenure, the organization expanded its international programs and incorporated human-centered design and community participation into its humanitarian work, including a feedback system called Kuja Kuja and a collaboration with the design nonprofit IDEO.org.

In June 2019, the American Refugee Committee changed its name to Alight, following a rebranding process that included input from staff, board members and displaced communities.

Jocelyn Wyatt, co-founder and former CEO of IDEO.org, was appointed CEO of Alight in 2021, succeeding Wordsworth.

== Program areas ==
Alight's programs are organized around several areas, including health, water and sanitation, camp management, emergency response, education, protection, and social enterprise. According to Sustainable Brands, Alight has said it reaches approximately four million displaced people annually across these program areas.

Alight incorporates co-creation in its programs, involving displaced people and host communities in the design and adaptation of services. This approach draws on human-centered design principles and emphasizes direct participation by community members in shaping program activities.

=== Health and nutrition ===
Alight provides primary and reproductive health care, maternal health services, disease prevention and nutrition support in communities affected by displacement.

=== Water, sanitation and hygiene ===
Alight's water, sanitation and hygiene (WASH) programs focus on access to clean water, sanitation infrastructure and hygiene.

=== Shelter, camp management and emergency response ===
Alight provides emergency and transitional shelter, manages camp services, and responds to conflicts, natural disasters and displacement emergencies.

=== Protection ===
Alight's protection programs are intended to prevent and respond to violence and to support people at heightened risk, including women and children, through psychosocial support, counseling and referrals.

=== Education ===
Alight supports formal and non-formal education for children and young people, as well as vocational and skills-based learning.

=== Livelihoods and social enterprise ===
Alight supports vocational training, entrepreneurship and other livelihoods initiatives intended to expand economic opportunities for displaced people and host communities.

== Geographic presence and major responses ==
Since its founding in 1978, Alight — formerly the American Refugee Committee — has worked with displaced and conflict-affected communities across Africa, Asia, Europe, the Middle East and the Americas, with its footprint changing over time as individual country programs have opened and closed.

=== Asia ===
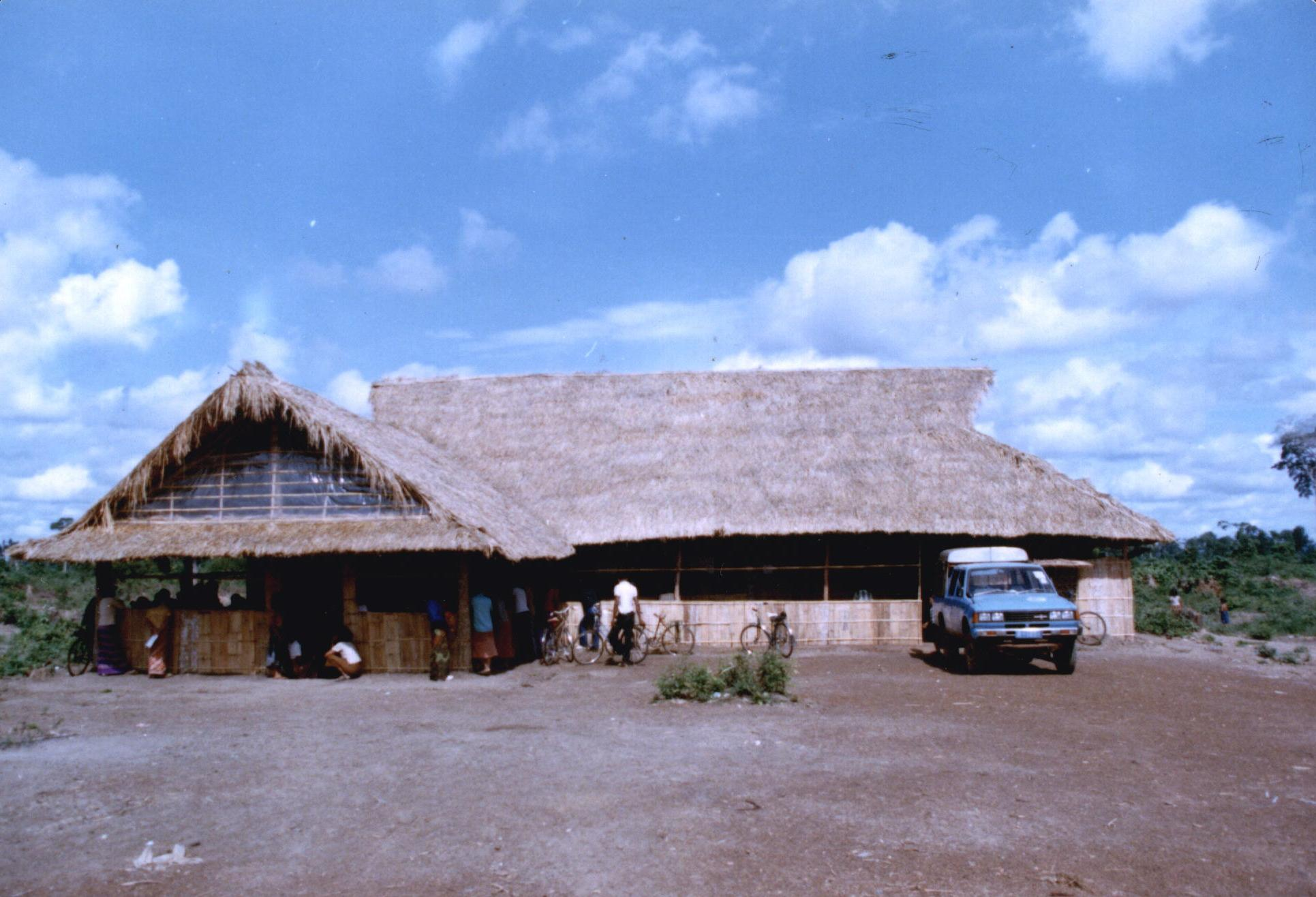
Alight's Outpatient Dept. 1, Nong Samet Refugee Camp, May 1984

Alight (formerly ARC) first international programs were established in Southeast Asia in 1979 in response to displacement following the conflicts in Cambodia and Laos, initially providing medical and other humanitarian services in refugee camps in Thailand before expanding into Cambodia.

Alight (formerly ARC) subsequently developed programs and emergency responses elsewhere in Asia, including in Pakistan, Myanmar, the Philippines and Sri Lanka; Pakistan became one of the organization's longer-running country programs, spanning education, health and nutrition, and emergency response.

Myanmar was a significant Alight country program. However, following cuts to U.S. foreign assistance in 2025, Alight's CEO Jocelyn Wyatt said the organization lost its U.S. government funding for its Myanmar program.

=== Africa ===
Alight staff member conducting malnutrition scanning in Tarsin Village, Sudan.

Africa became one Alight's principal region of operation; over several decades the organization has worked in countries including Rwanda, Uganda, Sudan, South Sudan, Somalia, Ethiopia, Kenya, the Democratic Republic of the Congo, Liberia, Sierra Leone, Guinea and Malawi.

Alight (formerly ARC) established operations in Rwanda and Uganda during the 1990s, and began responding to the conflict in Darfur, Sudan, in 2004. Alight has continued operating in Sudan during the conflict that began in 2023, including a food-assistance program launched in North Darfur in late 2025 in response to escalating violence.

In September 2024, Alight opened a regional hub in Nairobi, describing it as a co-creation space bringing together displaced people, local organizations and partners.

=== Balkans ===
ARC expanded into the Balkans during the wars following the breakup of Yugoslavia, operating from 1992 across the successor states and territories of the former Yugoslavia (except Slovenia) as well as Albania. Programs included public and mental health services, legal assistance, reconstruction, reconciliation initiatives and support for refugees and internally displaced people.

=== Middle East ===
Alight (formerly ARC) has supported communities affected by conflict and displacement in the Middle East, including in Iraq, Syria and Jordan. In Jordan, Alight works through its affiliate Questscope, which provides education, mentoring, trauma recovery and livelihood programs for Syrian refugees and other communities.

=== Americas ===
Alight (formerly ARC) responded to the 2010 earthquake in Haiti with emergency health, shelter, water and sanitation services. Alight's more recent work in the Americas has included the United States, Mexico, Colombia and El Salvador. In the United States, Alight supports refugees and other newcomers through employment and community-integration services.

=== Europe ===
Alight guides assist arriving refugees near the Poland–Ukraine border, 2022.

Following Russia's full-scale invasion of Ukraine in 2022, Alight expanded its work in Europe, initially deploying an emergency response team to Poland. Its response has since included programs in Ukraine, Poland and Germany (through its affiliate ORAM) supporting displaced Ukrainians with housing, mental-health and psychosocial support, and other services.

=== Changing geographic footprint ===
Historical and current sources document Alight (formerly ARC) programs, emergency responses and partnerships across dozens of countries and territories, including Albania, Bosnia and Herzegovina, Cambodia, Colombia, Croatia, the Democratic Republic of the Congo, El Salvador, Ethiopia, Germany, Guinea, Haiti, Iraq, Jordan, Kenya, Kosovo, Kyrgyzstan, Liberia, Malawi, Mexico, Montenegro, Myanmar, North Macedonia, Pakistan, the Philippines, Poland, Rwanda, Serbia, Sierra Leone, Somalia, South Sudan, Sri Lanka, Sudan, Syria, Thailand, Uganda, Ukraine, and the United States. A number of these programs have since closed.

== Awards and distinctions ==
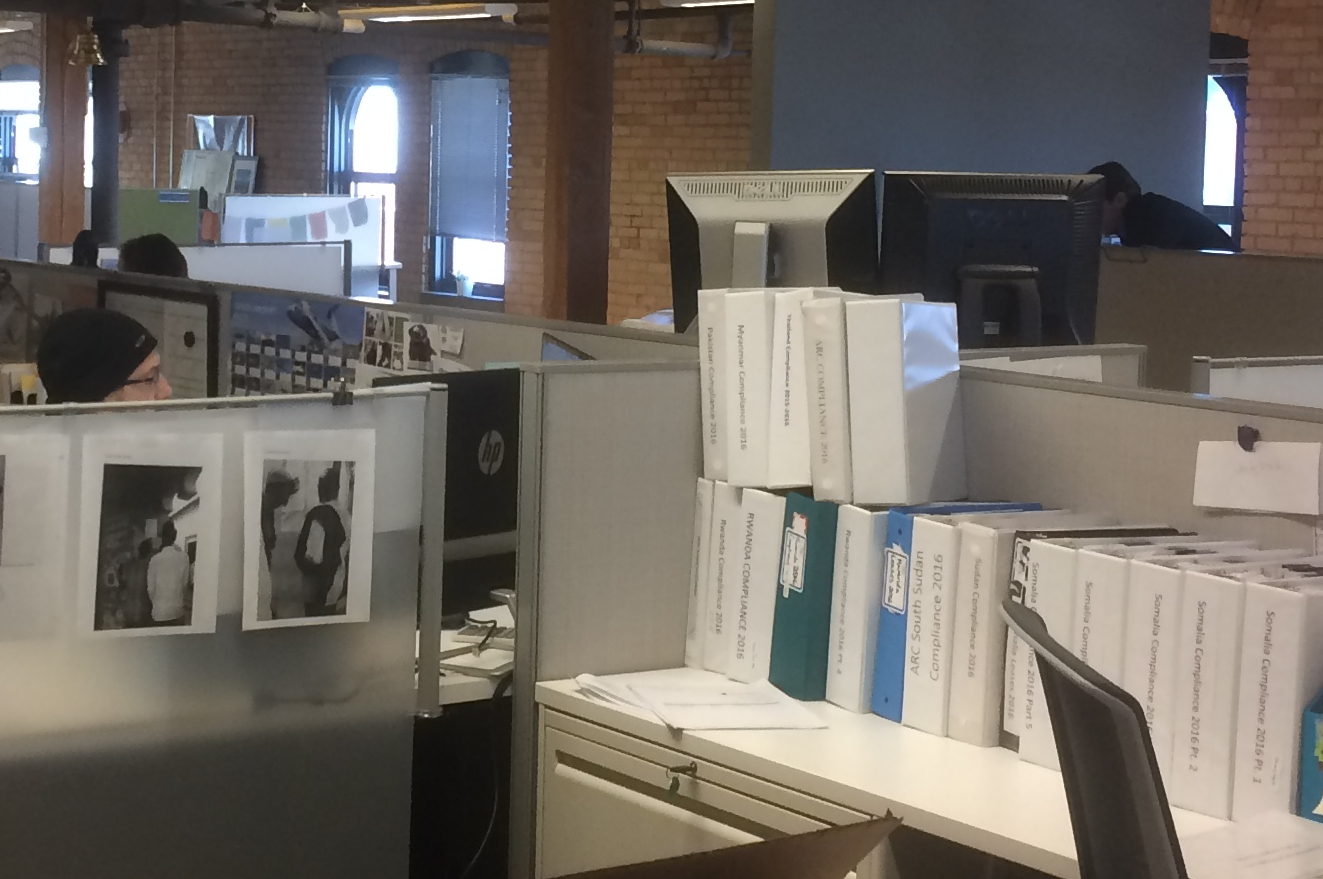
Compliance manuals in the Alight office in Minneapolis

Alight was given an A rating by CharityWatch, a charity watchdog created by the American Institute of Philanthropy to rate non-profit organizations based on the ratio of funds spent on humanitarian aid compared to administrative overhead.

== Records ==
Records of Alight (and the American Refugee Committee) are available for research use. They include domestic and international program records, organizational files, correspondence, subject files, publications, printed material, and newspaper clippings.
