= Cord (charity) =

UK-based charity

Cord is a peacebuilding charity working with people and communities affected by violent conflict in Africa and Asia. Established in 1967 and located in Leamington Spa, UK, Cord works by "carrying out practical work relieving poverty and promoting social cohesion to build peace, working with people and communities of all faiths or none".

Peacebuilding projects include water and sanitation, education, women's empowerment and capacity building.

The organisation currently works in Burundi, Cambodia, Chad, Laos and Myanmar combining its efforts with the support of individuals, schools, churches, trusts, companies, the British Government, the European Union and the United Nations.

Cord took an active part in gathering support for the victims of the Darfur conflict and are still working with over 250,000 Sudanese who are living in the refugee camps of Eastern Chad.

Cord's Ambassador is the BBC Midlands Today presenter, Sarah Falkland, now Sarah Bishop. The charity's patrons include Chris White (MP for Warwick and Leamington 2010–2017) and author Gillian Cross. Cord’s Chief Executive is Mark Simmons. Cord is a member of People In Aid, a global network of development and humanitarian assistance agencies which promote, support and recognise good practice in the management of aid personnel.
