= Dien Del =

Cambodian politician/general (1932–2013)

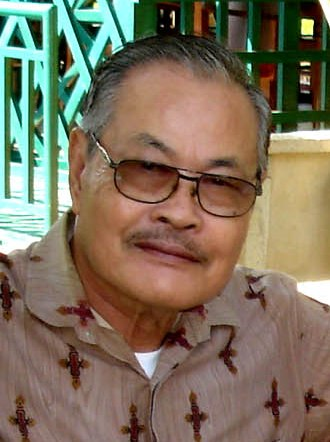
- Dien Del in Kien Svay, Cambodia, January 2008
- Born: 1932; Sóc Trăng, Cochinchina, French Indochina
- Died: 13 February 2013 (aged 81); Tuek Thla, Phnom Penh, Cambodia
- Education: Lycee Sisowath, Montpelier School of Military Administration
- Military career
- Allegiance: Cambodia
- Service years: 1951–2001
- Rank: Brigadier general
- Commands: 2nd FANK Division; Governor and Commander of Territorial Forces, Kandal Province; Chief of General Staff KPNLAF; Inspector General of the Royal Cambodian Armed Forces General Staff
- Conflicts: Cambodian Civil War; Operation Chenla II, 1971; Defense of Phnom Penh, 1975; Cambodian–Vietnamese War; Defense of Ampil Refugee Camp, 1985

General Dien Del (Khmer: ដៀន ដែល; 1932 – February 13, 2013) was a prominent Cambodian military officer and later, politician. He directed combat operations in Cambodia, first as a general in the Army of the Khmer Republic (1970–1975) and then as a leader of Khmer People's National Liberation Front (KPNLF) guerrilla forces fighting against the Vietnamese occupation (1979–1992). Following Vietnam's withdrawal from Cambodia in 1990, he presided over the demobilization of the KPNLF's armed forces in February 1992. In 1998 he was elected to the National Legislative Assembly as a member of FUNCINPEC. He spent the last fifteen years of his career as advisor to the Cambodian government.

== Early career ==
Dien Del was born to an ethnic Khmer Krom family in 1932 at Sóc Trăng. He attended the prestigious Lycée Sisowath in Phnom Penh from 1946 to 1952, then entered military service in the French colonial Cambodian Army. From 1953 to 1956 he was a company commander in the 6th Battalion at Kampong Speu. He came to Phnom Penh in 1957 and was a member of the Royal Khmer Armed Forces (FARK) Headquarters G-1 Office. He studied at the Royal Military Academy in 1957–58, and returned to headquarters as the deputy chief of G-1.

From 1959 to 1960 he attended a French military administration school at Montpellier, France. He returned to Cambodia in 1961 and assumed the post of Deputy Chief of Headquarters G-1. In 1962 he joined the Royal Armed Forces General Staff, and in 1964 he was promoted to major and became commander of the 24th Intervention Battalion.

== Cambodian Civil War (1970–1975) ==
In 1970 he was promoted to lieutenant colonel in the Khmer National Armed Forces (FANK) and assumed the command of the 2nd Brigade at Prey Sar near Phnom Penh. Also during this time he was involved in the evacuation of Cambodian forces from positions along National Route 19 to Vietnam with the help of American troops. In 1971 he was elevated to the rank of colonel in command of the 2nd Group, which consisted of the 2nd Brigade and two other brigades. His unit was involved in the disastrous Operation Chenla II, an attempt to clear National Route 6 in Kampong Thom Province in 1971. After this he was sent to study at the South Vietnamese High Command near Saigon. He returned to Cambodia in January 1972 and was promoted to the rank of brigadier general in command of the 2nd Division. Journalist Elizabeth Becker later described a visit to his headquarters on Highway 4 in January 1973 with cameraman Neil Davis, seeing the heads of Khmer Rouge soldiers on stakes along the road. Dien Del told her that beheading was practiced by both sides.

In May 1974 he was appointed Governor and Commander of Territorial Forces in Kandal Province. Throughout the early months of 1975 he supervised the defense of Phnom Penh, and Khmer Rouge Radio reported that on 20 February he was "severely injured" in combat at Dei Eth. In April he took charge of the defense of Monivong Bridge, the main entrance into Phnom Penh across the Bassac River. As Khmer Rouge forces entered the city on 17 April, he flew out on the last helicopter to Utapao Air Base in Thailand. He was held there in a refugee camp until May 1975, when he went to Alexandria, Virginia, with his wife and children.

== Role in the formation of the KPNLF (1977–1979) ==
In May 1977 he flew to Paris and helped to organize a political group in cooperation with non-communist resistance forces under former Prime Minister Son Sann. On 1 February 1979, Dien Del flew to Thailand to form the Khmer People's National Liberation Armed Forces (KPNLAF). Nguon Pythoureth followed and the two went from one refugee camp to another on the Thai-Cambodian border, persuading local leaders to join forces. By mid-1979 the KPNLAF consisted of about 1,600 soldiers. On 9 October 1979 this group became the Khmer People's National Liberation Front (KPNLF) under Son Sann, and General Dien Del was appointed Chief of the General Staff.

== Guerrilla resistance against the Vietnamese occupation of Cambodia ==
In January 1981 General Dien established an officer training program at Ban Sangae Refugee Camp. Shortly after this General Sak Sutsakhan arrived in Thailand from the United States. Minister of Defense under Sihanouk, he had been Head of State of the Khmer Republic during its final days and had a reputation for decisiveness and incorruptibility that lent legitimacy to the KPNLF.

=== Power struggle within the KPNLF (1985–1986) ===
In the 1984 to 1985 Vietnamese dry-season offensive, the KPNLF reportedly lost nearly a third of its 12,000 to 15,000 troops in battle and through desertions. This setback, which was blamed on Son Sann for his alleged meddling in military matters (particularly his unwillingness to cooperate with Sihanouk's forces), aggravated long-standing conflicts within the KPNLF. In December 1985 several KPNLF leaders announced the formation of a Provisional Central Committee of Salvation, which would be the new executive body of the KPNLF. Key members of the group included General Sak Sutsakhan, General Dien Del, Abdul Gaffar Peang Meth, Hing Kunthon and former Prime Minister Huy Kanthoul

Son Sann countered with the formation of a new military command committee under General Prum Vith. He said, however, that General Sak would remain as Commander-in-Chief of the Joint Military Command, which was launched in January 1986 reportedly as a concession to the dissident group. Under a compromise worked out through a third party, General Sak regained his control of the armed forces in March 1986. In July General Dien retired temporarily to a monastery.

After shedding his monk's robes in late 1986, General Dien continued as deputy commander-in-chief, directing combat operations against the Vietnamese until their withdrawal from Cambodia in 1990. General Dien presided over the demobilization of the KPNLF's armed forces in February 1992, after which he returned to Cambodia.

== Career in government ==
In 1994 he was appointed Inspector General of the Royal Cambodian Armed Forces General Staff, and in 1998 he was elected to the National Legislative Assembly as a member of FUNCINPEC. In 2000 Dien Del became chairman of the National Assembly's Interior, National Defence, Investigation, and Suppression Commission. For over fifteen years, he exercised a prominent role as an advisor to the Government of Cambodia.

== Death ==
Dien Del died in a hospital in Phnom Penh on February 13, 2013. His body was cremated at the Tuek Thla Pagoda in Tuek Thla, Phnom Penh.

== Journalists’ observations ==
As an officer and a leader, General Dien commanded respect from his superiors, his colleagues, his subordinates, and many other observers. Journalists Henry Kamm and Jon Swain saw him in combat on several occasions and admired his appearance of calm control: "General Dien Del, perhaps [the army's] best general, a man with a merry sparkle in his eyes…strutted up and down in his tiger suit, pistol at his hip, saying he would fight to the last." Ex-Special Forces Colonel Jim Morris found him a savvy tactician when observing General Dien's operations during the 1985 Vietnamese assault: "Dien Del wisely used his main force units to defend KPNLF settlements."

== Bibliography ==
- Kenneth Conboy, FANK: A History of the Cambodian Armed Forces, 1970-1975, Equinox Publishing (Asia) Pte Ltd, Djakarta 2011. ISBN 978-979-3780-86-3
- Kenneth Conboy, Kenneth Bowra, and Mike Chappell, The War in Cambodia 1970-75, Men-at-arms series 209, Osprey Publishing Ltd, London 1989. ISBN 0-85045-851-X
- Justin Corfield and Laura Summers, Historical Dictionary of Cambodia, Asian/Oceanian Historical Dictionaries No. 43, Scarecrow Press, Inc., Lanham, Maryland, and Oxford 2003. ISBN 0-8108-4524-5 –
- Sak Sutsakhan, The Khmer Republic at War and the Final Collapse, U.S. Army Center of Military History, Washington D.C. 1980. – available online at Vietnam.ttu.edu Part 1 PDF, Part 2 (PDF), Part 3 (PDF), Part 4 (PDF).
