= Khok Sung district =

Khok Sung โคกสูง
- District
- District location in Sa Kaeo province
- Coordinates: 13°50′0″N 102°36′54″E
- Country: Thailand
- Province: Sa Kaeo
- Seat: Khok Sung

Area
  - Total: 439.7 km^{2} (169.8 sq mi)

Population (2005)
  - Total: 25,686
  - Density: 58.4/km^{2} (151/sq mi)
- Time zone: UTC+7 (ICT)
- Postal code: 27120
- Geocode: 2708

Khok Sung (Thai: โคกสูง, pronounced [kʰôːk sǔːŋ]) is a district (amphoe) in the eastern part of Sa Kaeo province, eastern Thailand.

== Geography ==
Neighboring districts are (from the south clockwise) Aranyaprathet, Watthana Nakhon and Ta Phraya of Sa Kaeo Province, and to the east, Banteay Meanchey of Cambodia.

== History ==
The minor district (king amphoe) was established 15 July 1996 with area split from Ta Phraya district.

On 15 May 2007, all 81 minor districts were upgraded to full districts. With its publication in the Royal Gazette on 24 August 2007, the upgrade became official.

The district was the site of the Nong Chan Refugee Camp for Khmer refugees.

== Administration ==
The district is divided into four sub-districts (tambons), which are further subdivided into 38 villages (mubans). There are no municipal (thesaban) areas. There are four tambon administrative organizations (TAO).

No.	Name	Thai name	Villages	Pop.
1.	Khok Sung	โคกสูง	10	6,780
2.	Nong Muang	หนองม่วง	13	9,492
3.	Nong Waeng	หนองแวง	9	6,356
4.	Non Mak Mun	โนนหมากมุ่น	6	3,058
