= Khleangs =

Buildings in Angkor Thom, Cambodia

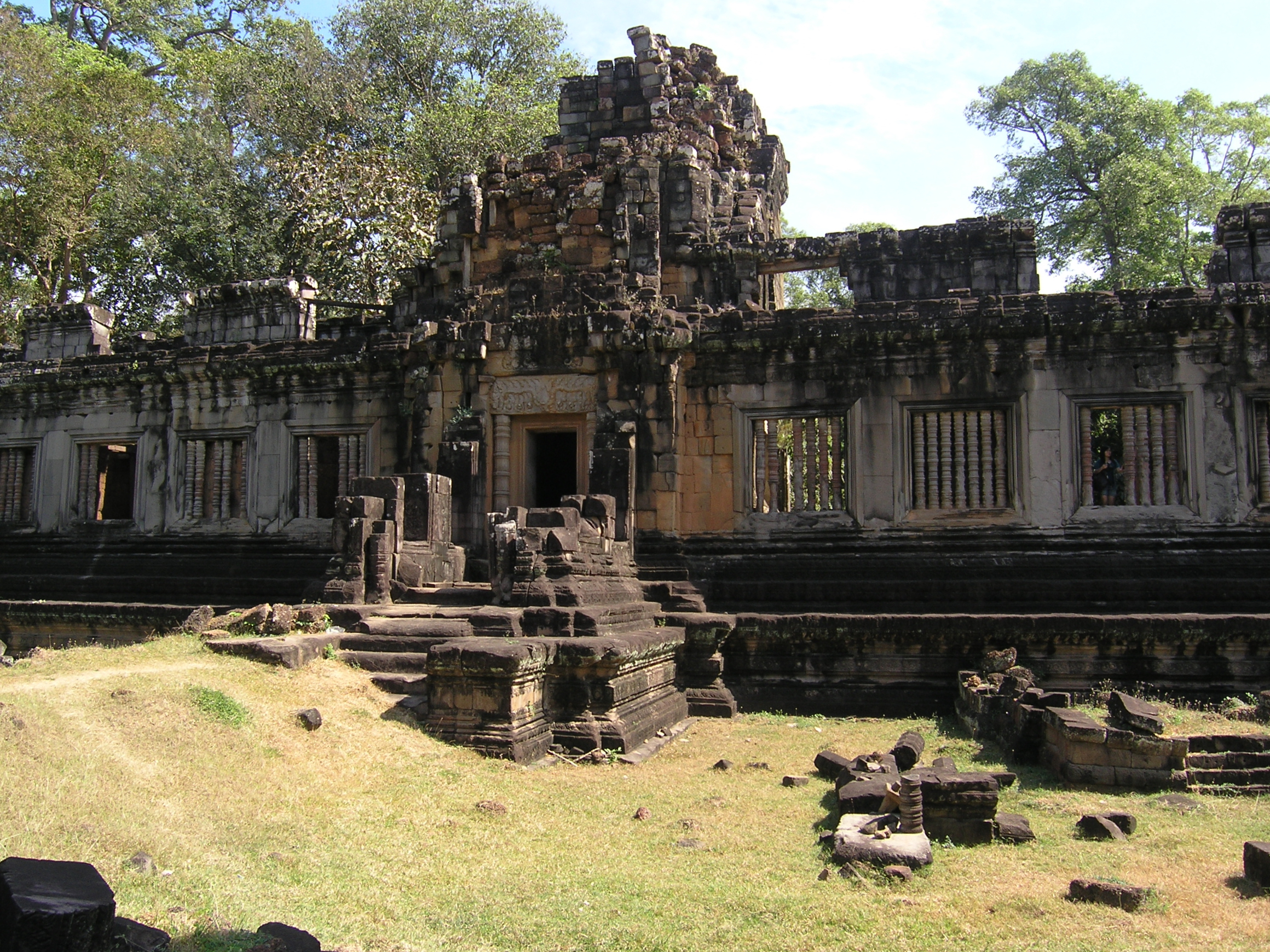
- North Khleang

- Location in Cambodia

Religion
- Affiliation: Hinduism
- District: Angkor Thom

Location
- Location: Angkor
- State: Siem Reap
- Country: Cambodia
- Interactive map of Khleangs
- Coordinates: 13°26′49″N 103°51′37″E

Architecture
- Type: Khmer (Khleang style)
- Creator: Jayaviravarman and Suryavarman I
- Completed: end of the 10th century
- Temple: 2

The Khleangs are two buildings of unknown purpose on the east side of the Royal Square in Angkor Thom, Cambodia, located just behind the twelve towers of Prasat Suor Prat and separated by the royal route that leads from the Angkor Thom Royal Palace to the Victory Gate. They are oriented along the north-south axis. The two were not built at the same time—the northern building (North Khleang) was built under King Jayaviravarman and the southern (South Khleang) under his successor Suryavarman I—but they are of similar design (although South Khleang is slight narrower). They have given their name to the Khleang style, which is characterised by relatively simple lintels with a central kala. Other buildings in the style are Phimeanakas and Ta Keo.

Rectangular sandstone buildings set opposite the Elephants Terrace, behind the Prasat Suor Prat. ‘Khleang’ means ‘storeroom’ but it is unlikely that this was the function of the structures, A royal oath of allegiance is carved into the doorway of one Khleang indicating that they may have served as reception areas or even housing for visiting noblemen and ambassadors. The North Khleang was built in wood under Rajendravarman II and then rebuilt in stone by Jayavaraman V, probably before the construction of the South Khleang. The Khleangs are unremarkable upon close inspection but picturesque from a distance, standing among the Prasat Suor Prat.

== Gallery ==
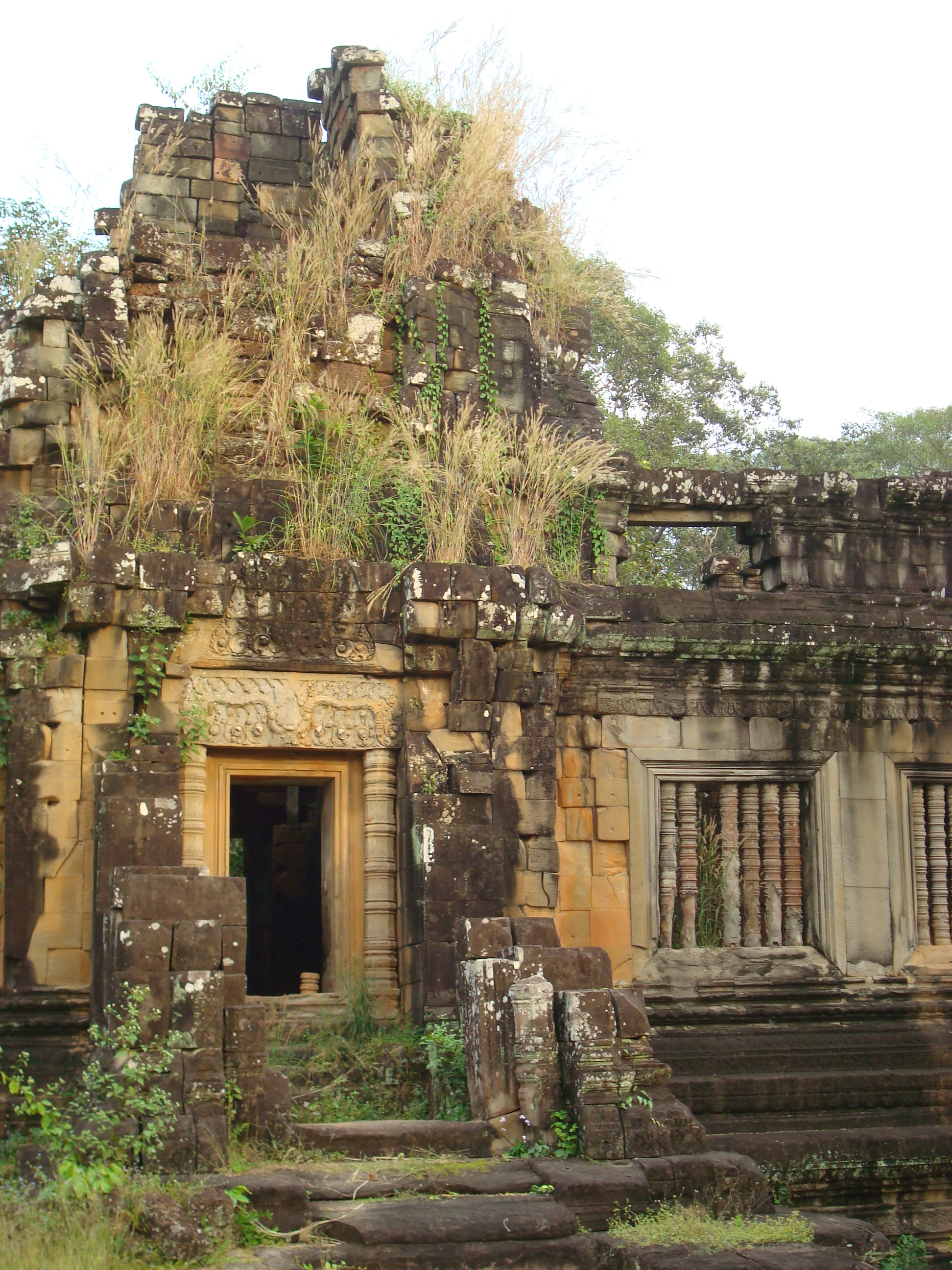

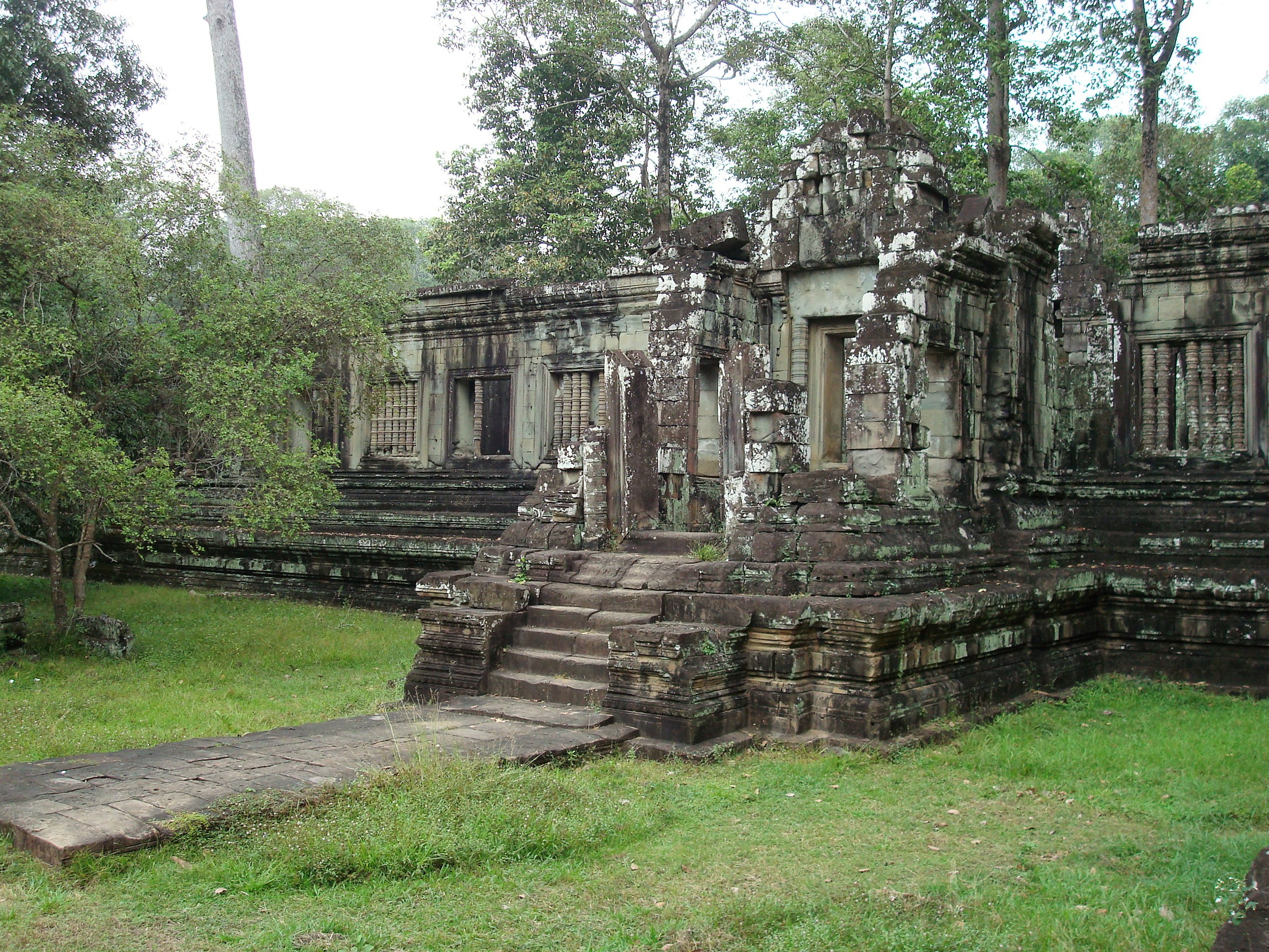

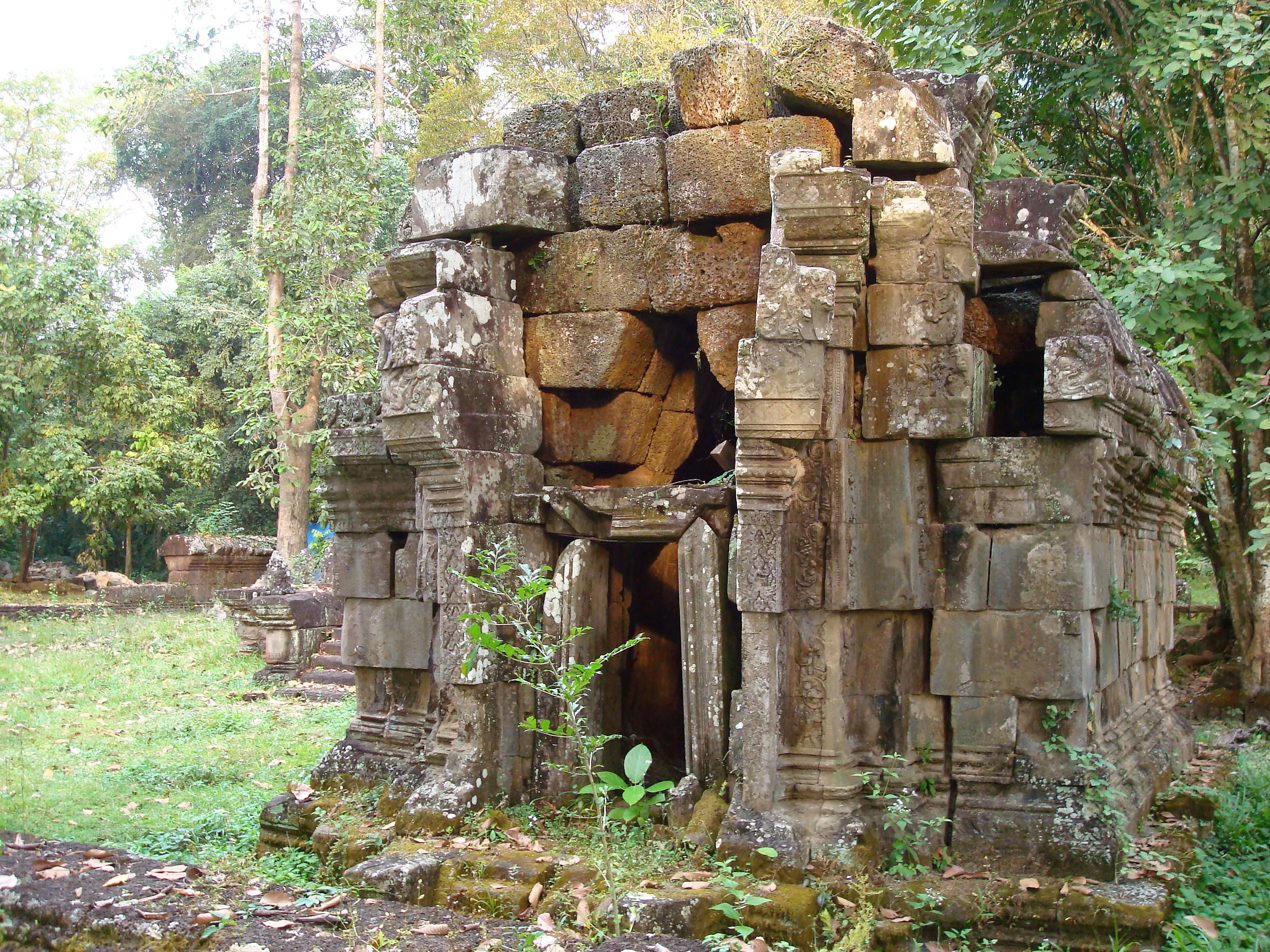

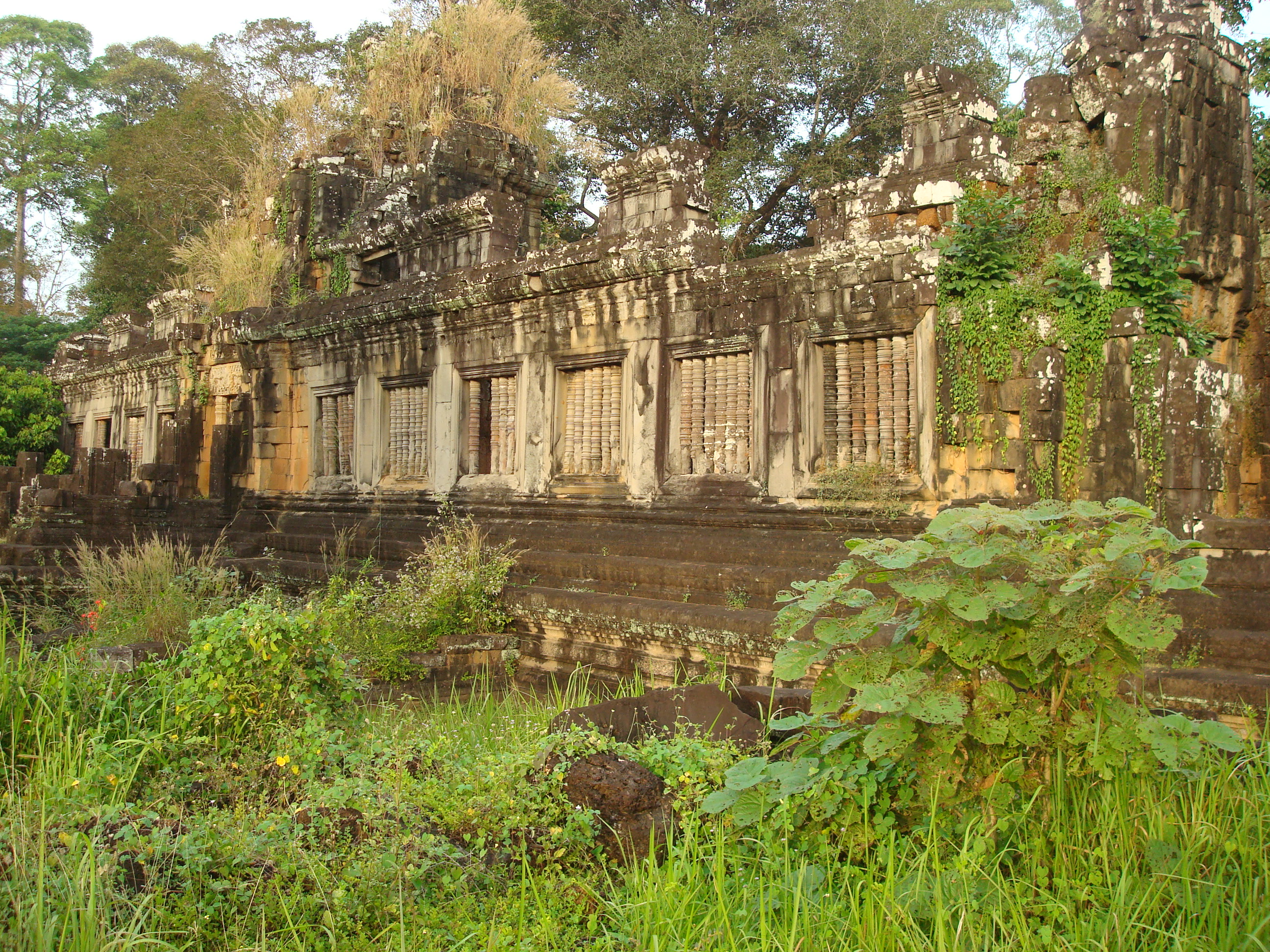

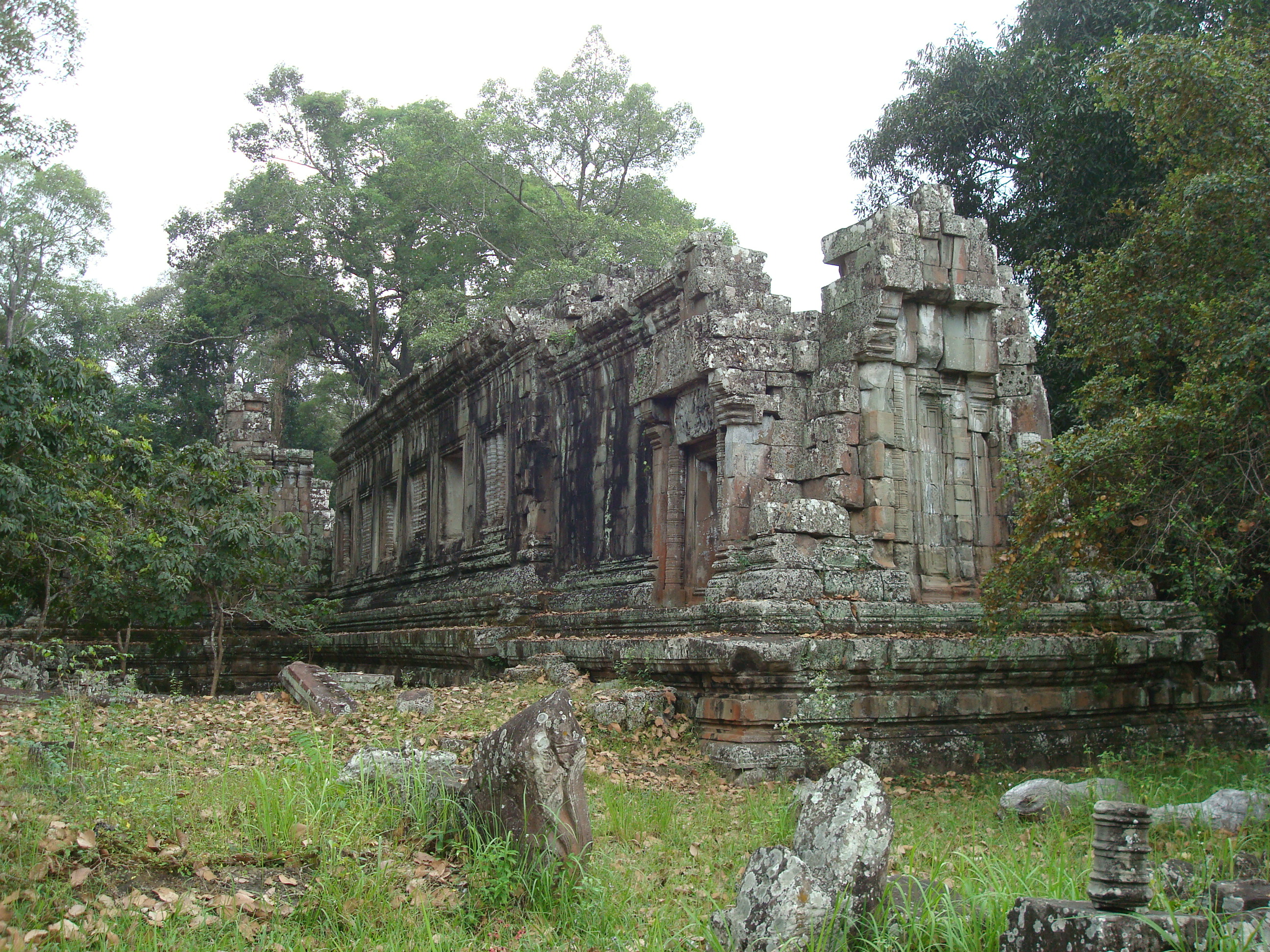

== See also ==
- Khmer
- Angkor Wat
- Angkor Thom
- Khmer Empire
