= Mangalartha =

- មង្គលាថ៌
- Central tower of the temple

- Location within Cambodia

Religion
- Affiliation: Hinduism
- Province: Siem Reap

Location
- Location: Angkor Thom
- Country: Cambodia
- Interactive map of Mangalartha
- Coordinates: 13°26′37″N 103°52′04″E

Architecture
- Style: Khmer (Bayon)
- Creator: Jayavarman VIII
- Completed: 1295 AD

Mangalartha (Khmer: មង្គលាថ៌), or East Tob Temple (Khmer: ប្រាសាទតុបខាងកើត) or Monument 487 (Khmer: ប្រាសាទលេខ៤៨៧), is a small Hindu temple at Angkor, Cambodia.

It is located in Angkor Thom, south of Victory Way, at the end of a track in the jungle which begins some 300 m before the Victory Gate. As it consists of a small ruined shrine on a basement, overgrown with vegetation, it is one of less visited temples of Angkor.

It was dedicated on Thursday 28 April 1295 CE, according to its four sided inscribed stele, and its importance is all about being the last of the known Angkor monuments dated with precision.

It was built in sandstone during the reign of Jayavarman VIII, in honour of a Brahmin scholar called Mangalartha, assimilated to Vishnu. It's cruciform in plan and opens to east, while on the other cardinal points there are false doors. The sanctuary chamber sheltered two statues, one of Mangalartha and the other of his mother, whose pedestal is still in place. The pediments lie on the ground. They show Vishnu reclining on Shesha, the three strides of Vishnu to regain the World, Shiva dancing with four arms and Krishna lifting Mount Govardhana.
