= Prasat Chrung =

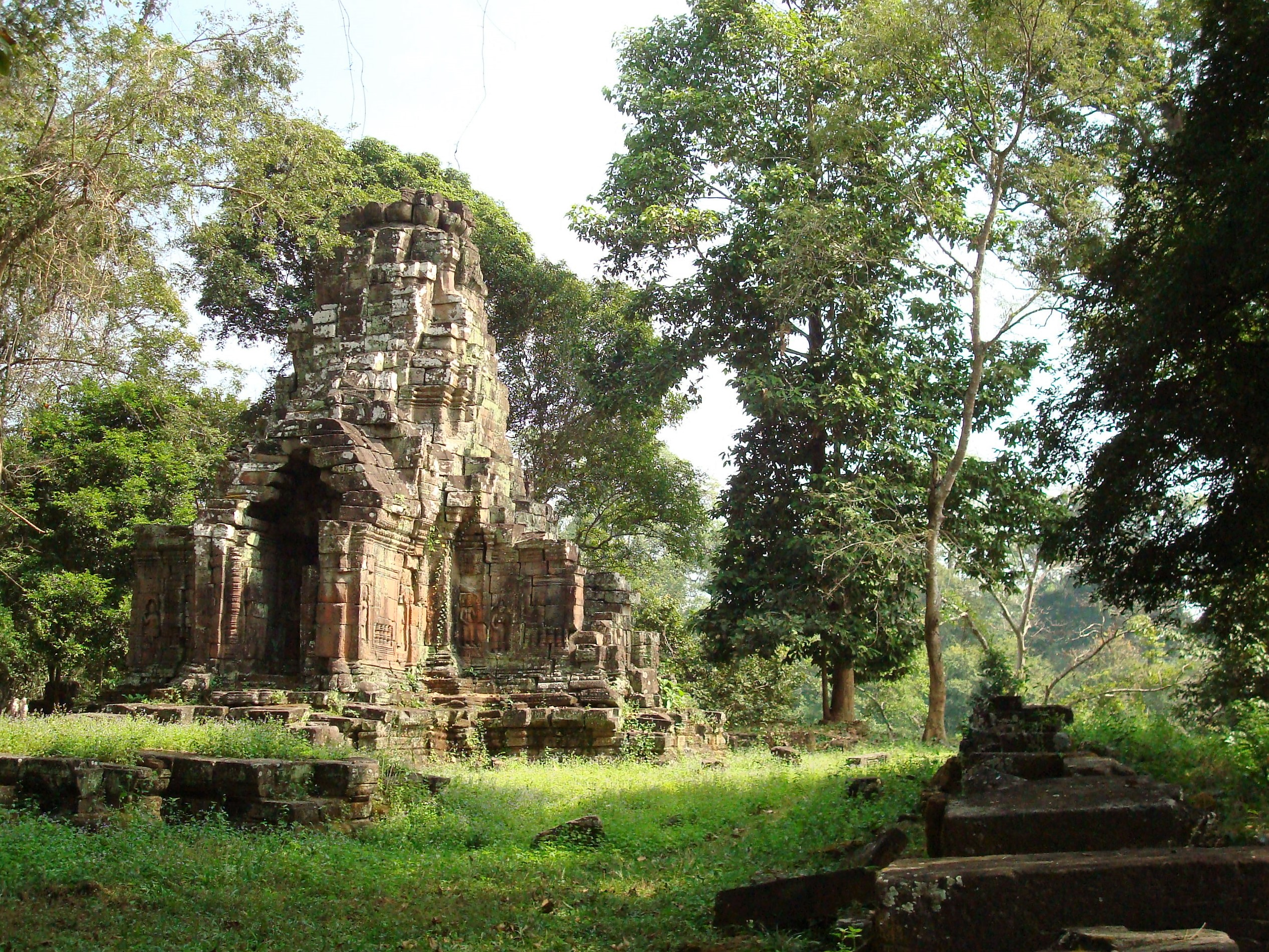
- The central tower of the temple

Religion
- Affiliation: Hinduism
- District: Angkor Thom
- Province: Siem Reap
- Deity: Bodhisatta Lokesvara

Location
- Location: Angkor Thom
- Country: Cambodia
- Interactive map of Prasat Chrung

Architecture
- Type: Khmer, (Bayon style)
- Creator: Jayavarman VII
- Completed: Late 12th century or later
- Temple: 4

Prasat Chrung (Khmer: ប្រាសាទជ្រុង) are temples that located at each corner of the Angkor Thom, on the earth embankment that reaches almost to the top of the walls, is a small temple known as Prasat Chrung (Shrine of the Angle) in modern Khmer. These four sandstone temples, in the style of Bayon, were Buddhist and dedicated to the Bodhisatta Lokesvara, as was the Bayon and the city. Cross-shaped in plan and facing to the east side. The sanctuary surrounded by a tower and originally steles with a poem praising the king were housed in small adjacent structures. Each stele has four different authors. Today these are housed in the Conservation office. Some of the originally Buddhist pediments were defaced in the late 13th century during the reign of king Jayavarman VIII and the figure of the Buddha was transformed into a linga.
