= Prasat Suor Prat =

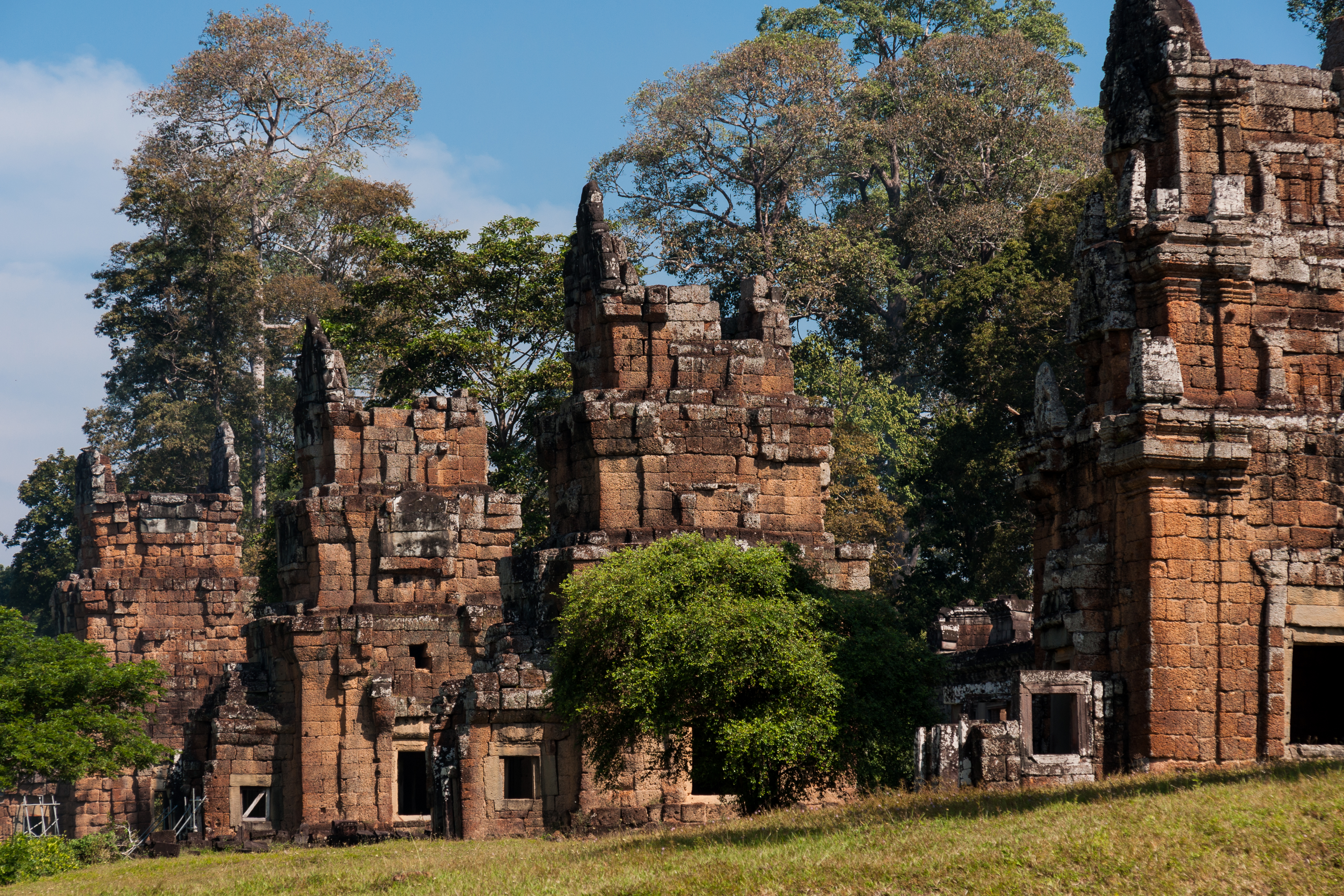
- Four towers of Prasat Suor Prat

- Location in Cambodia

Religion
- Affiliation: Hinduism
- District: Angkor Thom
- Province: Siem Reap

Location
- Location: Angkor
- Country: Cambodia
- Interactive map of Prasat Suor Prat
- Coordinates: 13°26′49″N 103°51′37″E

Architecture
- Creator: Jayavarman VII
- Completed: late 12th century
- Temple: 12 towers

Prasat Suor Prat (Khmer: ប្រាសាទសួព្រ័ត) is a series of twelve towers spanning north to south lining the eastern side of a royal square in Angkor Thom, near the town of Siem Reap, Cambodia. The towers are made from rugged laterite and sandstone. They are right in front of Terrace of the Elephants and Terrace of the Leper King, flanking the start of the road leading east to the Victory Gate, on either side of which they are symmetrically arranged. Their function remains unknown.

The current tower's name in Khmer means "The towers of the tightrope dancers," a romantic idea derived from the local belief that they were used to support a high wire stretched between them for acrobatics during royal festivals. This belief, however, is irrelevant. Zhou Daguan describes in his records that the towers are used to settle disputes among Angkorian people.

The temple was possibly built during the reign of Indravarman II.

"In front of the palace there are twelve small stone towers. When two men dispute over some unknown matter, each of the contestants is forced to sit in one of them while the relatives stand watch at the base. After three or four days, he who is wrong shows it by suffering some illness - ulcers, or catarrh, or malignant fever - while the other remains in perfect health. Thus right or wrong is determined by what is called 'divine judgement'...

— "The Customs of Cambodia", Zhou Daguan.

Among the twelve towers, the structures identified as N1 tower and N2 antechamber were in danger of collapse and were reconstructed in 2001-2005 by JSA (Japanese Government Team for Safeguarding of Angkor) and APSARA.

== Gallery ==
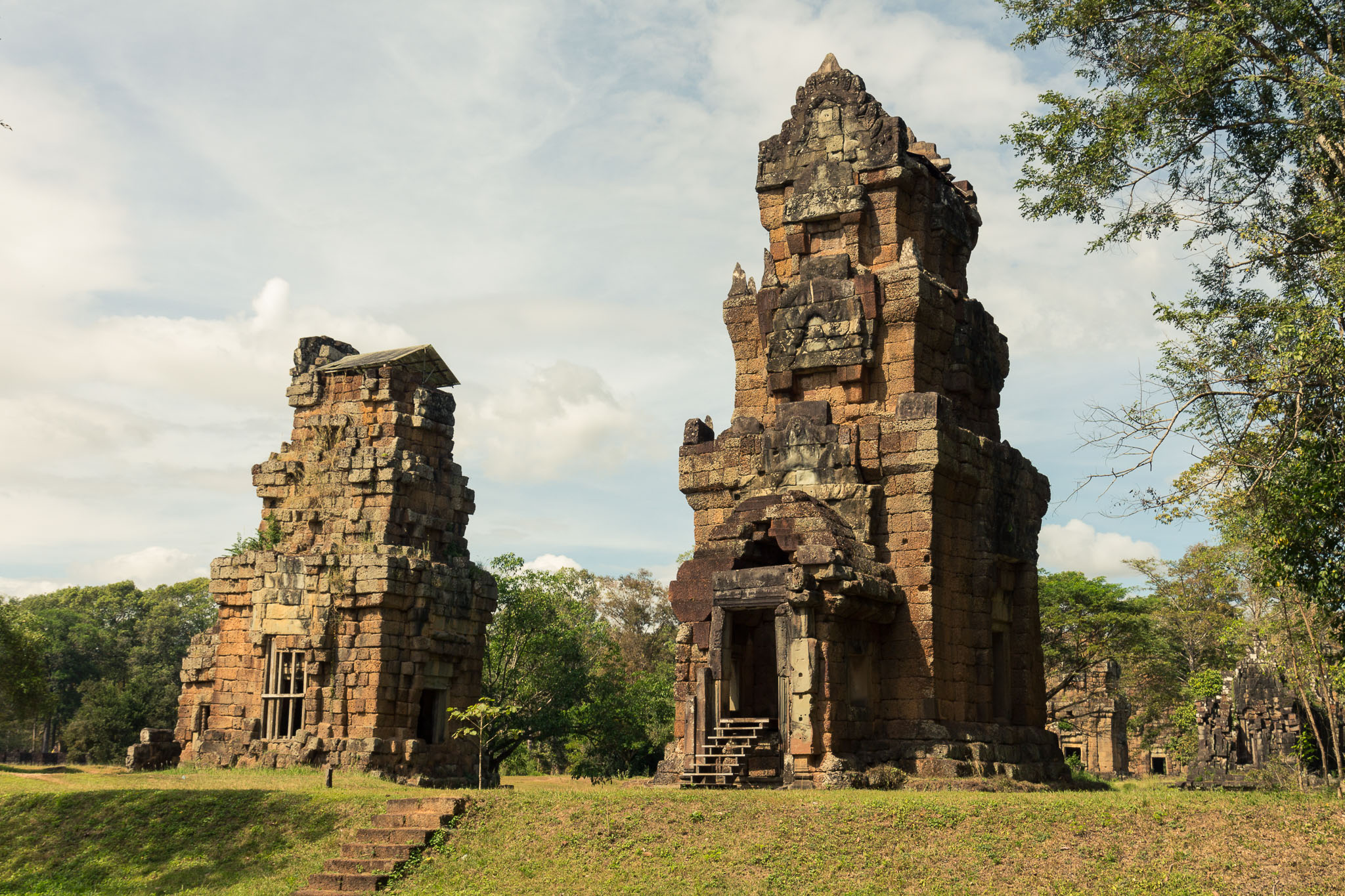

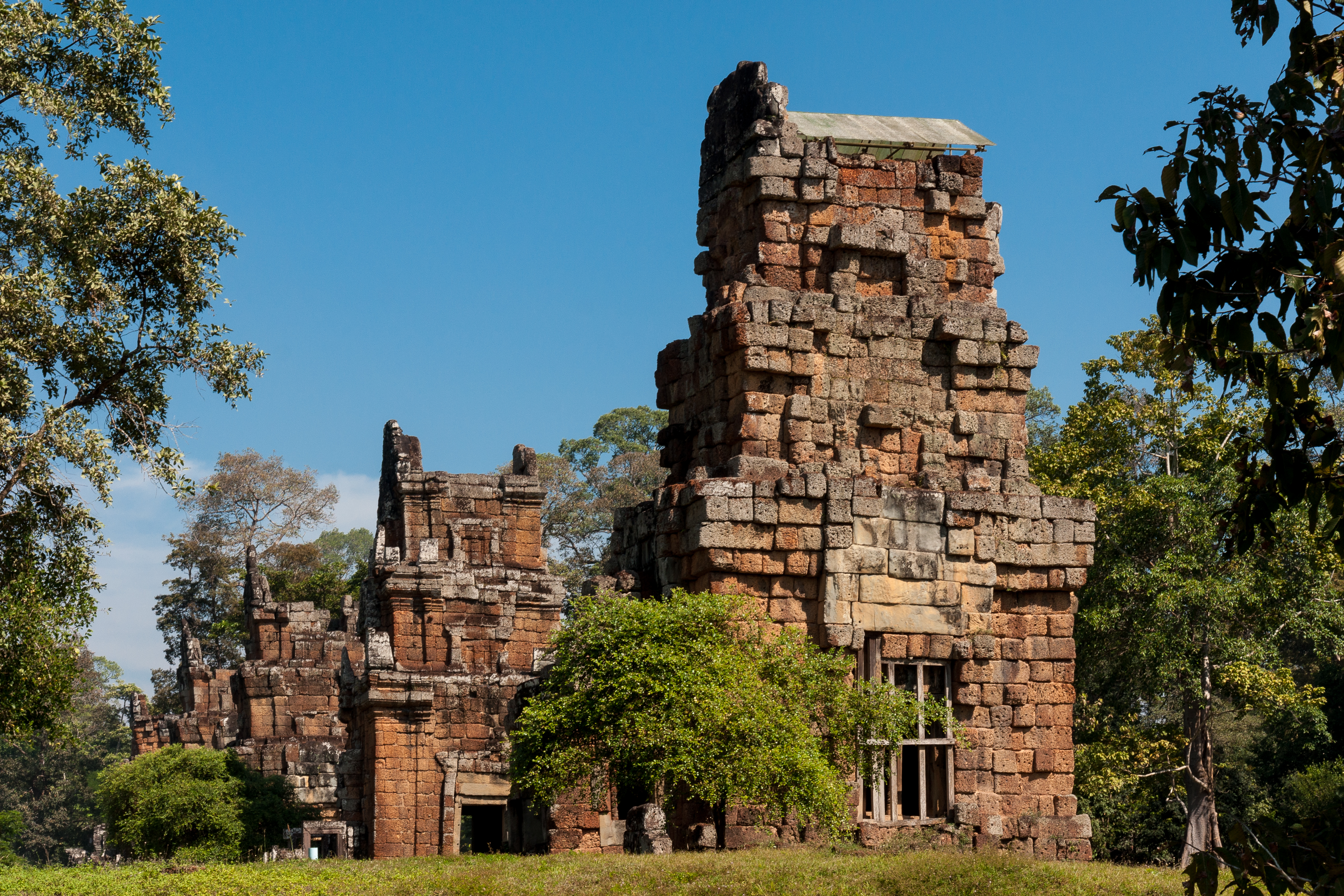

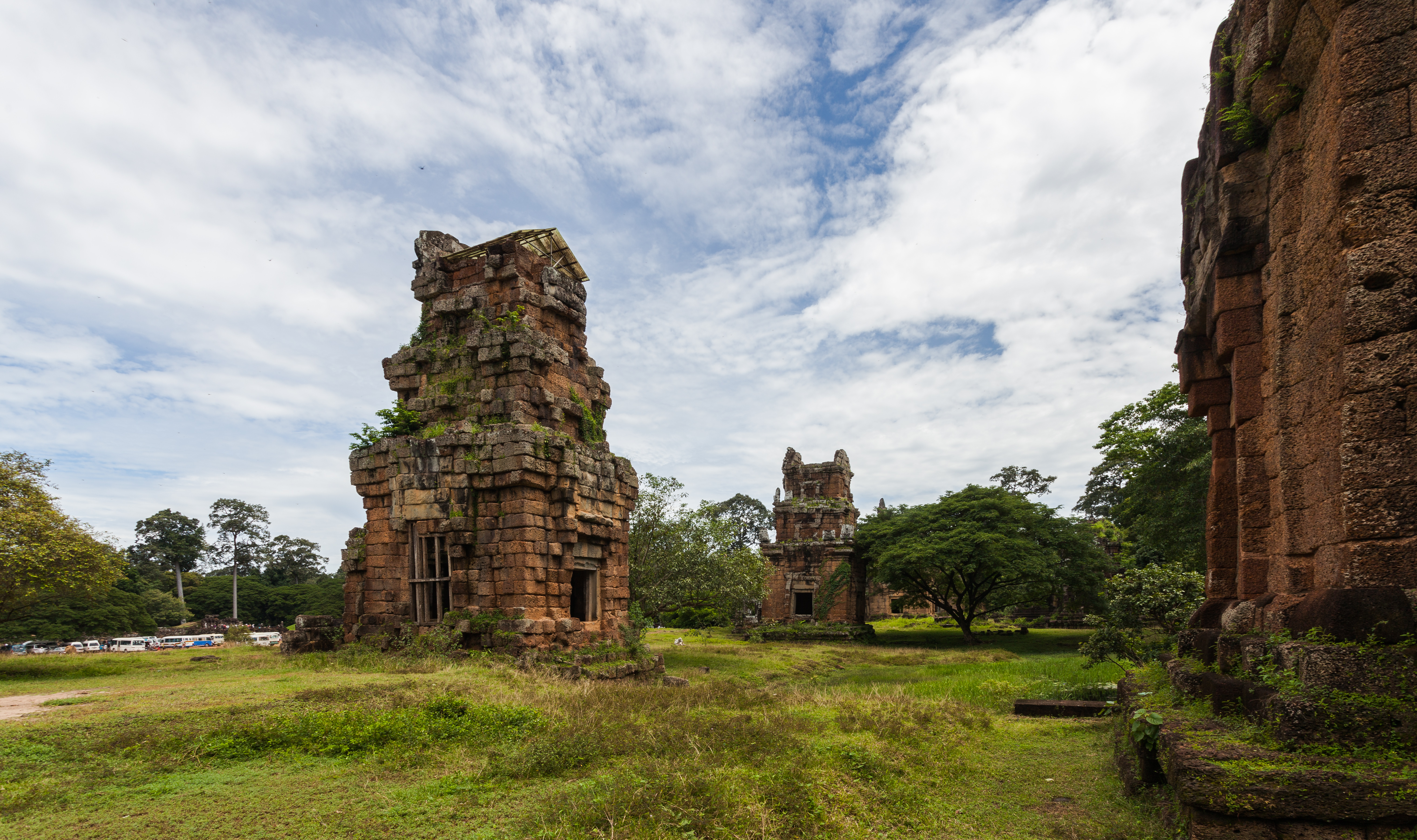

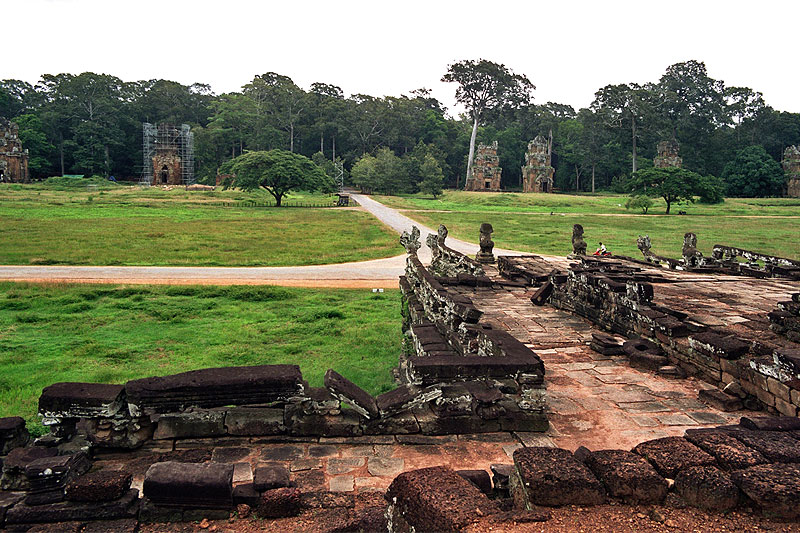

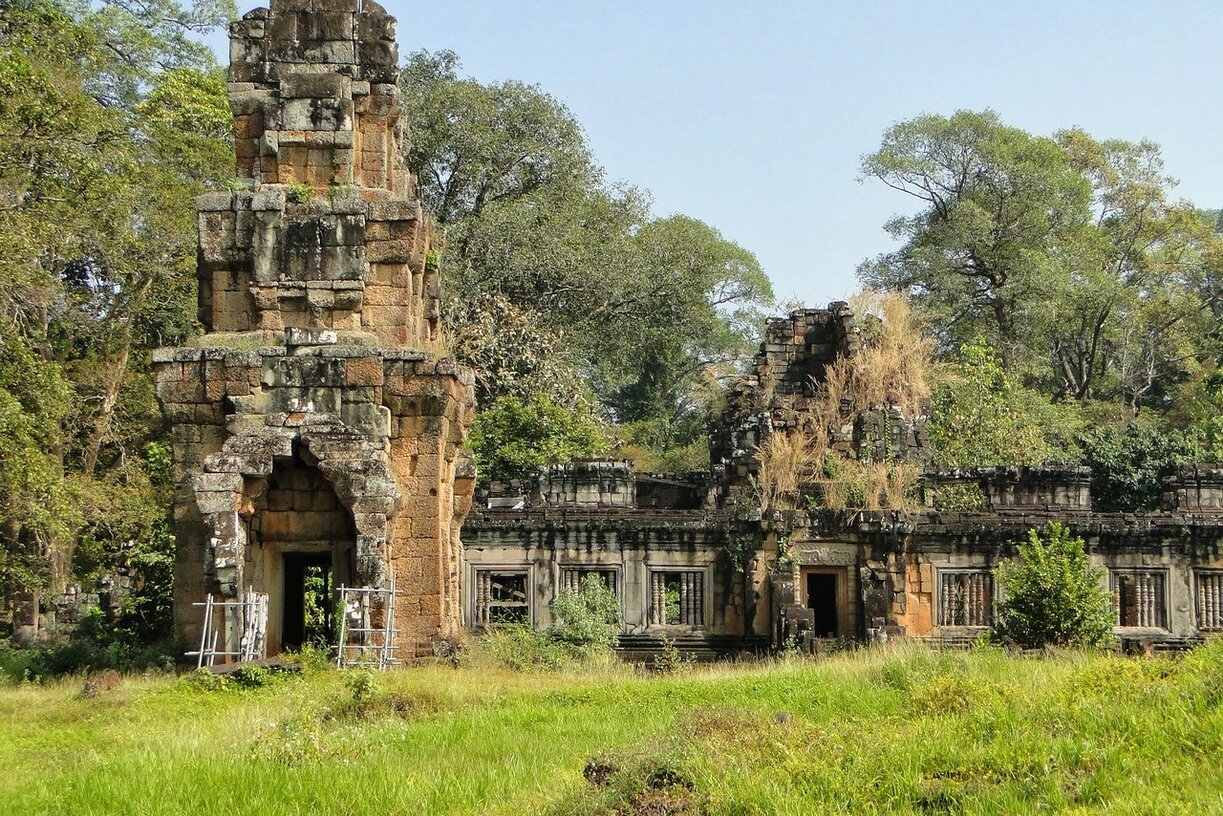
