= Bat Chum =

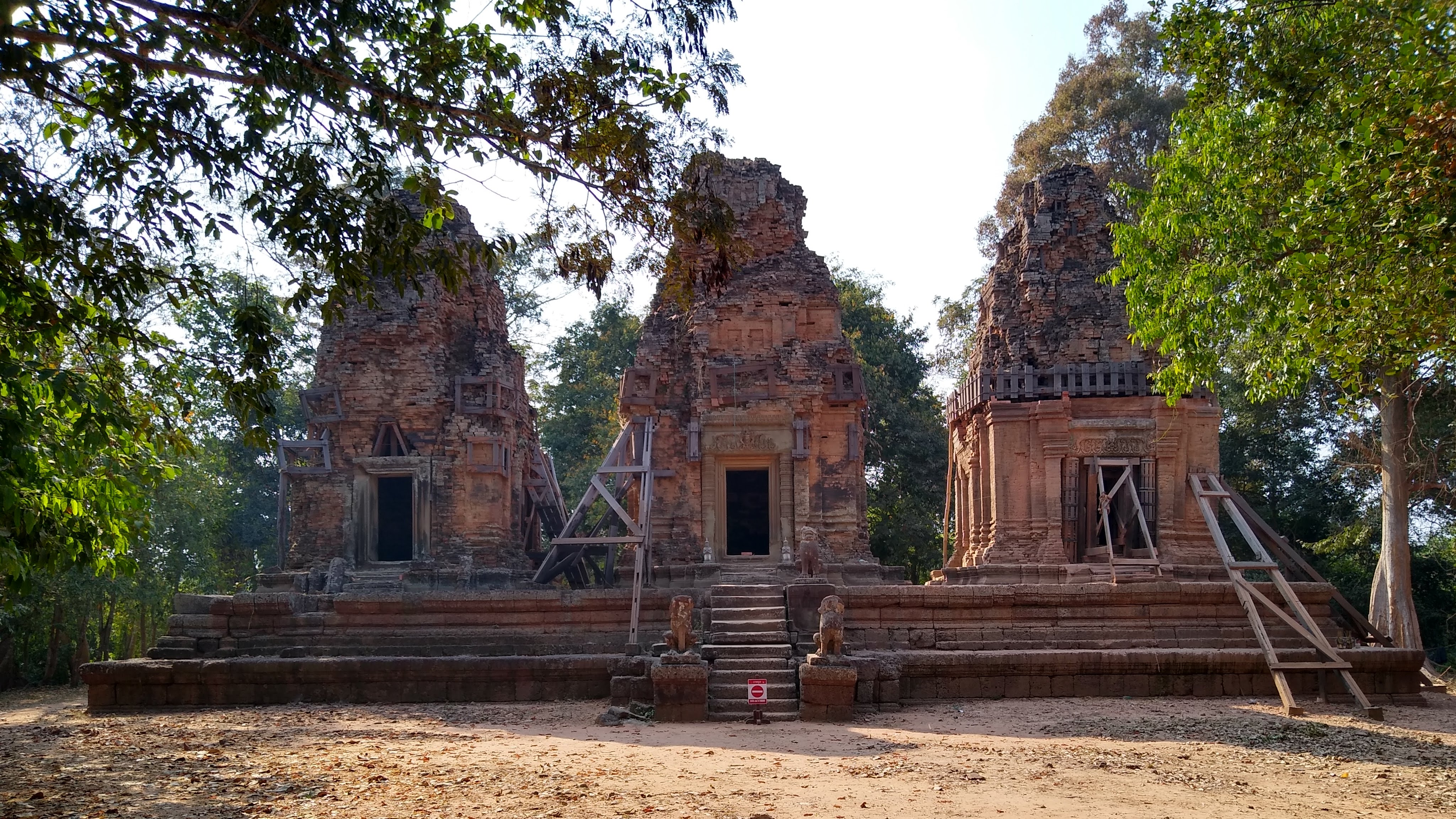

- Location in Cambodia

Religion
- Affiliation: Buddhism other_info =: Sect: [[{{{sect}}}]]
- Province: Siem Reap
- Deity: Buddha

Location
- Location: Angkor
- Country: Cambodia
- Interactive map of Bat Chum
- Coordinates: 13°25′29″N 103°54′27″E

Architecture
- Architect: Kavindrarimathana
- Type: Khmer (Pre Rup style)
- Creator: Rajendravarman
- Completed: Mid 10th century AD
- Temple: 3 towers
- Inscriptions: 3 (1 in each 3 towers)

Bat Chum (Khmer: ប្រាសាទបាទជុំ) is a Buddhist temple built by Kavindrarimathana, a learned Buddhist minister of Khmer king Rajendravarman, at the middle of the 10th century. It is about 400 meters (1,300 ft) south of Srah Srang, at Angkor, Cambodia.

It consists of three inline brick towers (in poor conditions at present), standing on the same platform, surrounded by an enclosure and a moat, with a single gopura to the east.

On the doorjambs there are Buddhist inscriptions that mention Kavindrarimathana, the "architect" (or official in charge for construction) who built Srah Srang, East Mebon, and maybe planned the temple-mountain of Pre Rup. The latter was dedicated in 960 AD, shortly before death of the architect. There were houses and a Buddhist monastery near the temple, but these wooden structures have been gone for a long time.

During the excavations in 1952, in the northern and central towers, flagstones showing a yantra were found, which George Coedès was able to reconstitute and with extreme difficulty link to the Buddhist divinities mentioned on doorjambs.

In every tower there is a different inscription signed by three different persons. The last verse of each of the three refers to the elephants as "dyke breakers".

== Gallery ==
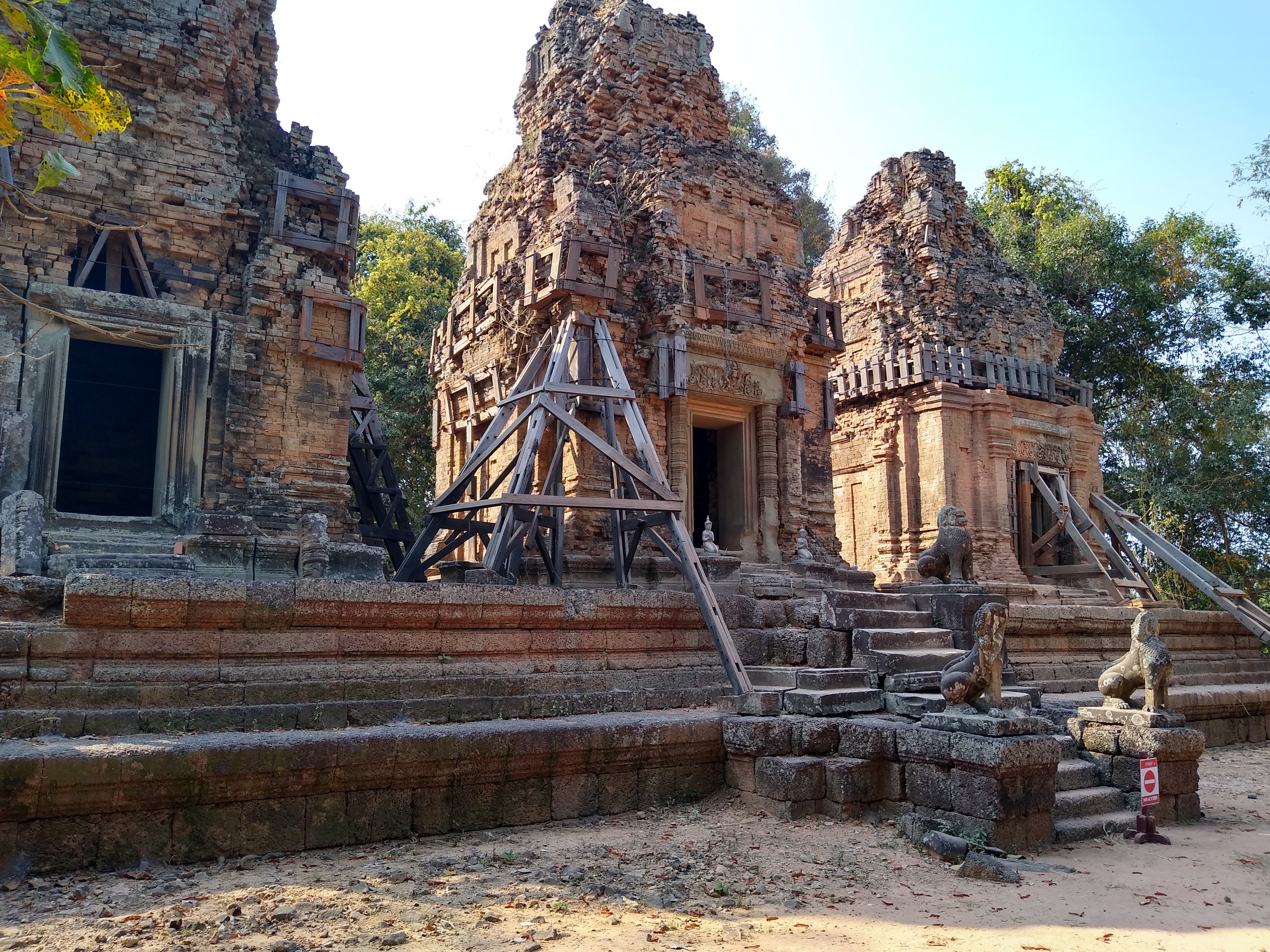
The temple

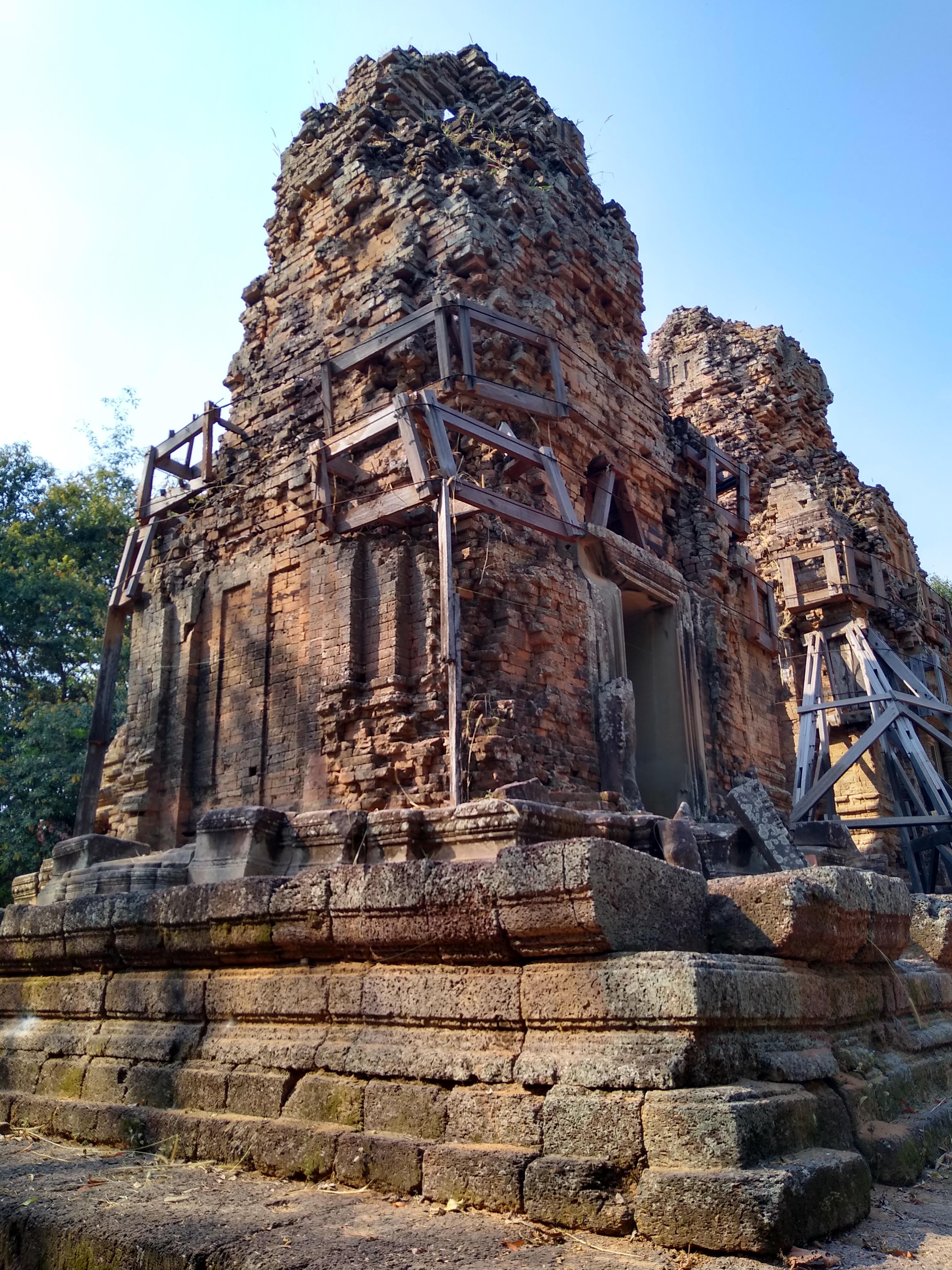
Left tower

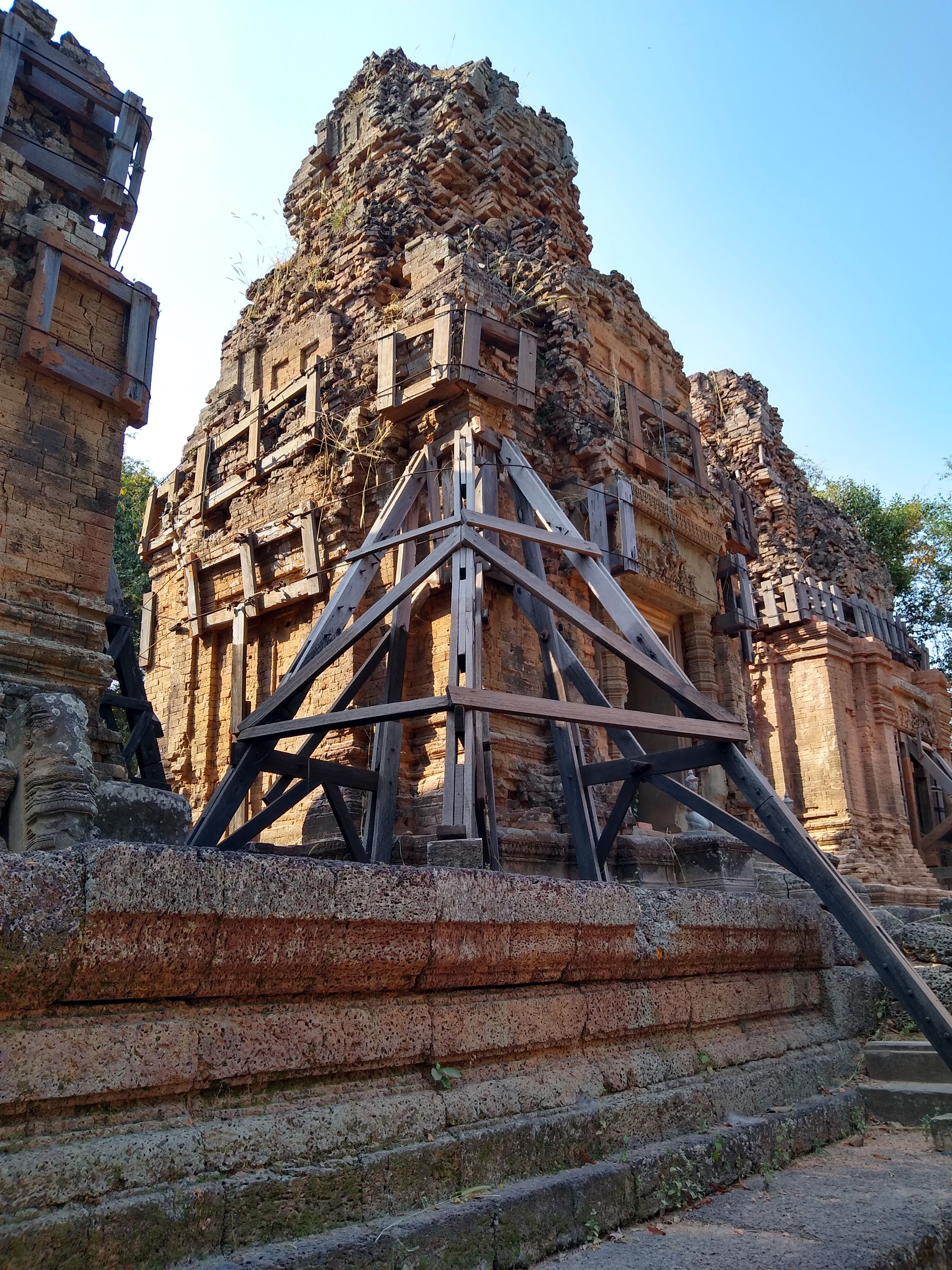
Middle tower

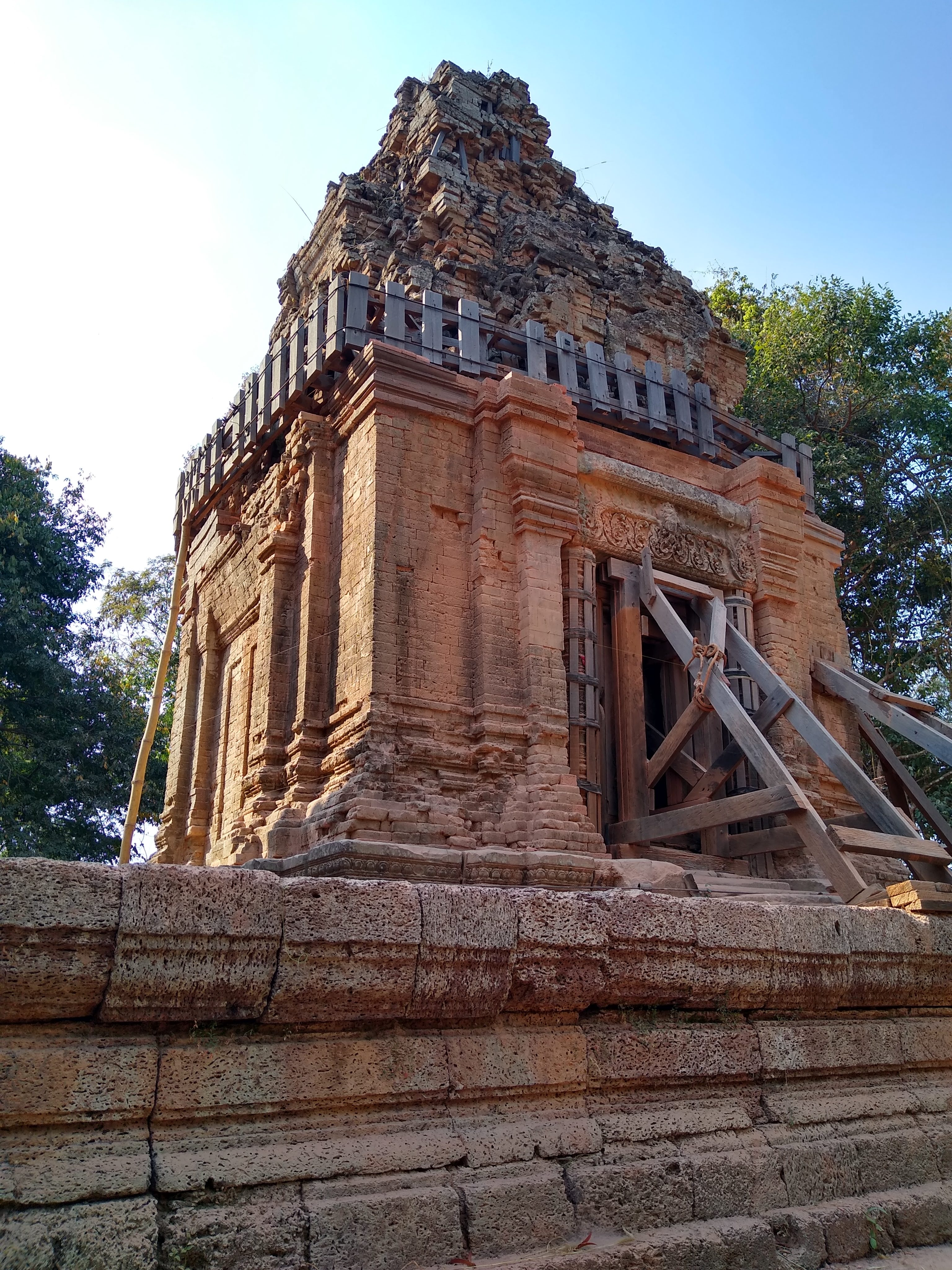
Right tower

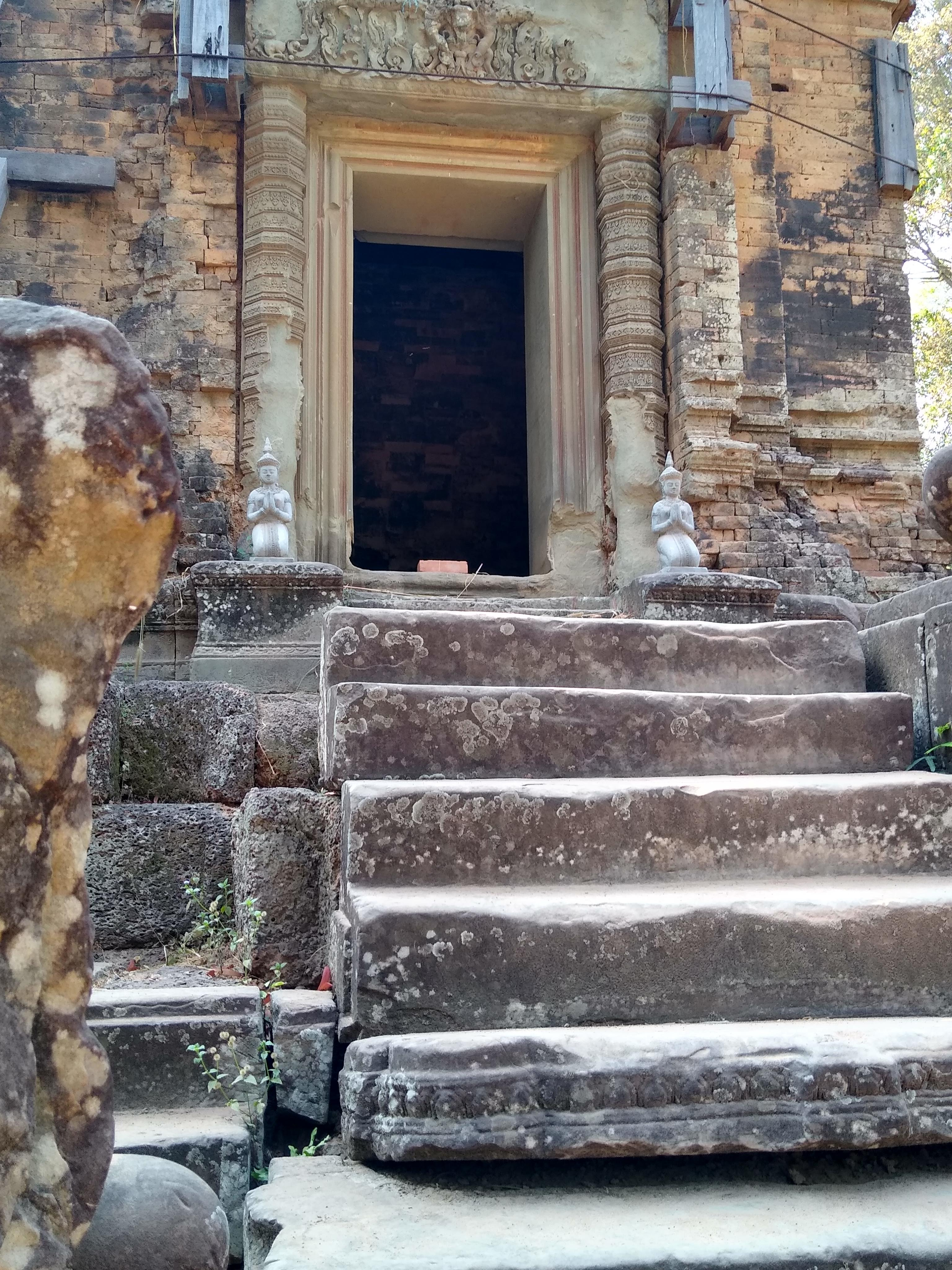
Door to the middle tower

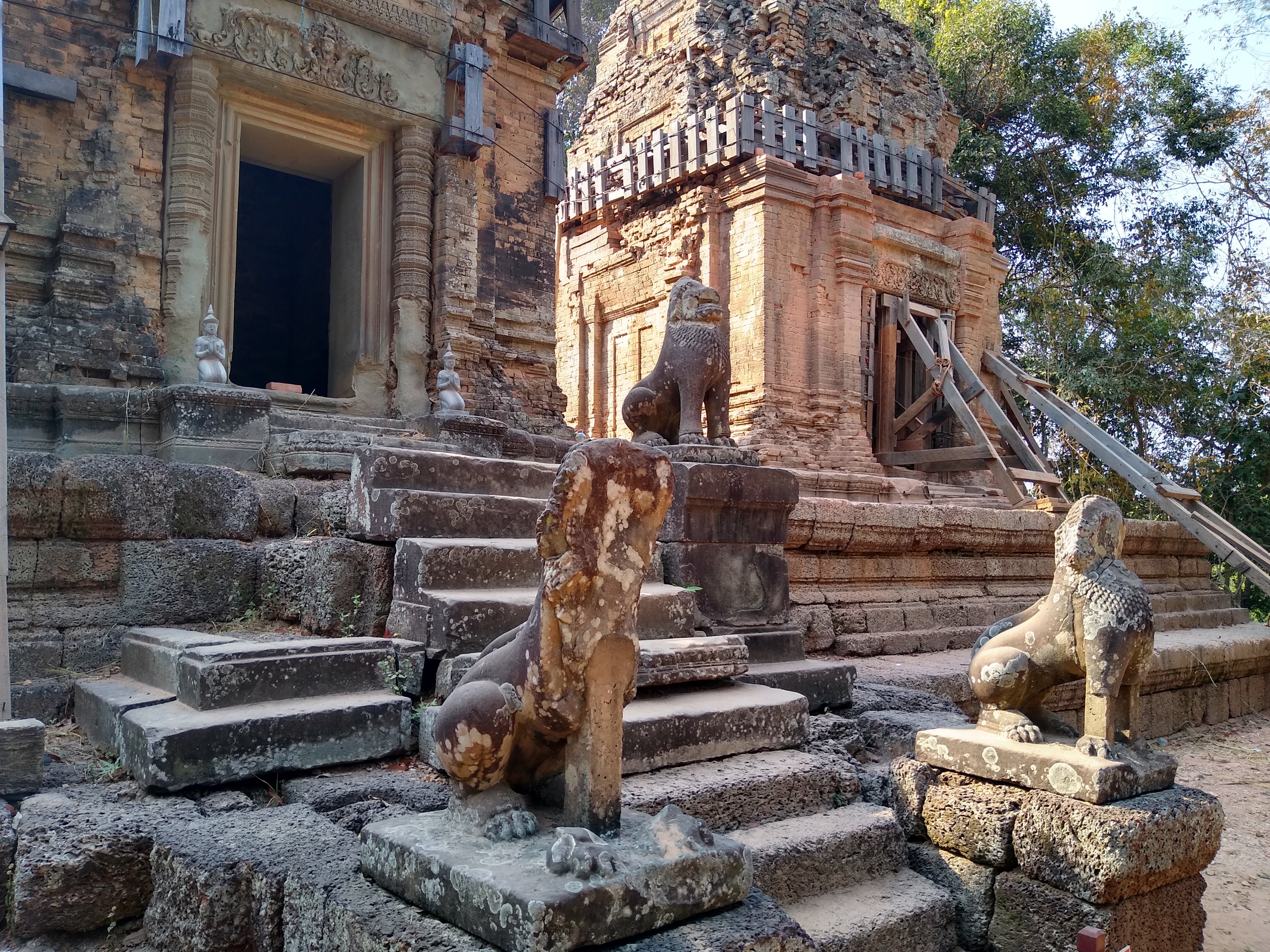
Stone lions
