= Banteay Kdei =

Temple

Prasat Banteay Kdei The Citadel of Chambers
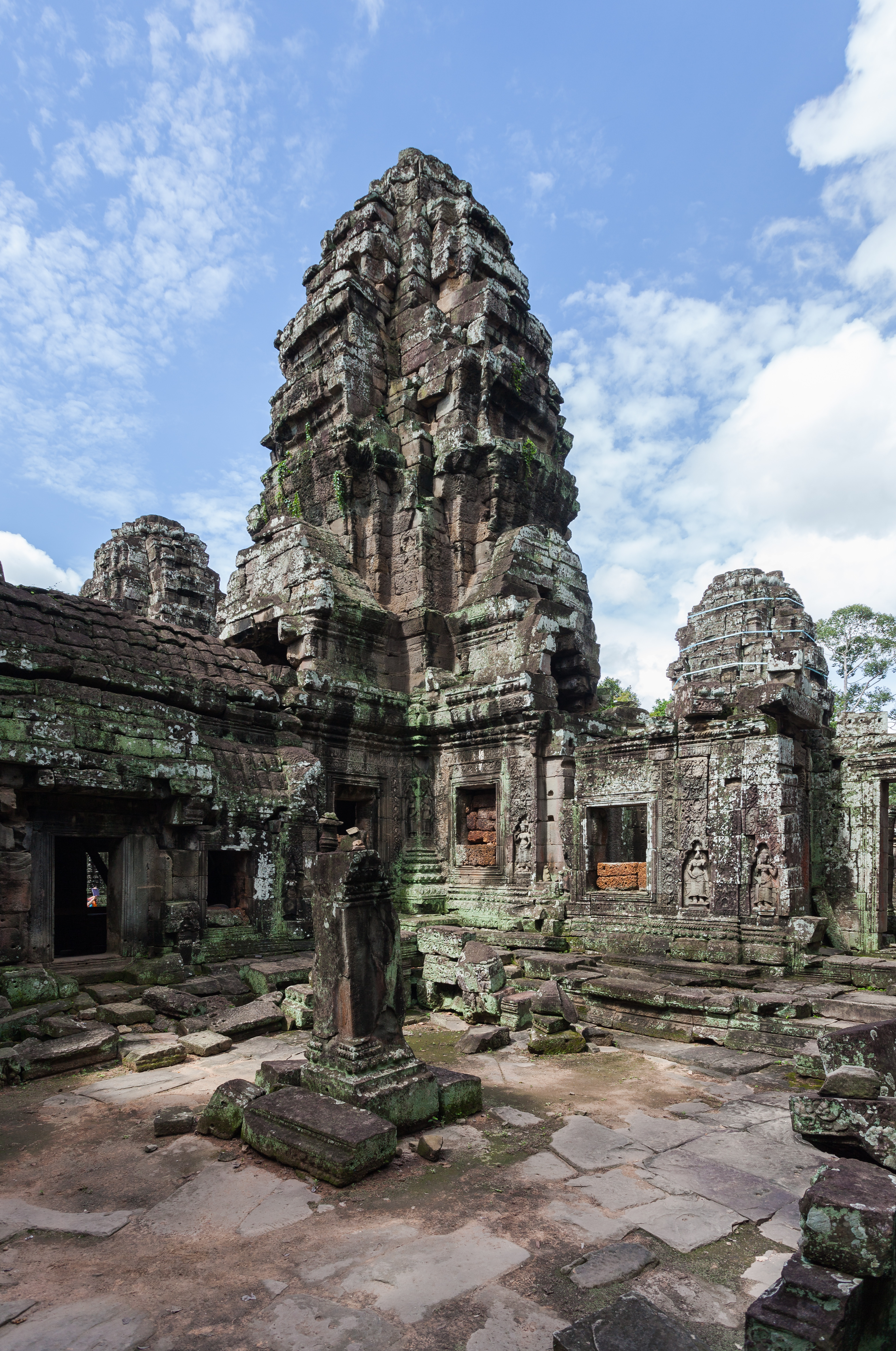
- Banteay Kdei, Angkor

- Location in Cambodia

Religion
- Affiliation: Buddhism other_info =: Sect: [[{{{sect}}}]]
- District: Siem Reap
- Province: Siem Reap
- Deity: Avalokitesvara, Buddhist Temple

Location
- Location: Angkor
- Country: Cambodia
- Coordinates: 13°25′47″N 103°53′54″E

Architecture
- Type: Bayan and Angkor architecture
- Creator: Jayavarman VII
- Completed: 12th to 13th centuries
- Monument: Several

Banteay Kdei (Khmer: ប្រាសាទបន្ទាយក្តី; Prasat Bantiay Kdei, lit. 'A Citadel of Chambers'), also known as "Citadel of Monks' cells", is a Buddhist temple in Angkor, Cambodia. It is located southeast of Ta Prohm and east of Angkor Thom. Built in the mid-12th to early 13th centuries AD during the reign of Jayavarman VII (who was posthumously given the title "Maha paramasangata pada"), it is in the Bayon architectural style, similar in plan to Ta Prohm and Preah Khan, but less complex and smaller. Its structures are contained within two successive enclosure walls, and consist of two concentric galleries from which emerge towers, preceded to the east by a cloister.

This Buddhist monastic complex is currently dilapidated due to faulty construction and poor quality of sandstone used in its buildings, and is now undergoing renovation. Banteay Kdei had been occupied by monks at various intervals over the centuries until the 1960s.

== Geography ==
The Banteay Kdei, one of the many Angkor temples, is located in the Angkor Archaeological Park of 400 square kilometres (150 sq mi) area. The ancient city of Angkor during the Khmer Empire extended from Tonle Sap to the Kulen hills covering a vast area of 1,000 square kilometres (390 sq mi). The temple is approached from the east gopura of Ta Prohm along a 600 metres (2,000 ft) path. This path leads to the west gate entrance gopura of Banteay Kdei. It is 3 kilometres (1.9 mi) east of Angkor Thom.

== History of Banteay Kdei ==
The name Banteay Kdei originates from an earlier name, Kuti, which is mentioned in the Sdok Kak Thom. This stele describes the arrival of Jayavarman II to the area, "When they arrived at the eastern district, the king bestowed an estate and a village called Kuti upon the family of the royal chaplain." This royal chaplain was the Brahman scholar Sivakaivalya, his chief priest for the Devaraja cult.

The Khmer Empire lasted from 802 to 1431, initially under Hindu religious beliefs up to the end of the 12th century and later under Buddhist religious practices. It was a time when temples of grandeur came to be built and reached a crescendo during the reign of Suryavarman II until 1145/1150, and later in the 12th–13th centuries, under Jayavarman VII. Many Buddhist temples were built, including the Banteay Kdei, from middle of the 12th century to early 13th century. Though Jayavarman VII was credited with building many temples, he was also accused of squandering money on extravagant temple building projects at the expense of society and other duties. He built Buddhist temples in which Bodhisattva Avalokitesvara was the main deity. This temple built, conforming to the style of the Ta Prohm and Preah Khan temples in the vicinity during the same period by Jayavarman VII, but of a smaller size, was built as a Buddhist monastic complex on the site of a 10th-century temple built by Rajendravarman. Some small inscriptions attest to the building of this temple by Jayavarman VII and the royal architect, Kavindrarimathana.

Jayavarman VII had come to power at the age of 55 after defeating Chams who had invaded Angkor and subjected it to devastation. His "prodigious activity" resulted in the restoration of Cambodia from its ruins. He was chiefly the architect of the rebuilt capital at Angkor Thom and was called a "Great Builder". He was responsible for building many temples, which apart from Banteay Kdei, included the central temple of the Bayon, Prah Khan, Ta Prohm and many others, and also many rest houses for pilgrims. The reasons for building this temple at its present site is not known. However, it is established that the temple is a contemporary of the Angkor Wat as many similarities have been identified between the two, and also with Phimai temple in Thailand. It is reported to be the first temple built by Jayavarman VII in 1181 AD, opposite to the Srah Srang reservoir.

In the 13th century, most of the temples built by Jayavarman were vandalised. However, some of the Mahayana Buddhist frontons and lintels are still seen in good condition. It is also the view of some archaeologists that the temple was built by Jayavarman II in honour of his religious teacher.

The temple, which for several centuries after the Khmer reign ended, remained neglected and covered with vegetation. It was exposed after clearing the surrounding overgrowth of vegetation in 1920–1922. This work was carried out under the guidance of Henri Marchal (then Conservator of Angkor) and Ch. Battuer, by adopting a conservation principle which was known as "the principle of anastylosis, which was being employed very effectively by the Dutch authorities in Indonesia". It was partially occupied by Buddhist monks till the 1960s.

For ten years till March 2002, Sophia University Mission or the Sophia Mission of Japan carried out several Archaeological research at the Banteay Kdei temple. During these investigations, a cache of fragments of 274 Buddhist statues made in sandstone, along with a few metal art pieces, were unearthed, in 2001. Plans to build a storage room to house the statues was also planned.

== Layout ==
The sacred temple complex is cloistered and packed in a space of 65 m × 50 m (213 ft × 164 ft) with three enclosures within a large compound wall of size 700 m × 300 m (2,300 ft × 980 ft), made of laterite stones. The entry is from the east facing gopura, which is in a cruciform embellished with Lokesvara images. The temple is a treasure house of sculptures in the architectural styles of the Bayon and also of the Angkor Wat. The complex is on a single level.

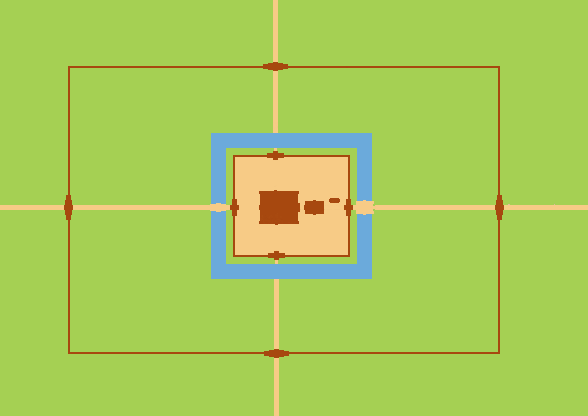
General layout plan of Banteay Kdei

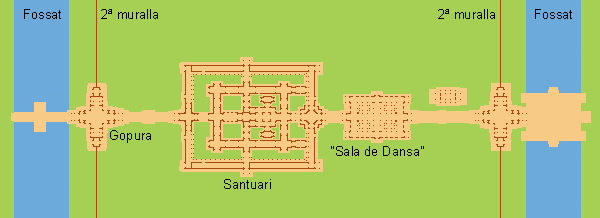
Detailed plan

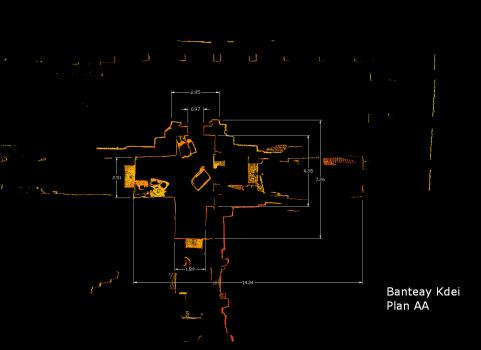
Plan of Gopura portion of complex in its present state, cut from laser scan data

External enclosure

The external enclosure with four concentric walls, has four gopuras similar to the Ta Prohm temple, and all are in some degree of preserved status. At the four corners, the gopuras have a fascia of Lokesvara (Buddhist deity, Avalokitesvara) mounted over Garuda images (it is also mentioned that the smiling faces are of King Jayavarman II, similar to those seen in the Beyan temple). The east facing gopura, in particular, has well-preserved garuda images on its corners. Two hundred meters from the west entrance of this enclosure leads to a moat, which is decorated with statues of lions and naga-balustrades mounted on garudas. The moat itself has in its precincts the third enclosure which measures 320 m × 300 m (1,050 ft × 980 ft), also enclosed with laterite walls. The Buddha image at the entrance to the moat, near the second interior gate, is well preserved, considering the fact that most of the other statues have been destroyed or stolen.

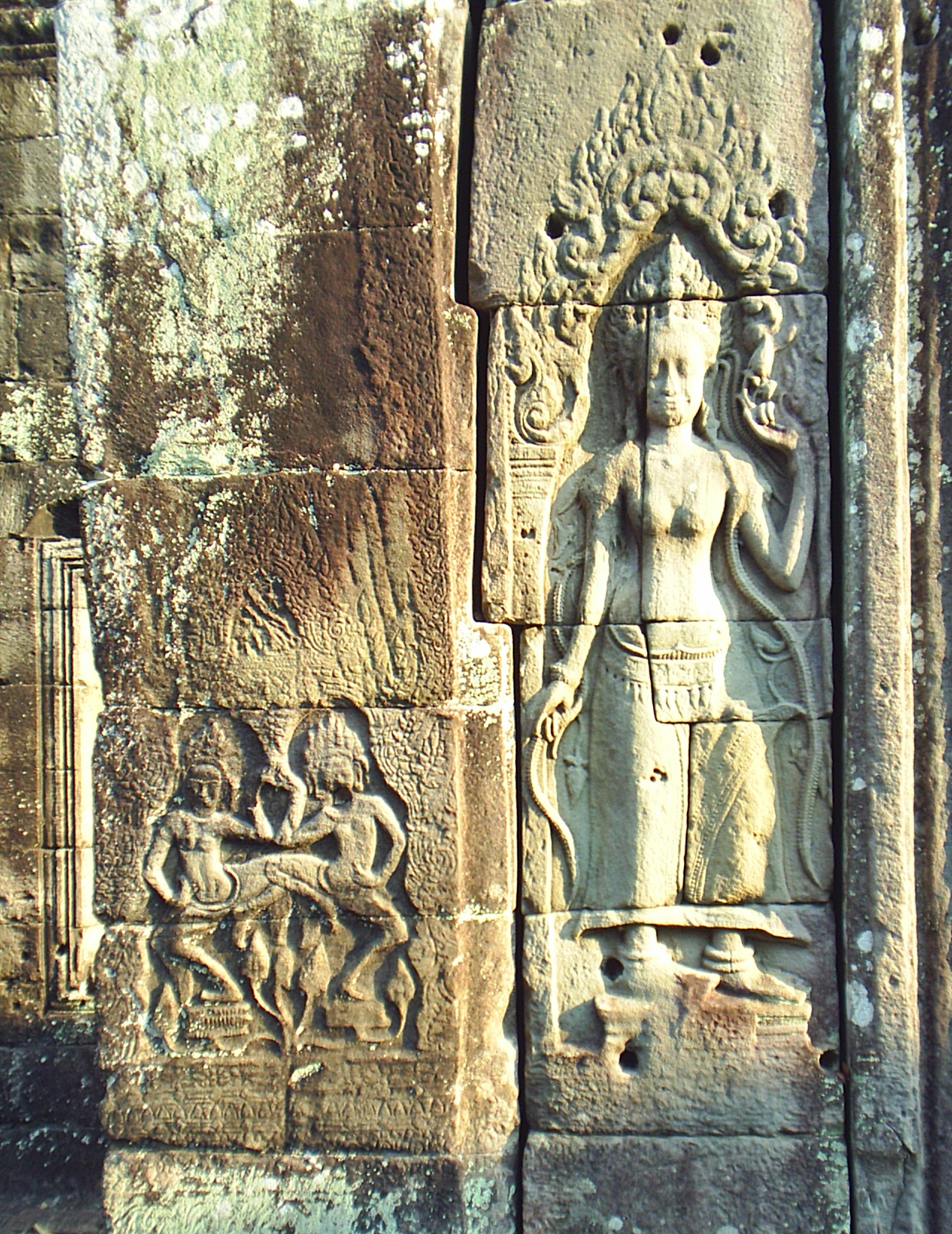
Carvings of Apsara Devata

Third enclosure

The third enclosure has a gopura which has a cruciform plan. It has pillars which are crossed by vaults. There are three passages in this enclosure, two on either side are independent, with laterite walls. The niches here have small figurines, and large apsara devatas in single poses or in pairs of dancing poses. Large Buddha images, in an internal courtyard of this enclosure, have been defaced by vandals. A paved access from here leads to the main shrine, which comprises two galleried enclosures. At the entrance to these enclosures, from the eastern end, is the "Hall of Dancers", which has four open courtyards and the pillars have fine carvings of apsaras.

Second enclosure

The second enclosure, which is part of the main temple, measures 58 m × 50 m (190 ft × 164 ft). It has a gopura on its eastern side and also subsidiary gopura on the west. Entrance doors are at the northern and southern ends. The gopura is built like a gallery with one exterior wall and double row of pillars which open into a courtyard and which has mostly shored up walls with small openings at the bottom to allow air circulation. The niches here are decorated with images of apsaras, and a Buddha statue in the central hall has been defaced by vandals. Bayon style architectural features built-in are the "balustered false windows with lowered blinds and devatas with headdresses in the form of small flaming discs set in a triangle." The vaults built in sandstone and laterite have collapsed at several locations of the gallery. The inner enclosures contain library building to its north and south and also a central sanctuary.

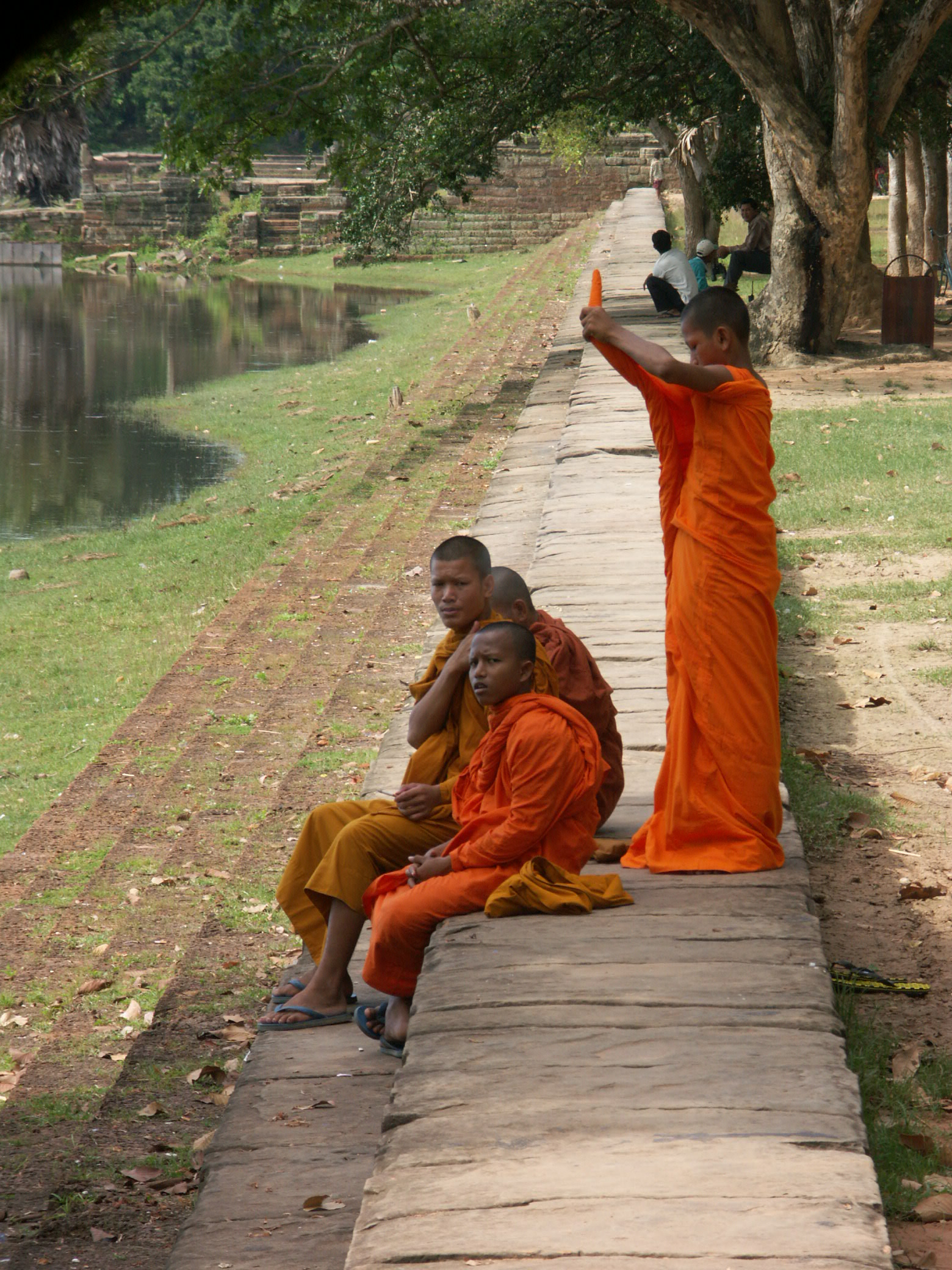
Srah Srang royal bathing pond for ritual bathing

Inner enclosure

The inner enclosure of the main temple is built on a 36 m × 30 m (118 ft × 98 ft) layout plan. This enclosure has four corner towers abutted by small gopuras. Galleries running along an axis link these towers to the main sanctuary. The towers at the north-east and south-east are linked with the second gallery where a Buddha statue in a sitting posture is seen, in the backdrop of an open sky line. The sanctum which is 2.75 m (9.0 ft) square enclosure has some traces of statues of deities. This entire enclosure, however, is not built in Bayon style and hence conjectured to be of an earlier period. Remnants of wooden ceiling are also seen here. The entrance to the sanctum is flanked by dvarapalas surrounded by apsaras.

Srah Srang

Srah Srang or "The royal bathing pool" or "pool of ablutions" to the east of Banteay Kdei, which was dug to dimensions of 700 metres (2,300 ft)x300 metres (980 ft) during the reign of Rajendraverman in the 10th century, was beautified by Jayavarman VII with well laid out steps of laterite stones with external margin of sandstone, on the banks of the pond facing the Sun. It is set amidst large trees and has turquoise blue waters all the year round. The approaching steps to the water edge are flanked by two stone statues of lions with ornamented Nāga-balustrades. The pond was reserved for use by the king and his wives. A stone base seen at an island in the centre of the pond once housed a wooden temple where the king did meditation. At the lily filled lake, watching sunset reflections in the lake is quite an experience. The water from the lake is now used for rice cultivation by farmers of the area.

== Architectural features ==
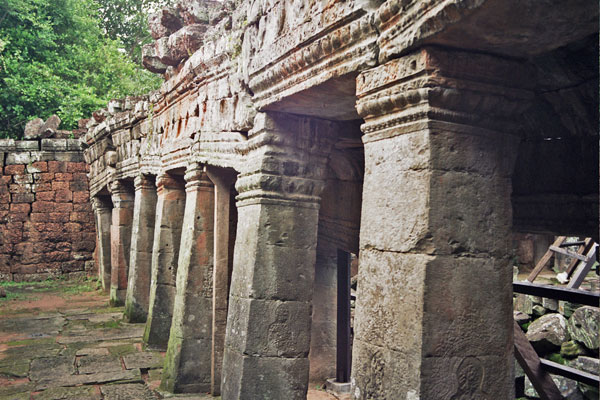
Large pillars supporting roof slabs

Some specific architectural features which evolved with the Bayon style are clearly discerned in this temple. The roof is supported on free-standing pillars in the eastern and western pavilions in the third enclosure, built in a cruciform plan with the inner row of pillars supporting the roof. The pillars are also tied to the wall by a tie beam using a "mortise–and–tenon join" patterned on wooden structures. Other features noted are of the four central pillars in the western pavilion which have been strengthened with temporary supports of laterite stone block pillars. Carvings of Buddha are seen on all these pillars but mostly defaced. The temporary support system provided to the roof built on free standing pillars is indicative of problems of design seen in the temples built during this period.

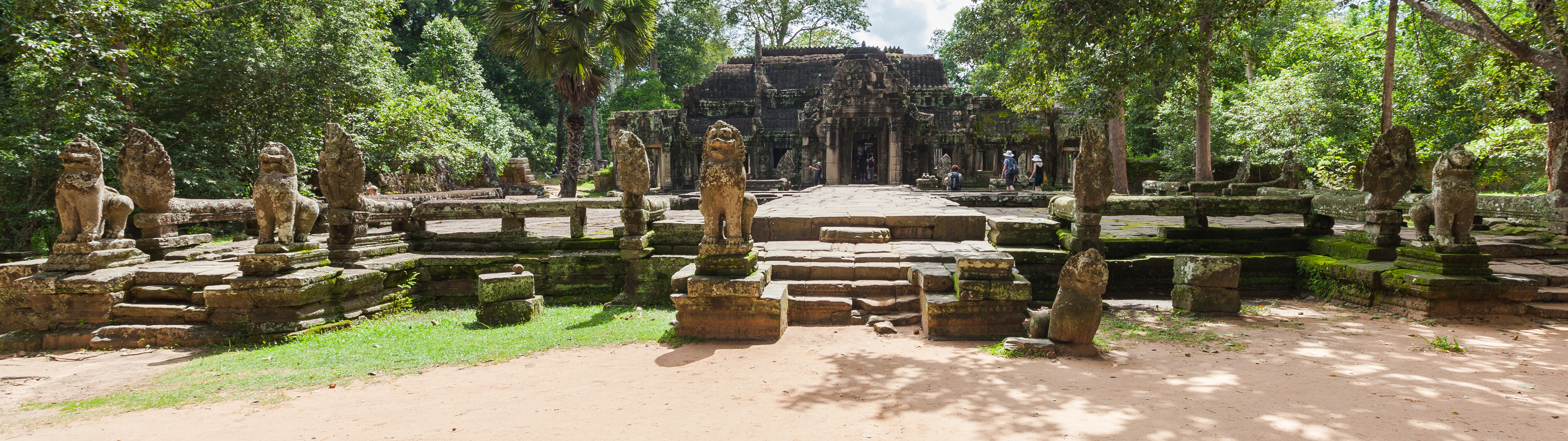
Banteay Kdei, a wide view

== Restoration ==
Laser scans and imaging of the Banteay Kdei and Angkor Wat Western Causeway were performed within a project launched in March 2004 by the University of California and Sophia University of Tokyo, in partnership with the nonprofit CyArk. The obtained information has facilitated restoration and reconstruction of these structures, which is funded by the Sophia University, and much publicly accessible data from the project is hosted on the CyArk Website. The APSARA Authority has achieved significant improvements in conservation and preservation of monuments in Angkor. Some of the towers and corridors are under restoration and as a result some locations have been cordoned off. Strengthening measures are seen in some parts of the interior temple area where structures in danger are tied together with cables.

== Gallery ==
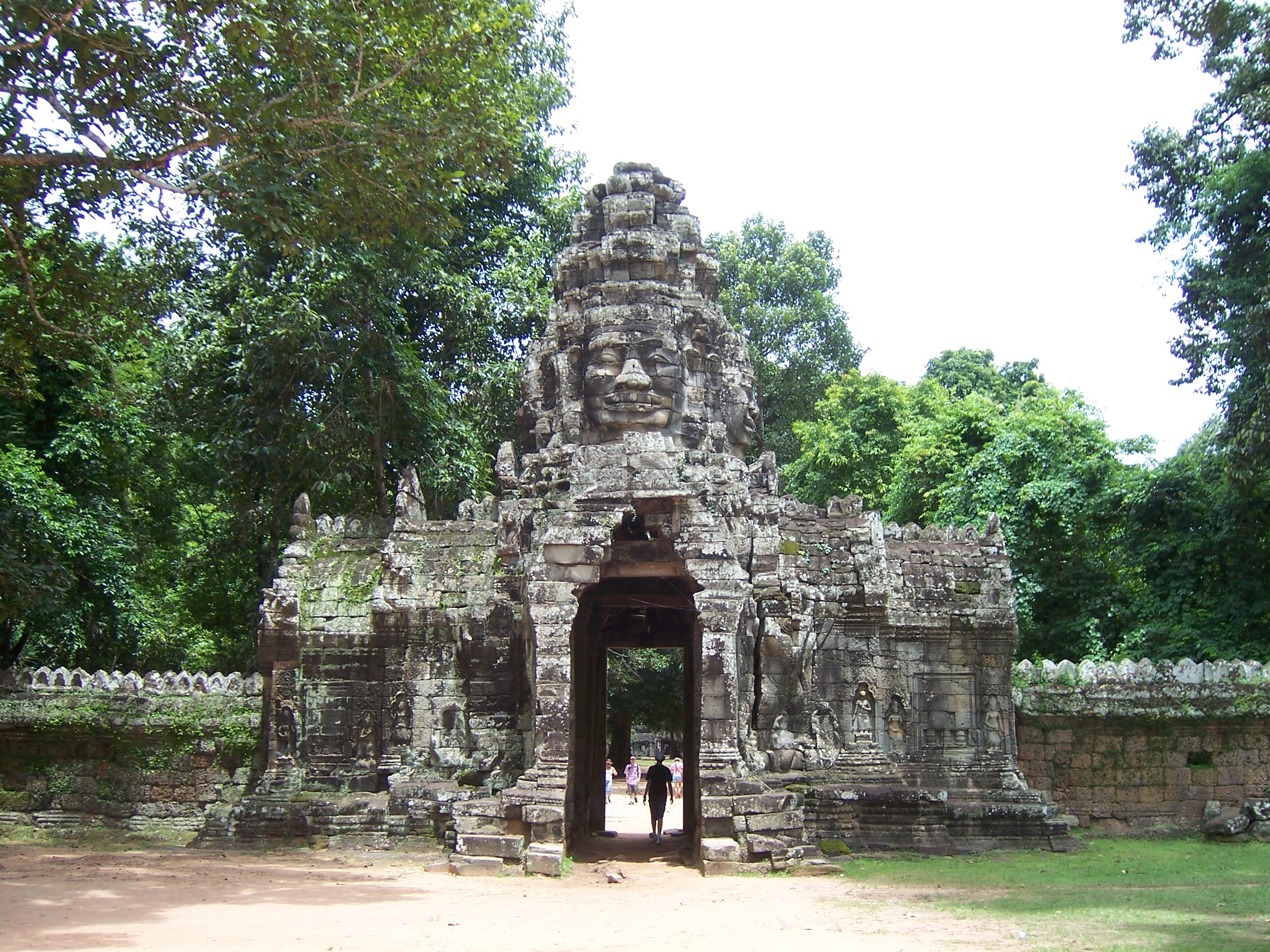

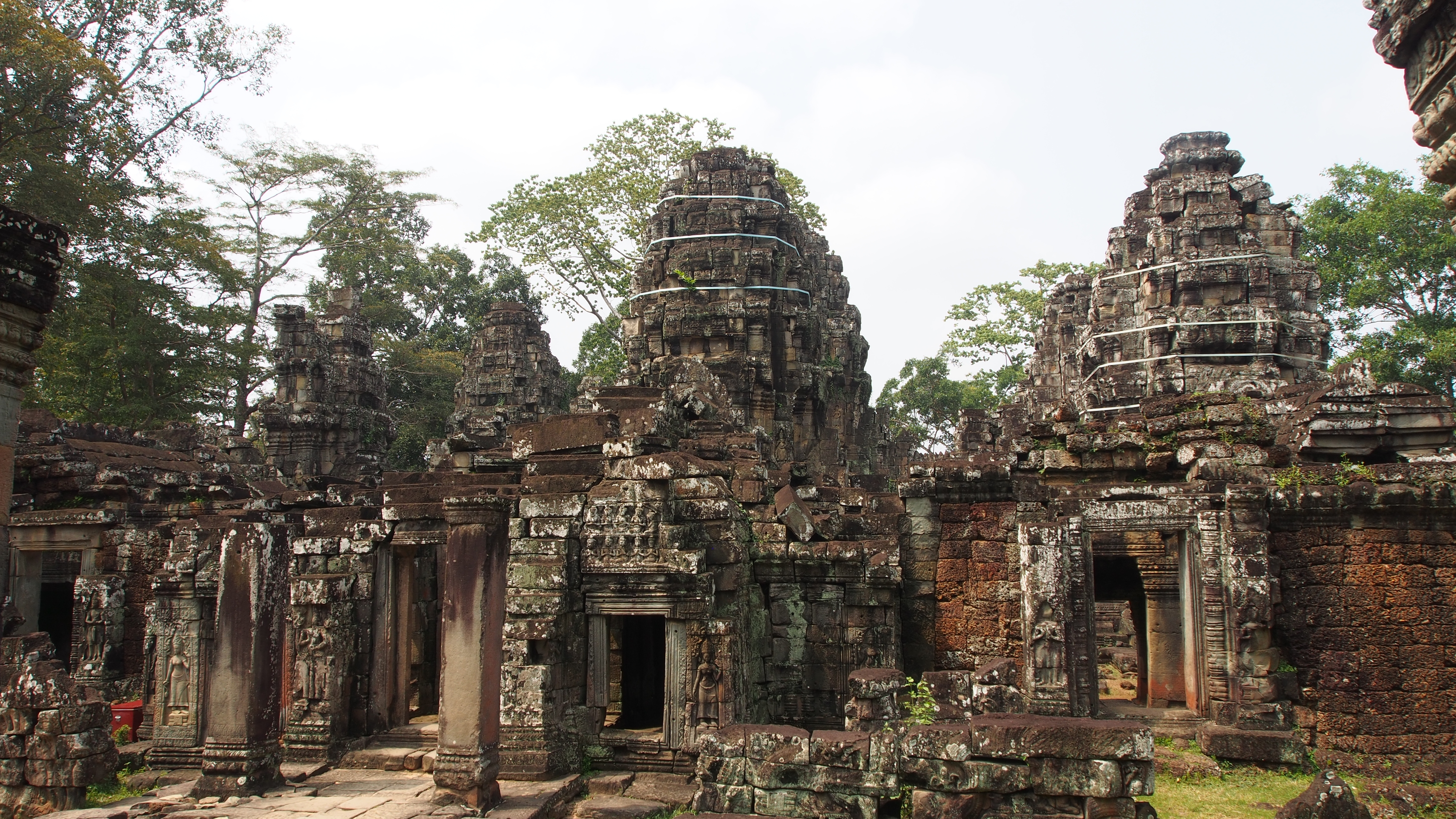

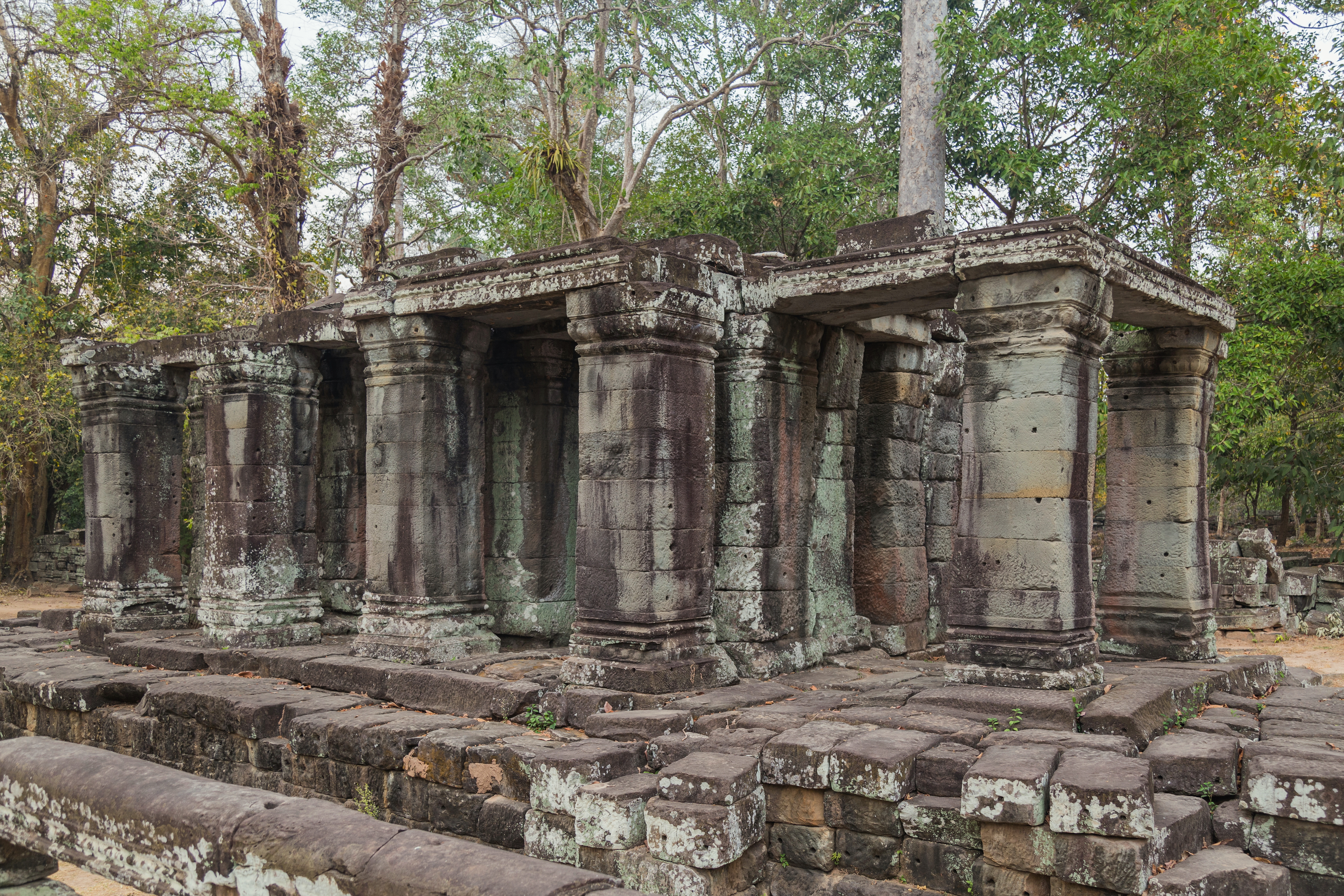

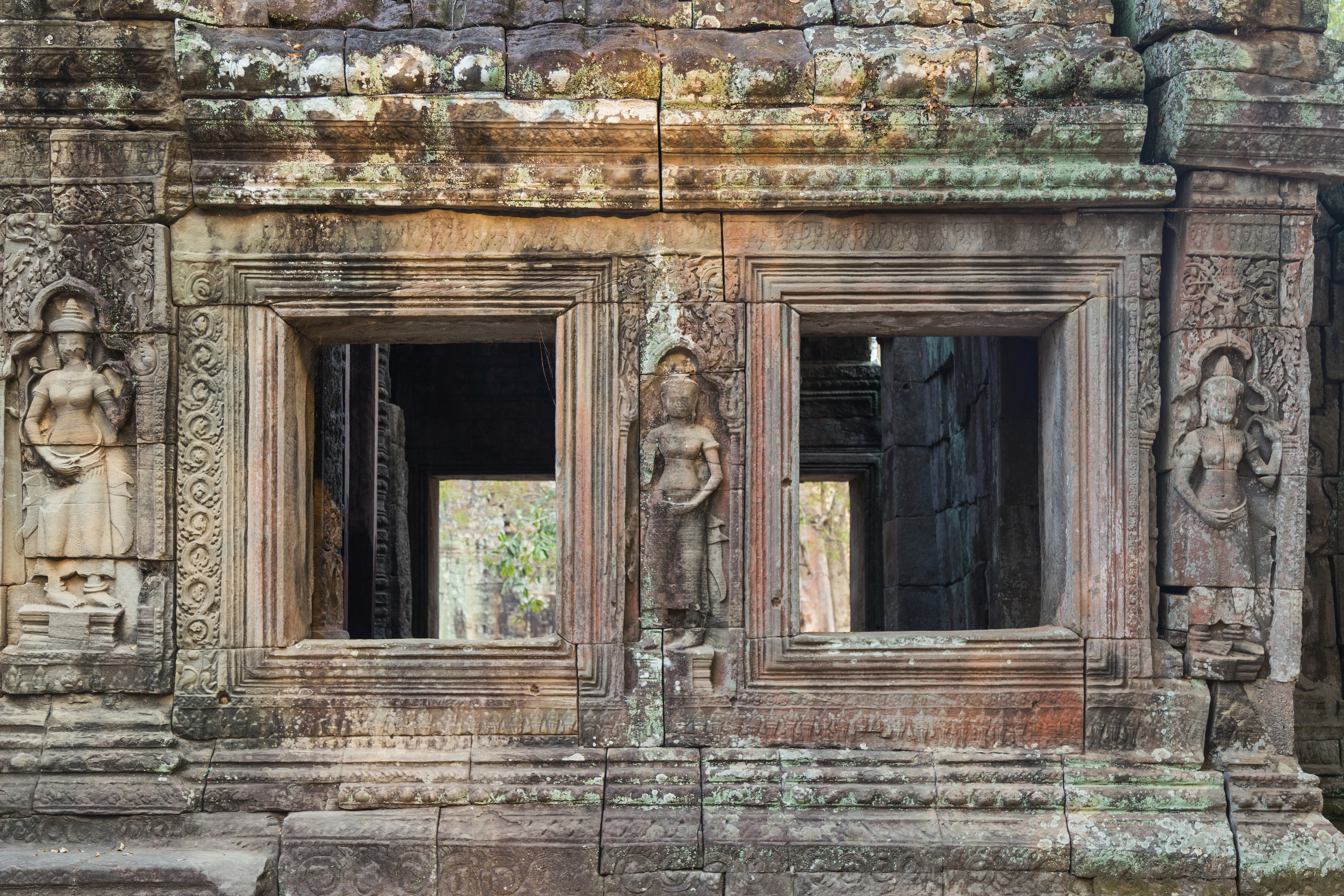

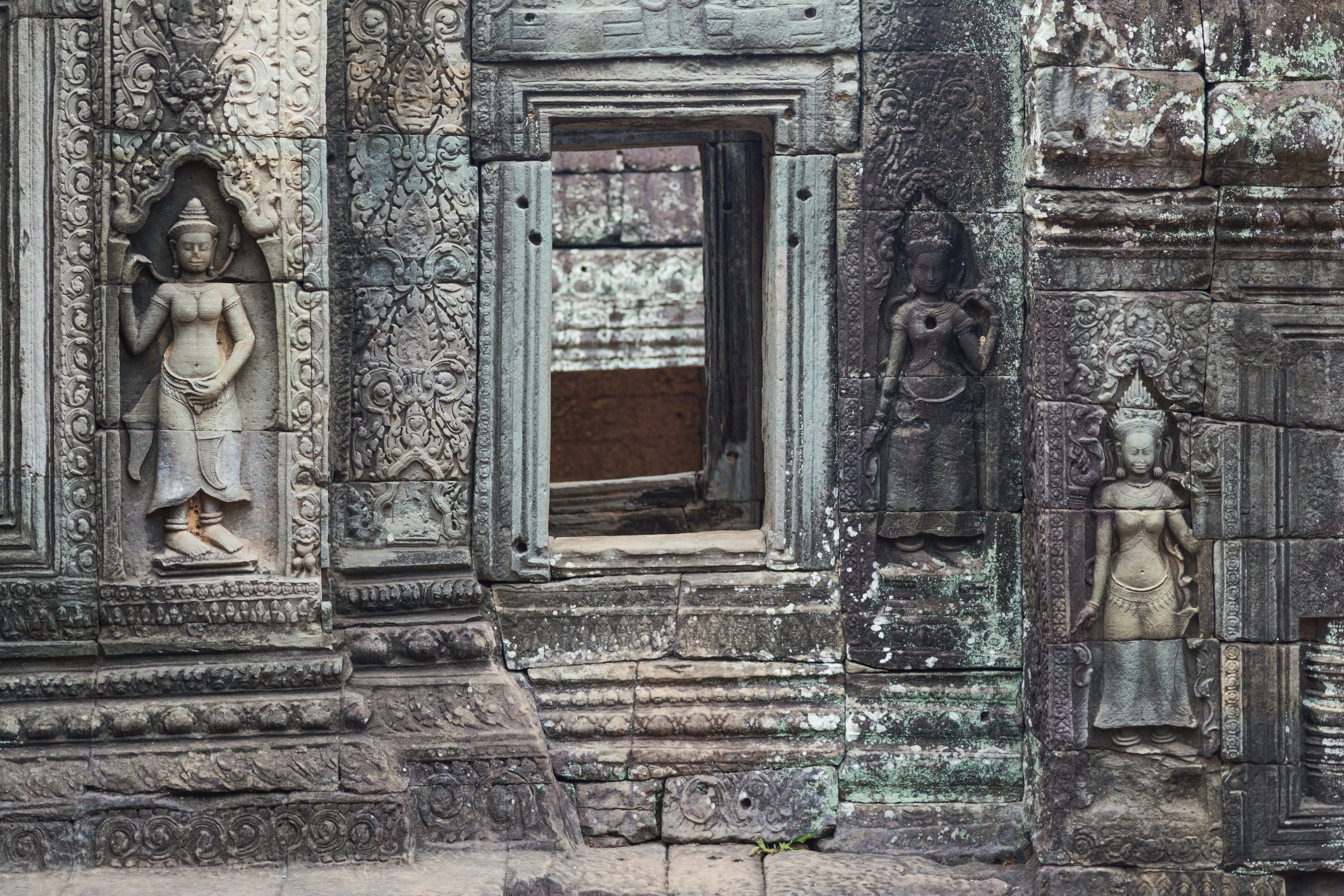

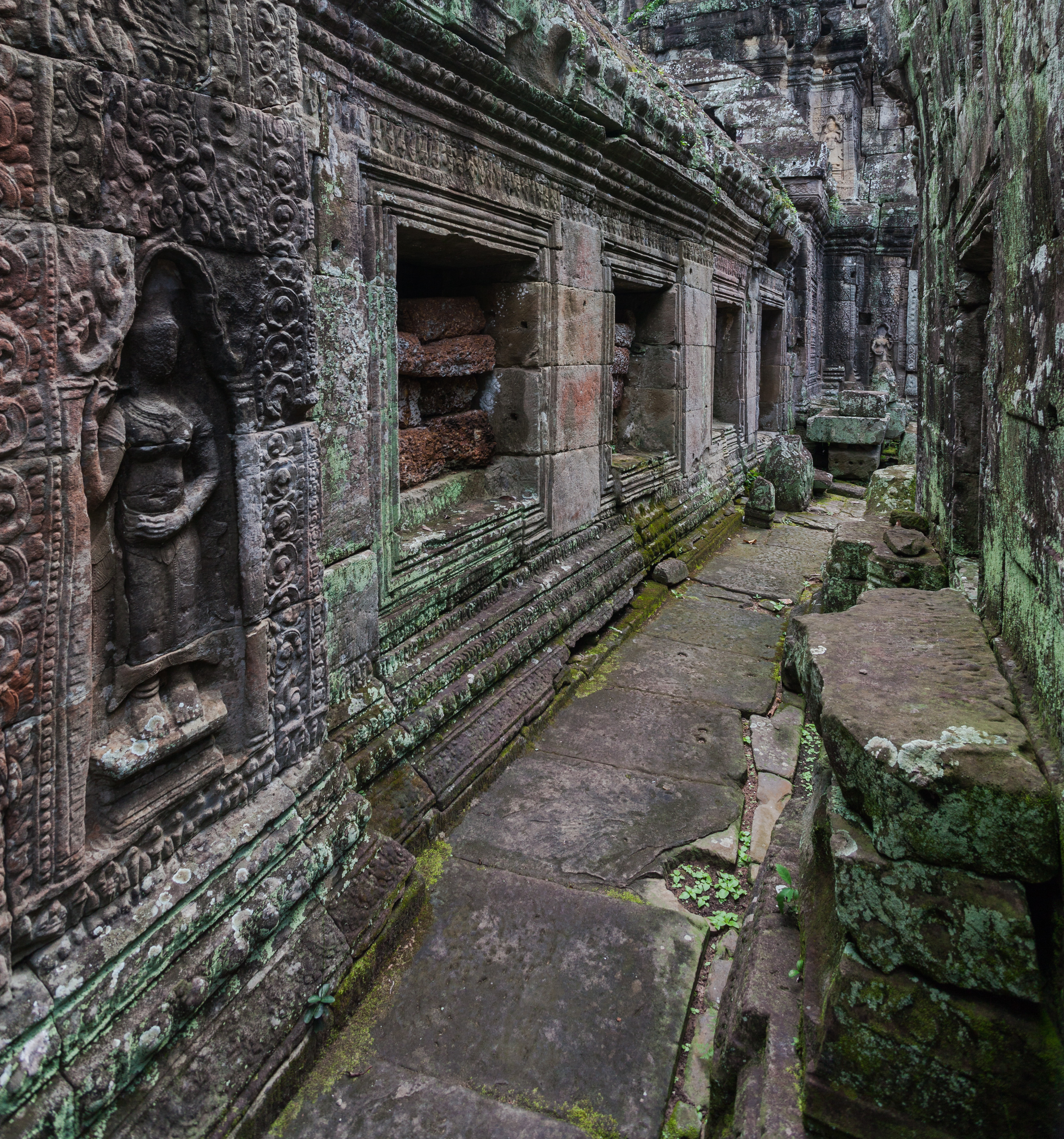

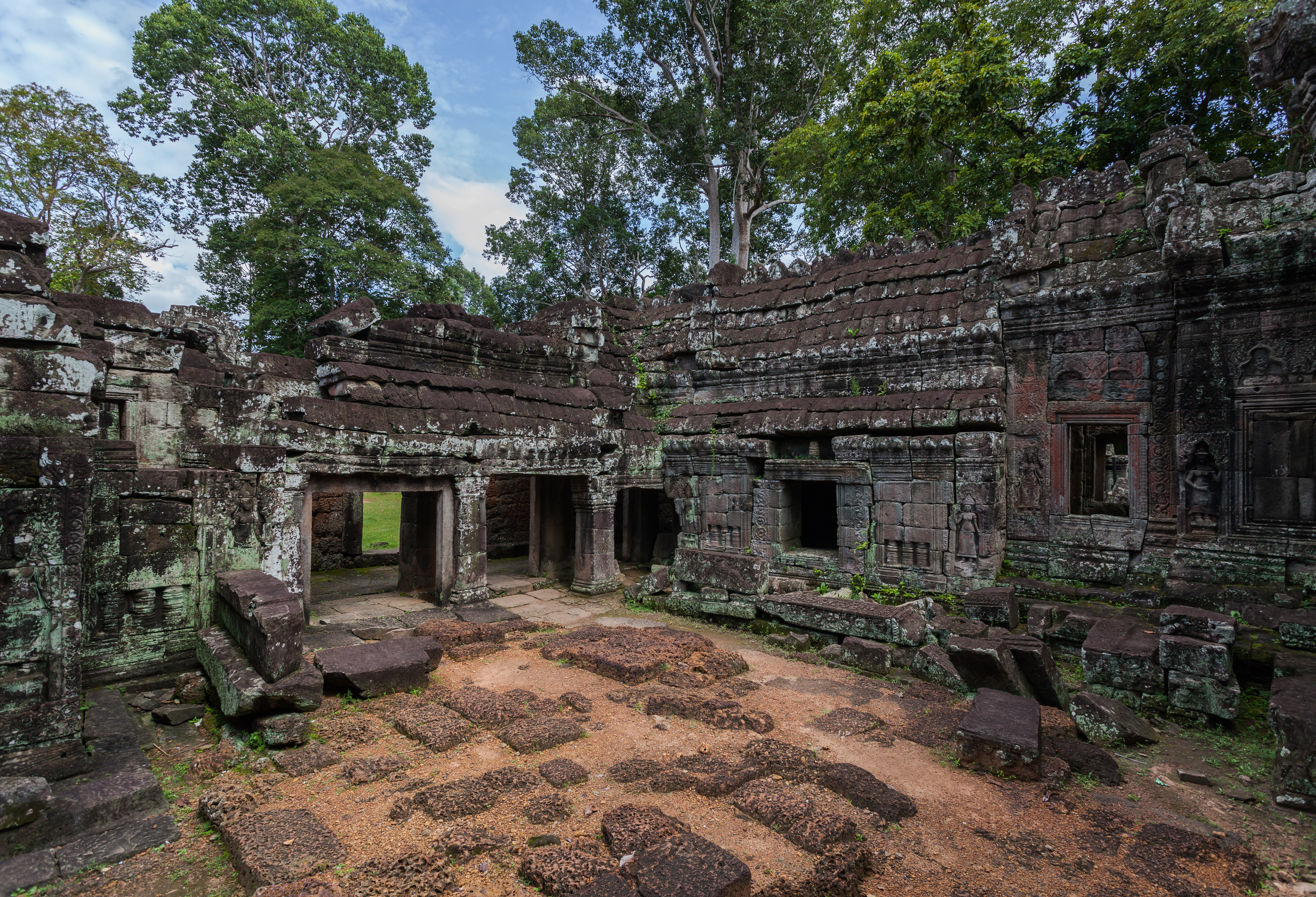

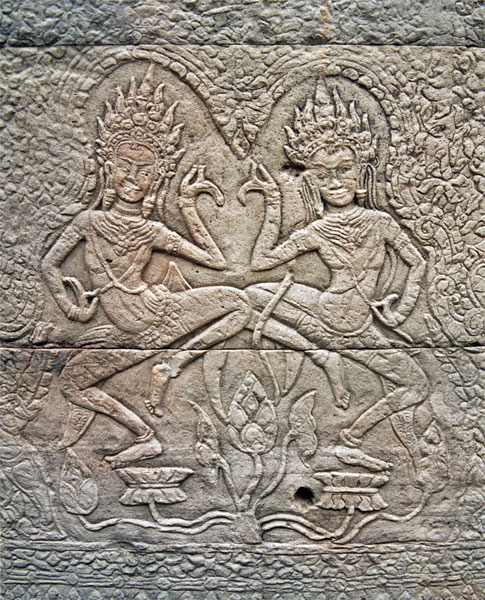

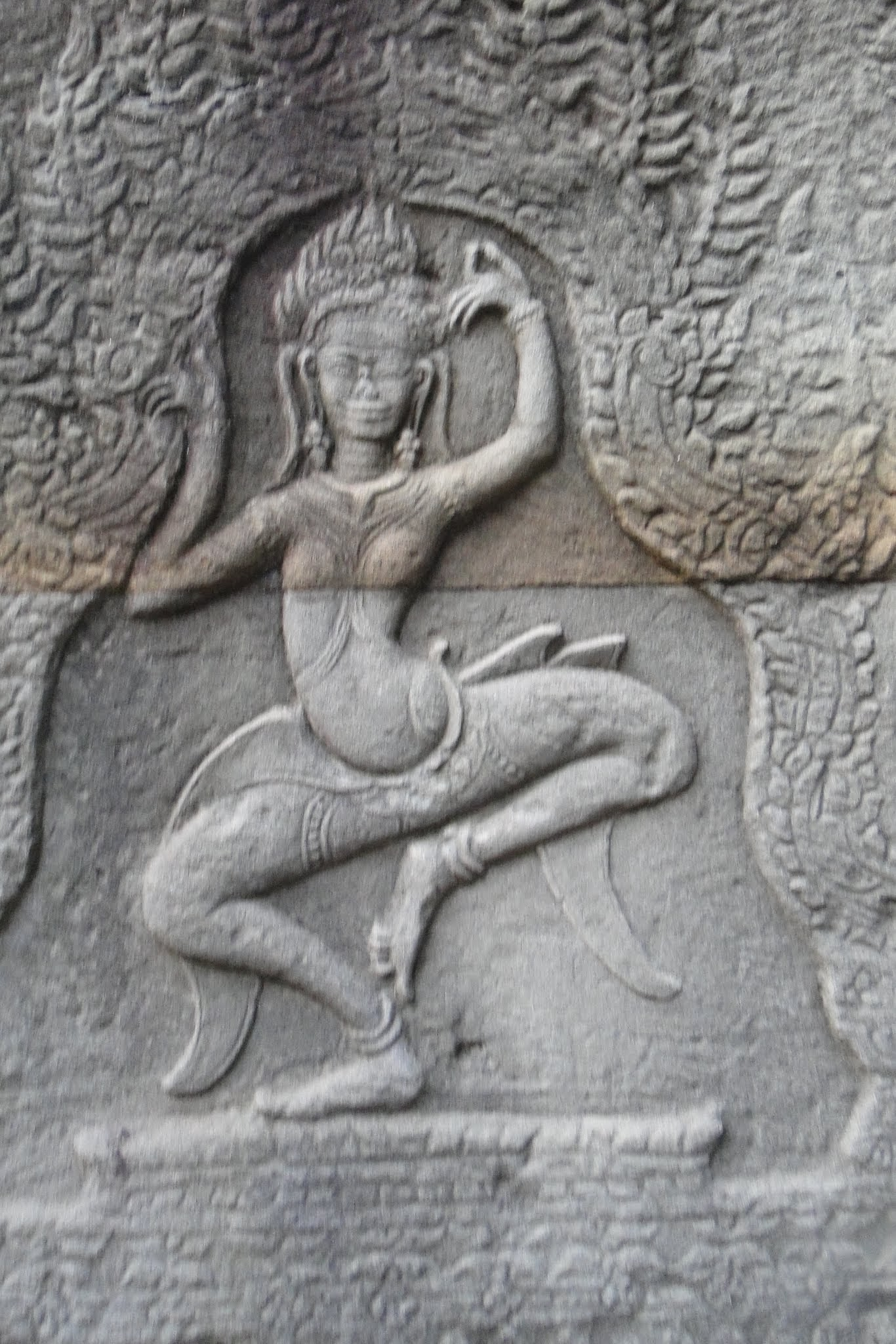

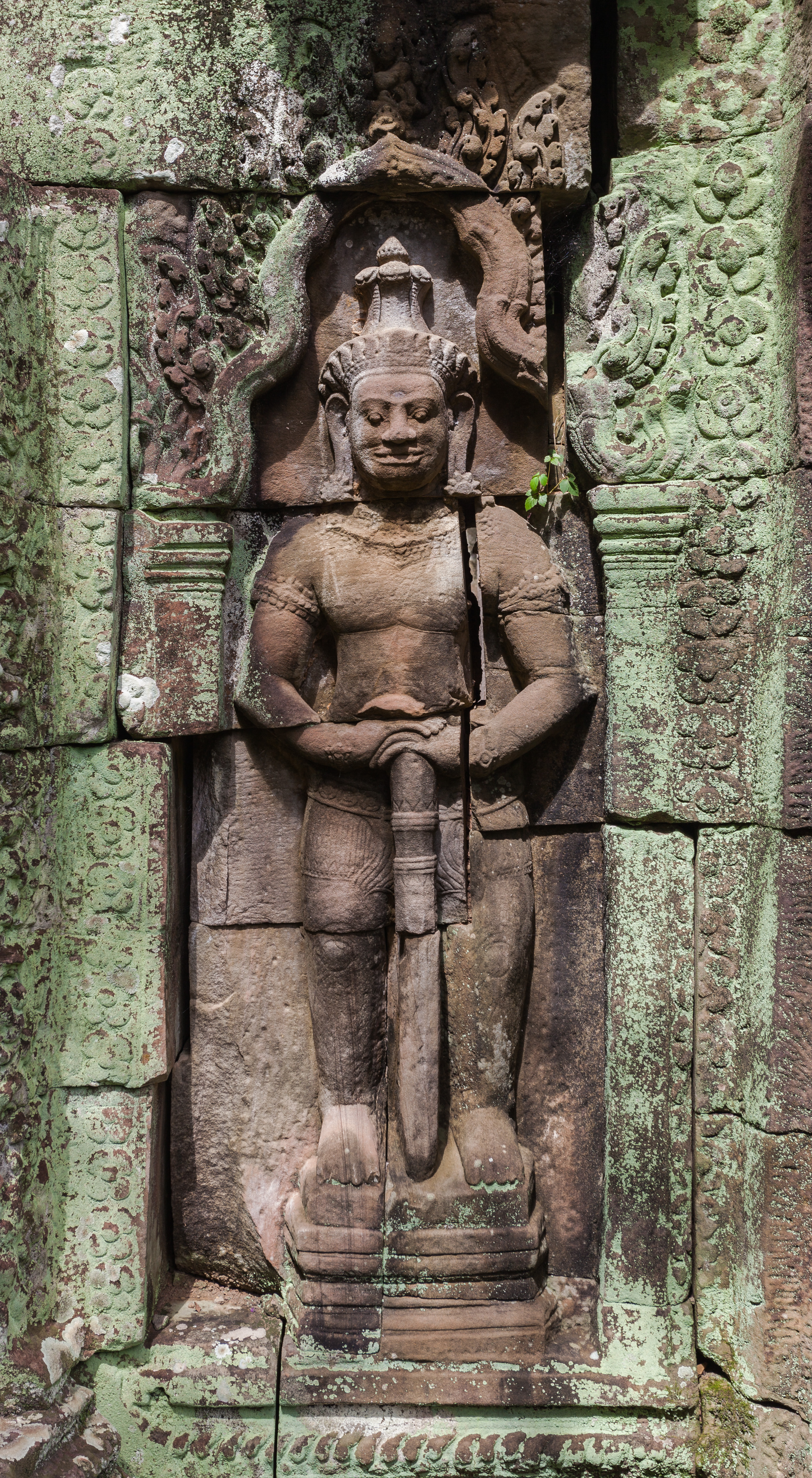

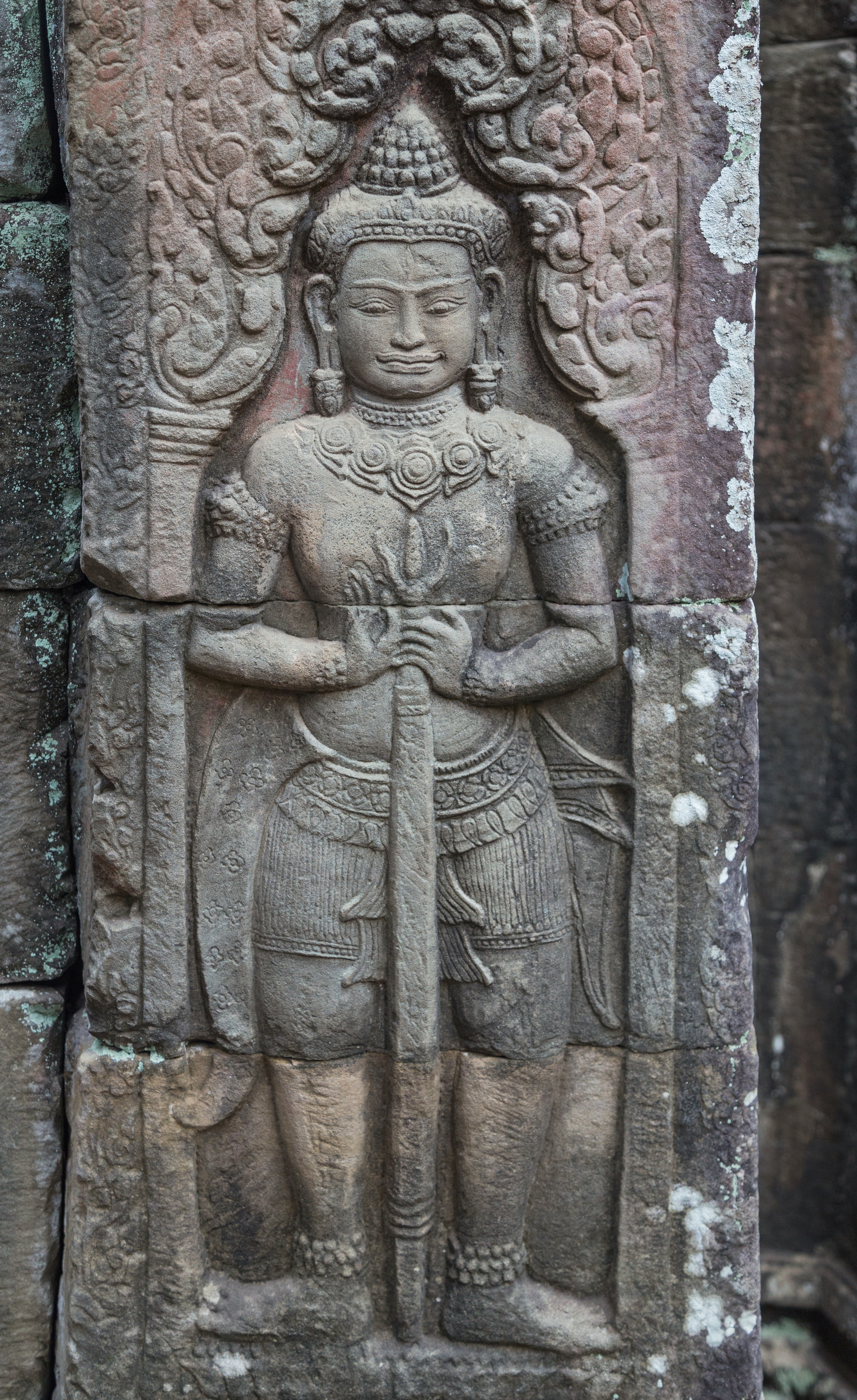

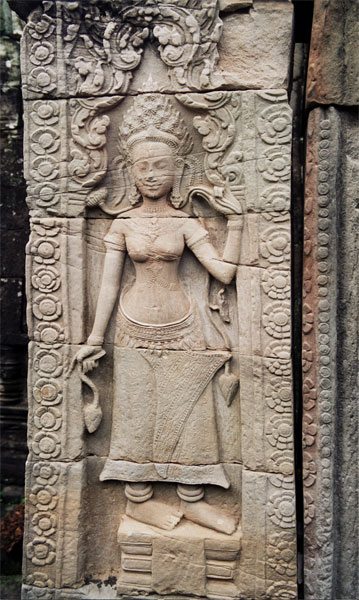

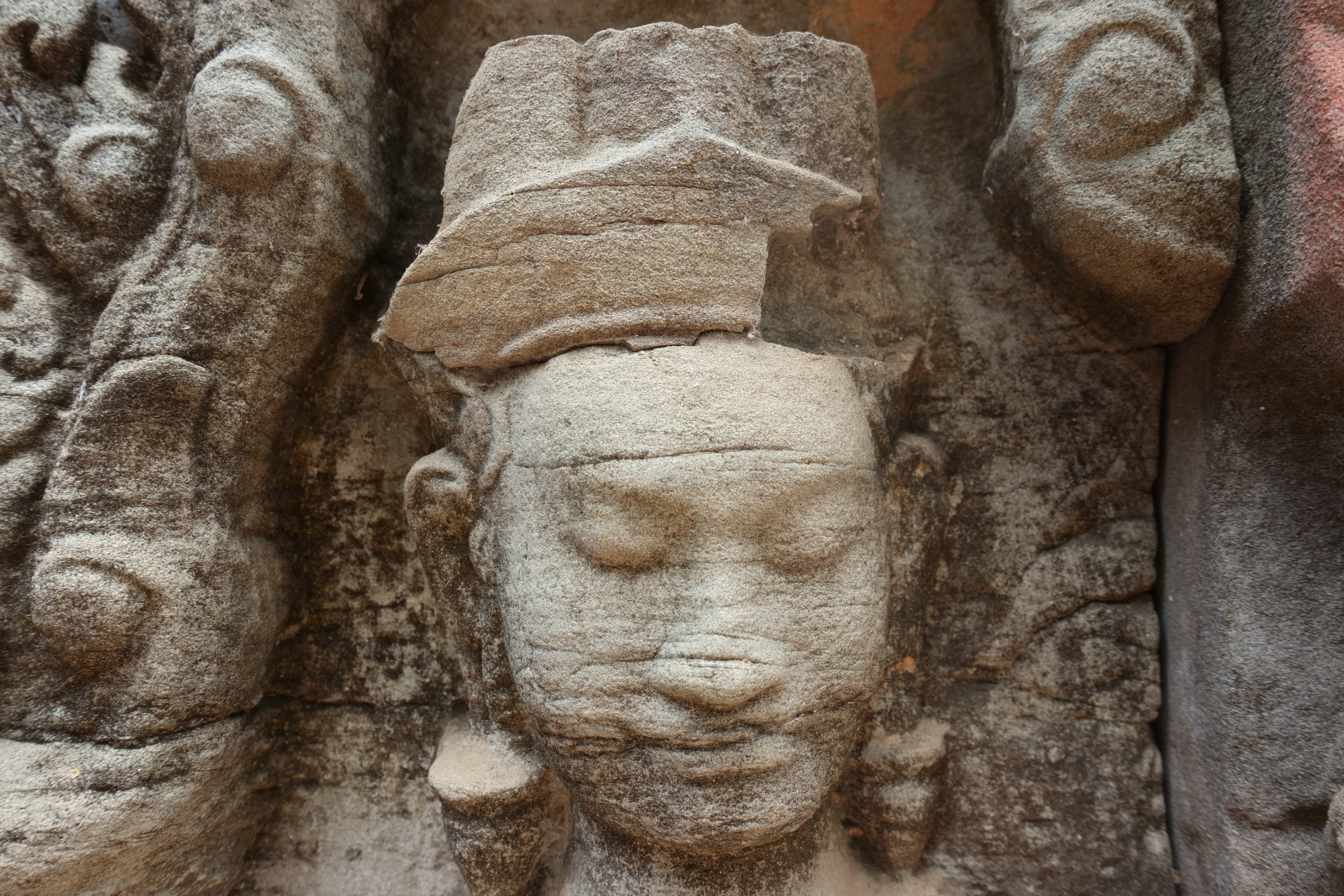

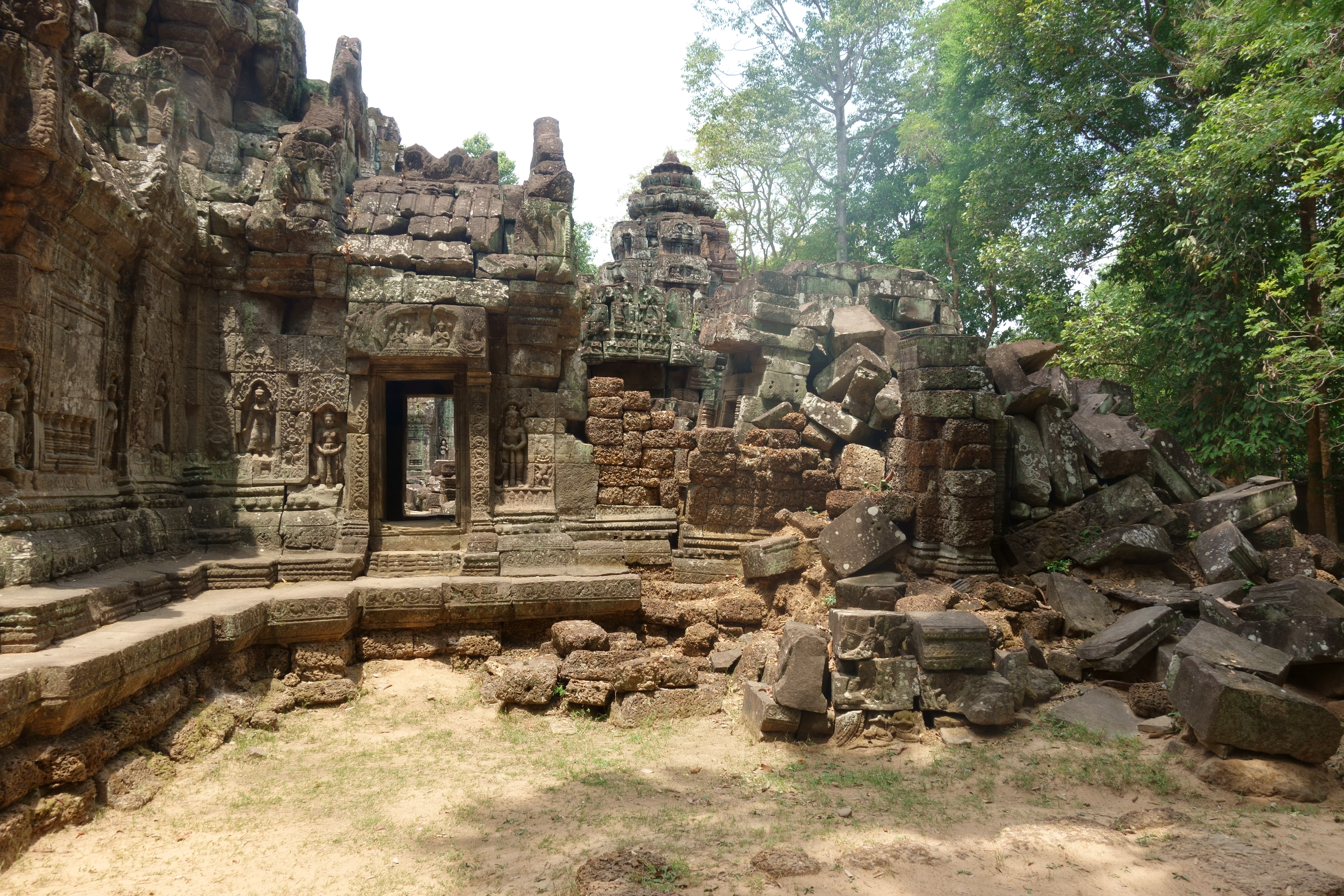

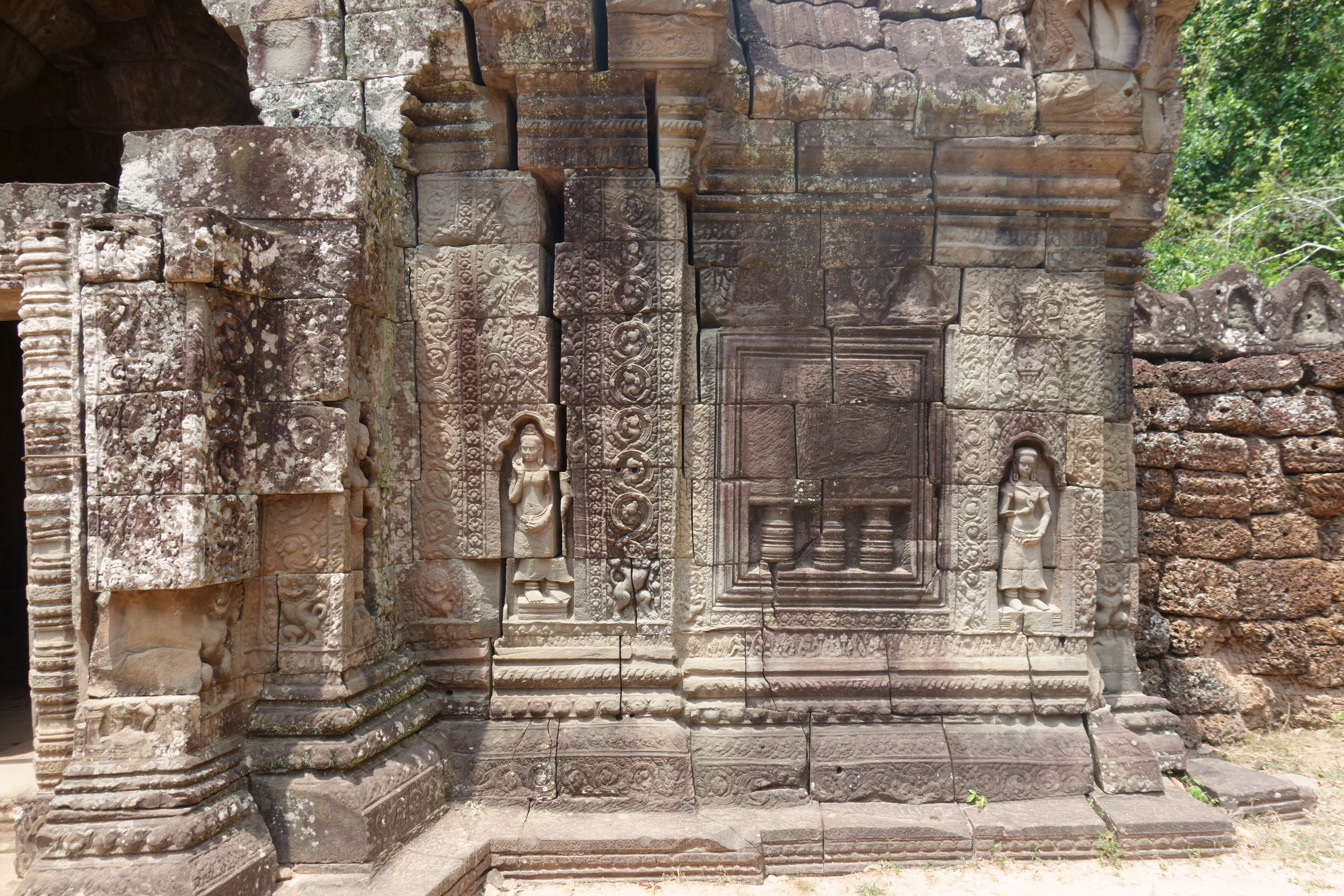

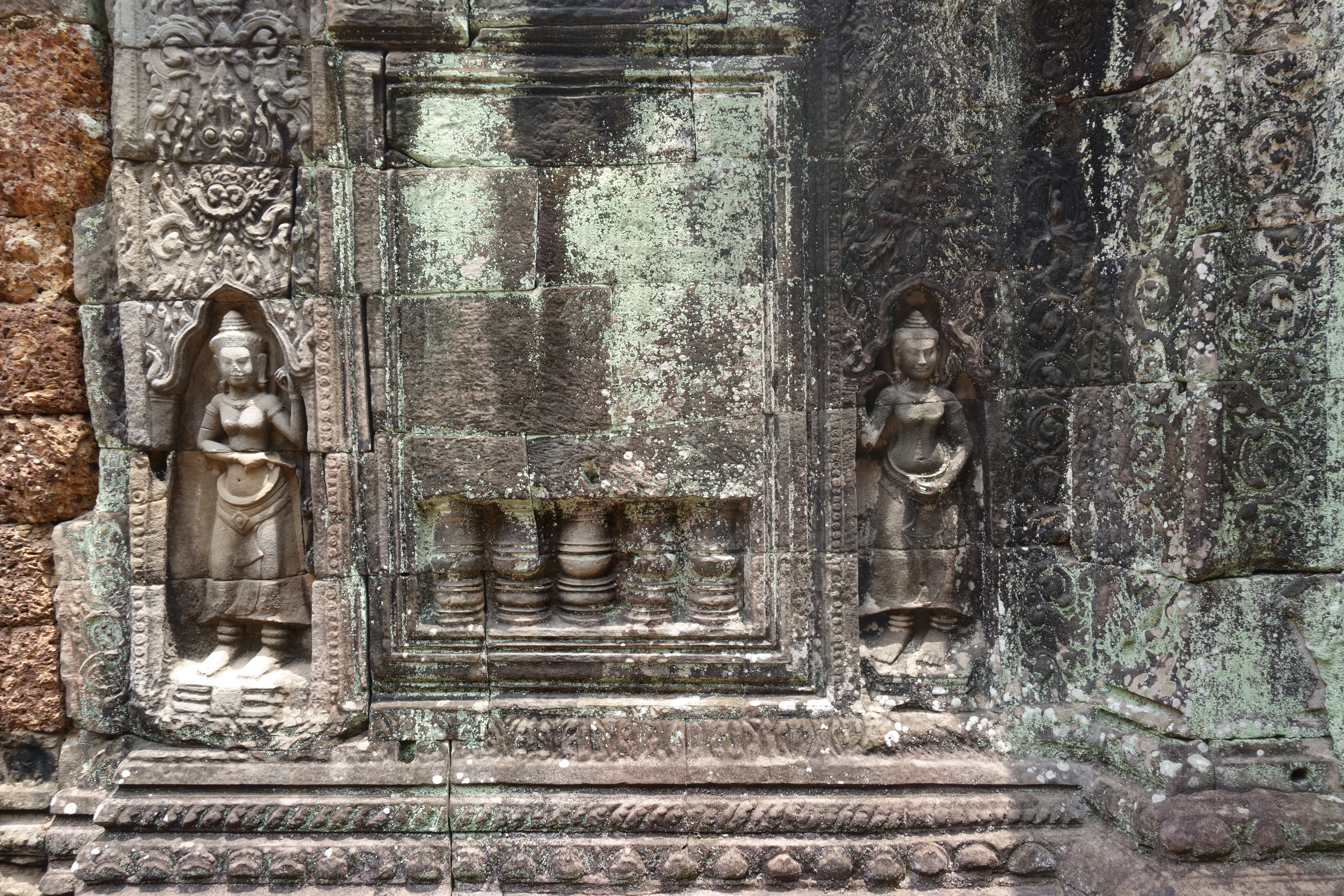

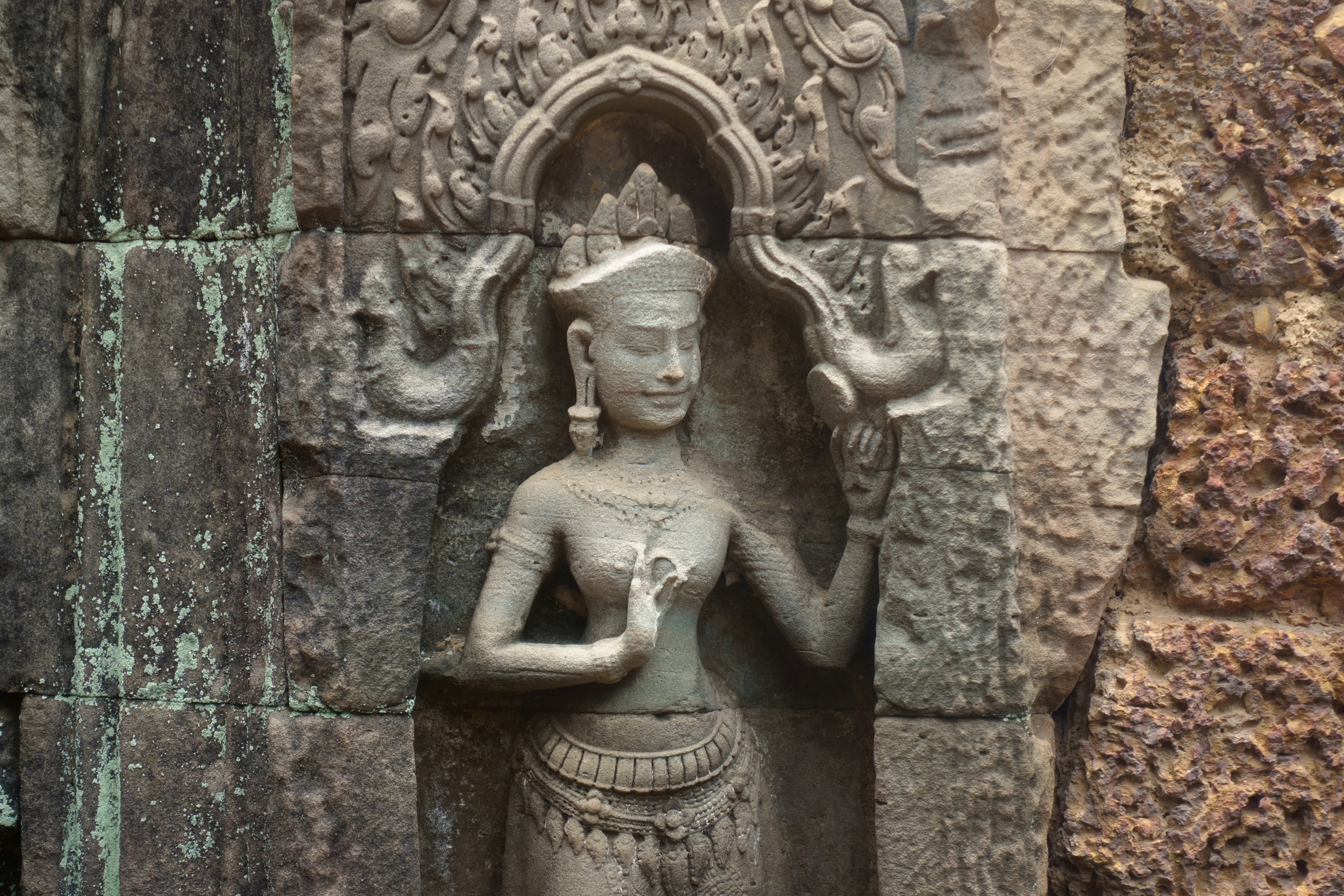

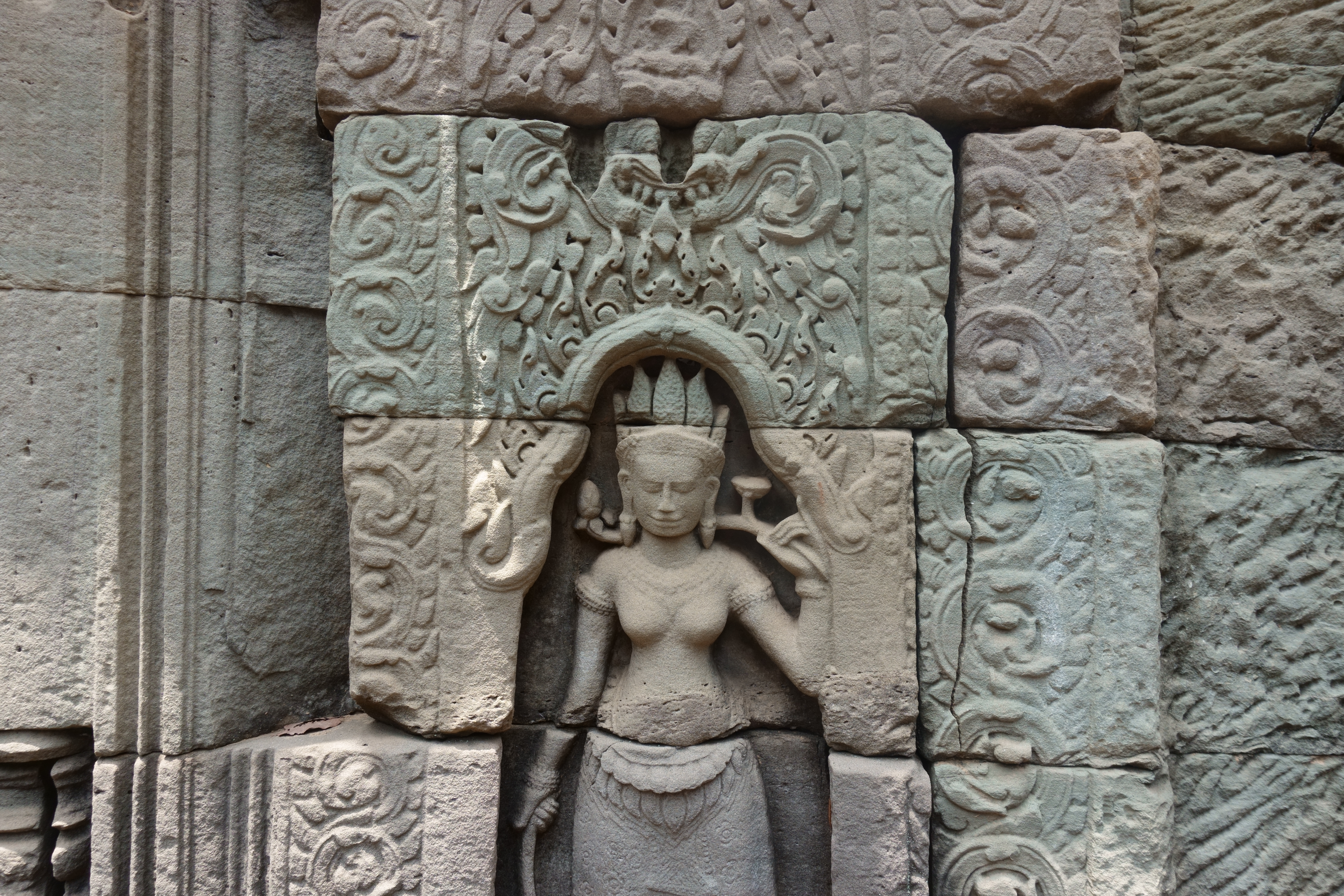
