= Srah Srang =

Baray or reservoir at Angkor, Cambodia

Coordinates: 13°25′51.60″N 103°54′24.15″E

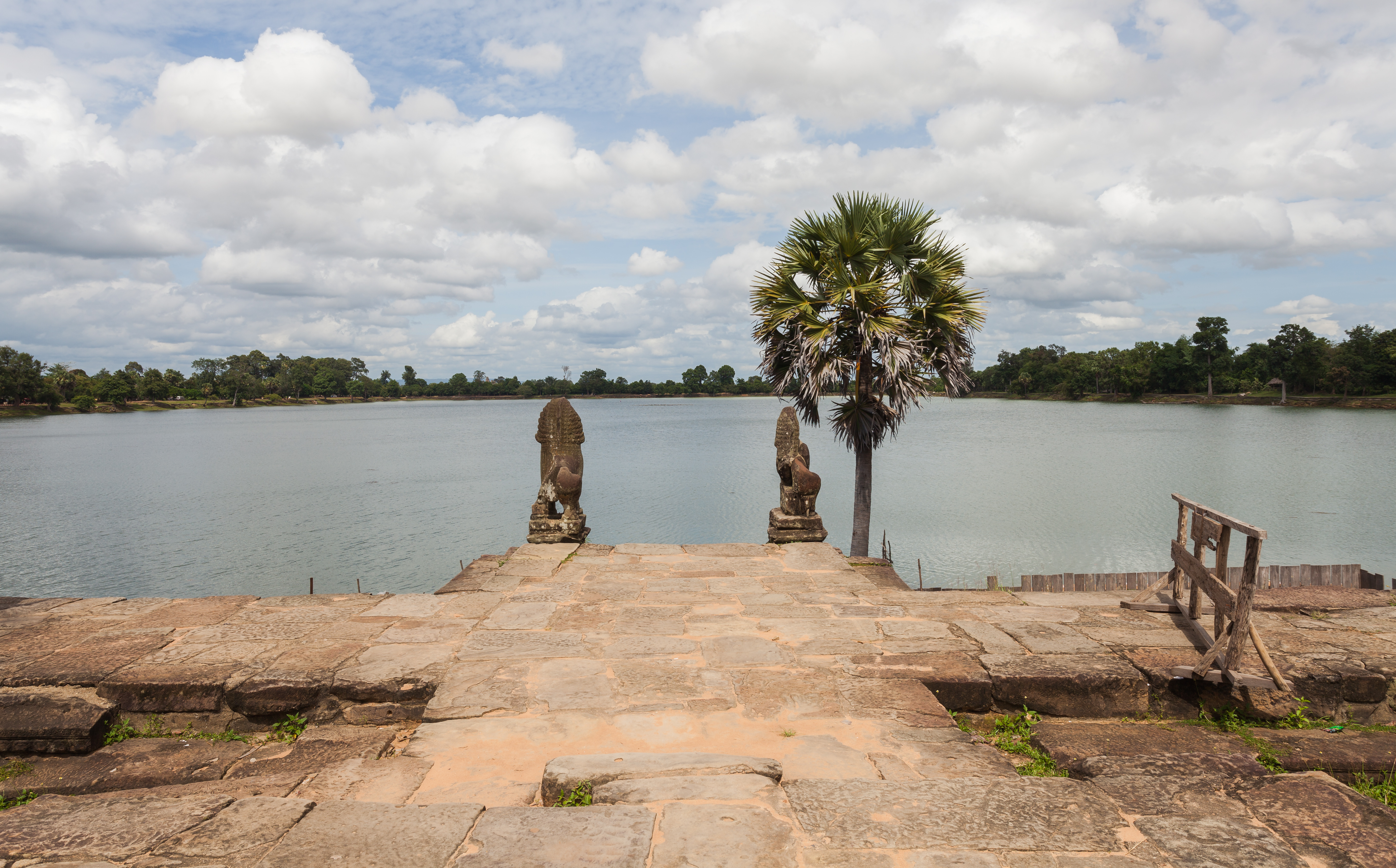
The Srah Srang from the west platform.

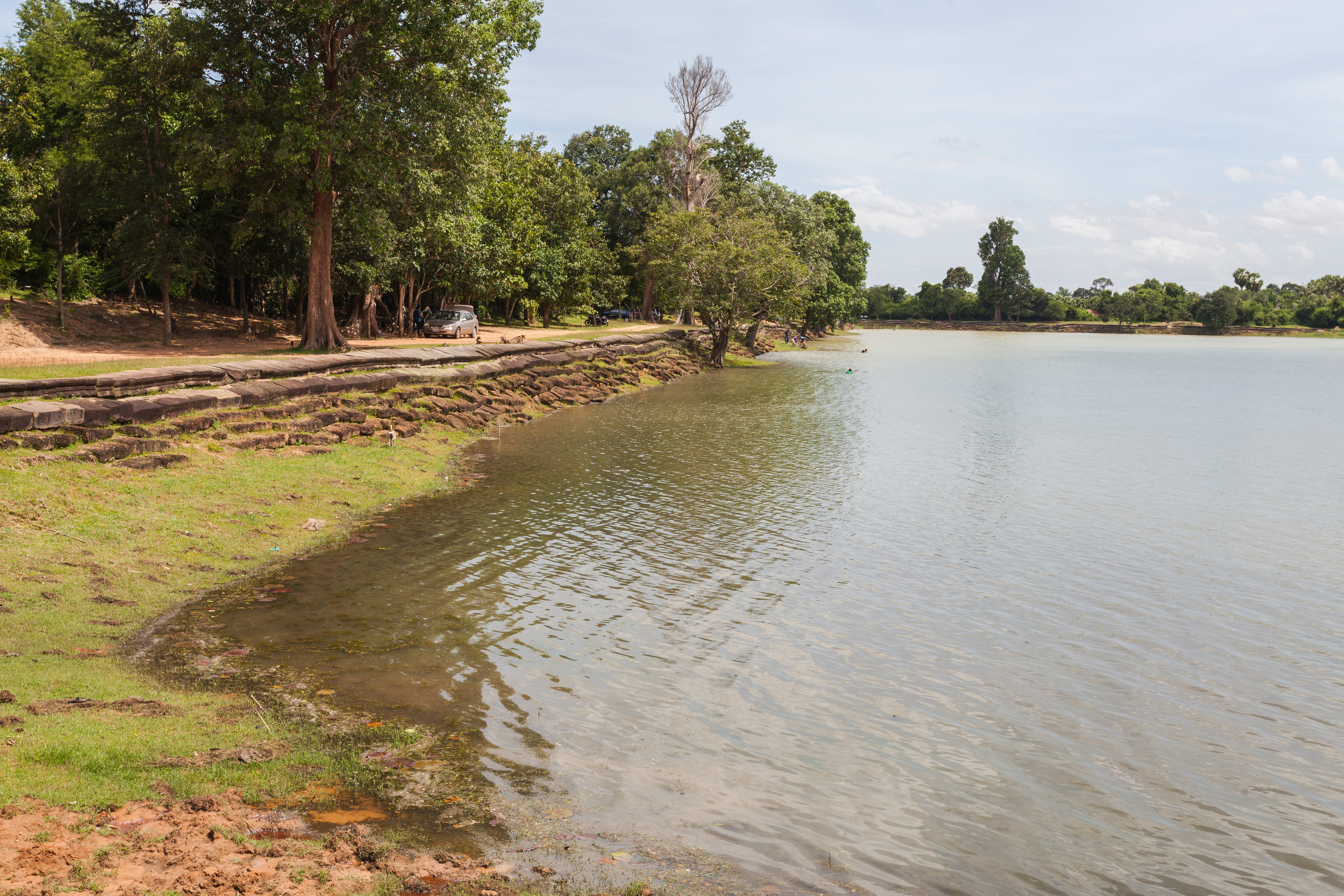
Stone covered quay

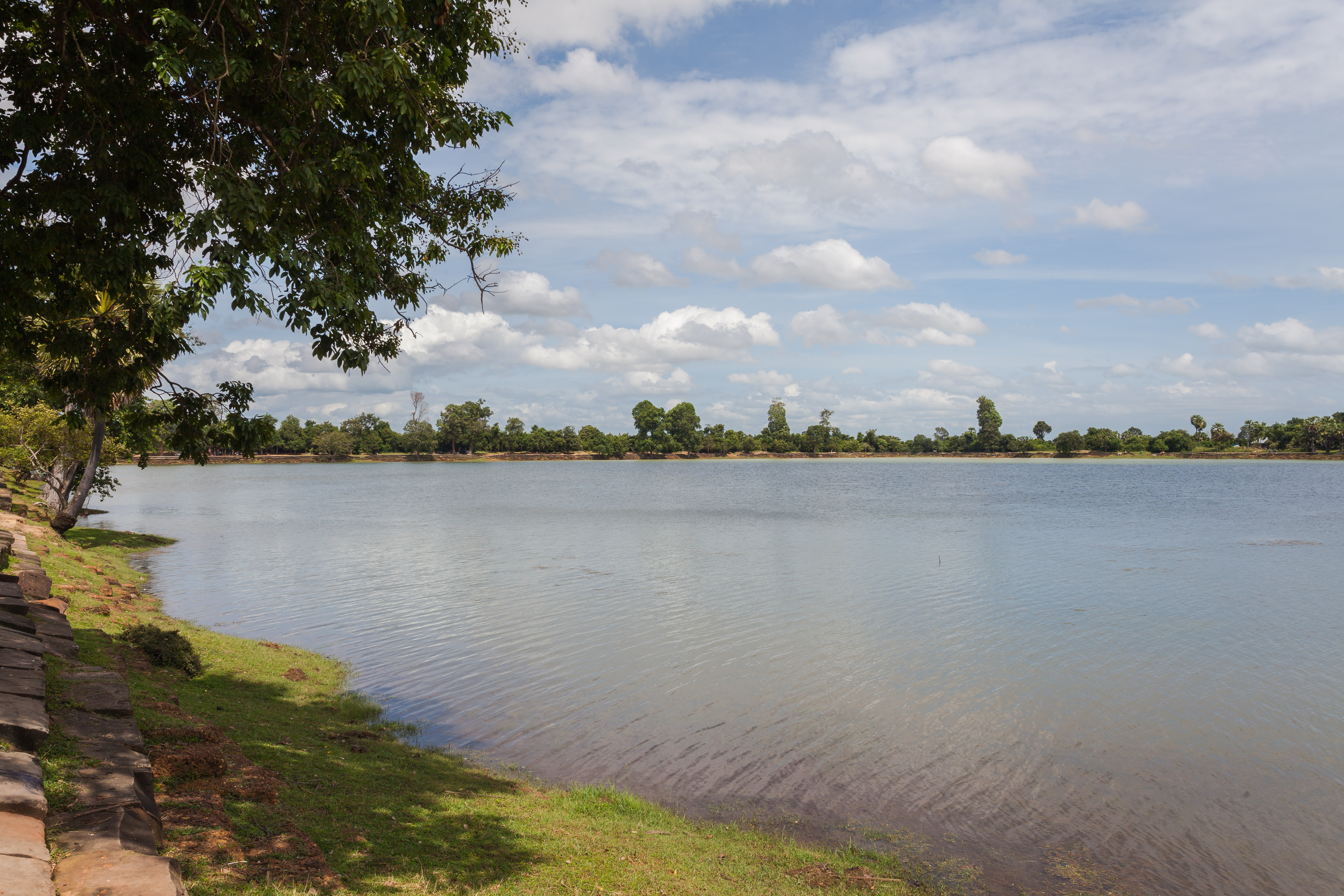
Srah Srang

Srah Srang (Khmer: ស្រះស្រង់, "Royal Bath") is a baray or reservoir at Angkor, Cambodia, located south of the East Baray and east of Banteay Kdei.

== History ==
Sras Srang was dug in the mid-10th century, by initiative of Kavindrarimathana, Buddhist minister of Rajendravarman II. It was modified around the year 1200 by Jayavarman VII, who added the laterite landing-stage at its western side, probably because the East Baray had been overwhelmed by sediment and had begun malfunctioning.

French archeological expeditions have found a necropolis close to it.

== The site ==
At present Srah Srang measures 700 by 350 m and is still partially flooded. As other barays, maybe there was a temple standing on an artificial island in the middle of it, as suggested by finding of a basement. The landing-stage, opposite the entrance to Banteay Kdei, is a popular site for viewing the sunrise. It is cruciform, flanked by nāga balustrades which end with the upright head of a serpent, mounted by a garuda with its wings unfurled. The steps that lead down to the water are flanked by two guardian lions.

A 1600 sq. meter cemetery was discovered at the north-west corner of the reservoir. Mortuary jars containing cremated remains and other artifacts dating from the reign of Udayadityavarman II were excavated by B.P. Groslier.
