= Indochina refugee crisis =

Outflow of 3 million refugees from communism in the late 20th century

A map of French Indochina. North and South Vietnam were divided north of the city of Hue and had different governments from 1954 until 1976 when the country was formally re-united.

The Indochina refugee crisis was the large outflow of people from the former French colonies of Indochina, comprising the countries of Vietnam, Cambodia, and Laos, after communist governments were established in 1975. Over the next 25 years and out of a total Indochinese population in 1975 of 56 million, more than 3 million people would undertake the dangerous journey to become refugees in other countries of Southeast Asia, Hong Kong, or China.

The Indochinese refugees consisted of a number of different peoples, including the Vietnamese, Cambodians, Overseas Chinese (including Hoa and Chen), ethnic Lao, Hmong, Iu Mien, other highland peoples of Laos, and Montagnard, the highland peoples of Vietnam. They fled to nearby countries to seek temporary asylum and most requested permanent resettlement in third countries. More than 2.5 million Indochinese were resettled, mostly in North America, Australia, and Europe. More than 525,000 were repatriated, either voluntarily or involuntarily, mainly from Cambodia.

The refugee outflow and humanitarian crisis was especially acute in 1979 and 1980, when large numbers of Indochinese refugees died. Reverberations of the refugee crisis continued into the 21st century.

== Fall of Saigon (1975) ==
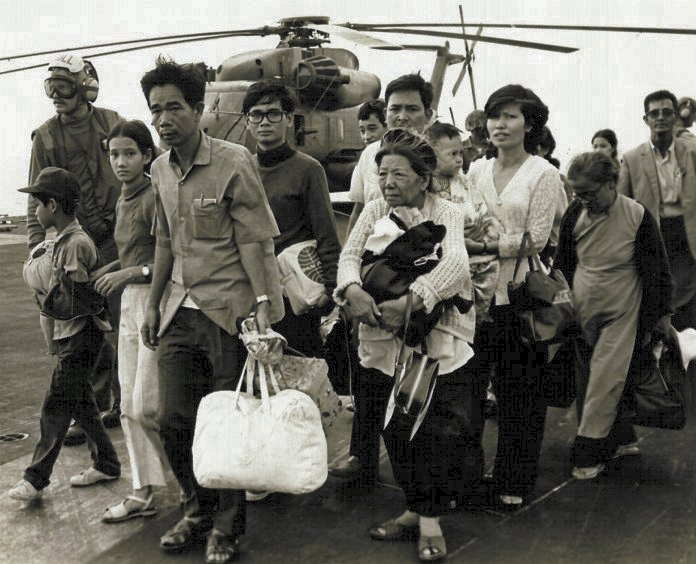
South Vietnamese refugees arrive on a U.S. Navy vessel during Operation Frequent Wind.

In spring 1975, the armies of North Vietnam and the Viet Cong advanced rapidly southward and by early April the defeat and occupation of South Vietnam by the north was nearly certain. During the Vietnam War, nearly one million Vietnamese had been employed by the U.S. government or were family members of former employees and were believed to be in danger of persecution or execution by the conquering North Vietnamese.

Fearing that rumors of evacuation would cause panic in the South Vietnamese population, extensive planning began only on April 18, 1975, when U.S. President Gerald Ford created an inter-agency task force headed by Julia Taft to p"coordinate...evacuation of U.S. citizens, Vietnamese citizens, and third-country nationals from Vietnam." By that time the military forces of North Vietnam were nearly in the outskirts of Saigon and the population of the city was swelled by hundreds of thousands of people displaced from areas already overrun by the communist armies.

The large-scale evacuation of Vietnamese by American military transport aircraft began on April 23 from Tan Son Nhut airport in Saigon. North Vietnamese rockets were fired at Tan Son Nhut on April 29, killing two American marines, and the airport was closed later that day. Thousands of Vietnamese and Americans were still clustered inside the American Embassy and in the streets around the Embassy awaiting evacuation. All that afternoon and night, military helicopters landed on the roof of the Embassy and carried evacuees to U.S. navy ships waiting off shore.

Tens of thousands of Vietnamese evacuated themselves, primarily by taking boats out to sea and demanding to be picked up by the navy. Early on the morning of April 30, the last Americans, 11 marines, were evacuated by helicopter from the Embassy roof. Many Vietnamese and third-country nationals awaiting or hoping for evacuation were left behind.

The total number of Vietnamese evacuated totaled 138,000. Most of them were taken by navy ships to Guam for processing to enter the United States, and from there they were flown to one of four military bases: Fort Chaffee in Arkansas, Camp Pendleton in California, Fort Indiantown Gap in Pennsylvania, and Eglin Air Force Base in Florida. 130,000 Vietnamese were resettled in every U.S. state over the next few months. A few thousand refugees were resettled in other countries, especially Canada, or elected to return to Vietnam.

A few months after the fall of Saigon, American officials realized that more refugees were crossing borders to escape Vietnam. The United States established a refugee office in Bangkok, Thailand, headed by Lionel Rosenblatt, to process additional refugees for entry into the United States.

== Hmong refugees ==
The Hmong and other highland peoples of Laos were U.S. allies in the Vietnam War, fending off for more than a decade the Pathet Lao and the North Vietnamese army. By May 1975, however, the communist armies were advancing on the last Hmong stronghold at Long Tieng. Fearing that the communists would carry out their threat to exterminate the Hmong, CIA agent Jerry Daniels organized an evacuation of close associates and Hmong military officers, including General Vang Pao, the Hmong commander. Using civilian aircraft and pilots, about 2,000 Hmong were evacuated by air to Thailand from May 10 to 14, 1975.

Unanticipated was that many Hmong would follow their leaders to Thailand, traveling on foot through high mountains, eluding soldiers, and crossing the Mekong River. Thousands died during the difficult journey. About 40,000 Hmong fled to Thailand in 1975 and more followed in the next few years. Most Hmong and other highlanders were housed at the Ban Vinai Refugee Camp. The U.S. did not initially contemplate resettlement of Hmong, believing that they would be incapable of adapting to life in the U.S. Lobbying by Americans who had worked with the Hmong caused a change in policy. 140,200 Hmong and other highland peoples were resettled worldwide from 1975 until 1997, the great majority in the United States. The Hmong resettlement program continued until 2005. The U.S. took in 9,201 Hmong in 2004 who were living at Wat Tham Krabok in Thailand. Thailand deported 4,000 Hmong refugees in 2009.

A few thousand Hmong were resettled in France and about 1,000 were resettled in the French overseas department of French Guiana, where they became prosperous by growing vegetables for the local market.

== Lowland Lao refugees ==
Along with the Hmong and other highland peoples a large number of lowland, ethnic Lao, crossed the Mekong River into Thailand. Between 1975 and 1995, the number of Laotians refugees, including both Hmong and lowland Lao, totalled 360,000. Most of the lowland Lao fleeing their country were urbanized and educated; many were former employees of the U.S. government. They were housed mostly at Nong Khai Refugee Camp just across the river from Laos. Between 1975 and 1997, 183,907 ethnic Lao were resettled worldwide.

== Hoa ==
The Hoa are ethnic Chinese living in Vietnam, especially in the Cholon area of Saigon. In 1975, an estimated one to two million Hoa lived in Vietnam, and they owned or controlled most of the commerce of South Vietnam. After South and North Vietnam were united under a single communist government in 1976, the new government began to transform the economy from capitalist to socialist. The people most affected were the Hoa. The Hoa people were threatened by the Vietnamese who sent them as agricultural workers in the New Economic Zones (state farms) set up by the Government; with 1.5 million relocated. Hoa businesses in Saigon were confiscated.

In the years following the Vietnam War, ethnic Chinese emigrated from Vietnam. Beginning in April 1978 about 450,000 Hoa would go overland to China or by boat to Hong Kong during the next few years. 265,000 Hoa, mainly land arrivals, would be resettled in China. Between 1975 and 1999, 143,700 Vietnamese refugees, mostly Hoa arriving by sea in Hong Kong, were resettled in other countries. More than 67,000 were repatriated to Vietnam.

Relations between China and Vietnam deteriorated, partly because of the repression of the Hoa. Although vast majority of the "Boat People" were ethnic Vietnamese (see below), those who sailed for refuge to China were largely Hoa people. In February 1979, following Vietnam's ousting of the China-backed genocidal Khmer Rouge and Vietnam's occupation of Cambodia, China launched an offensive against Vietnam, briefly occupied parts of its north and then withdrew from Vietnam. This conflict became known as the Sino-Vietnamese War. The Vietnamese government initiated a policy of encouraging the Hoa to leave the country and charging them a fee of several thousand dollars to do so. Because of the outflow, the Hoa population of Vietnam declined during the 1980s.

Ethnic Chinese refugees from the three Indochinese countries have established organizations for mutual support in their new settlements; several of these join the World Federation of Chinese Organizations from Vietnam, Cambodia and Laos (世界越棉寮華人團體聯合會).

== Boat people ==
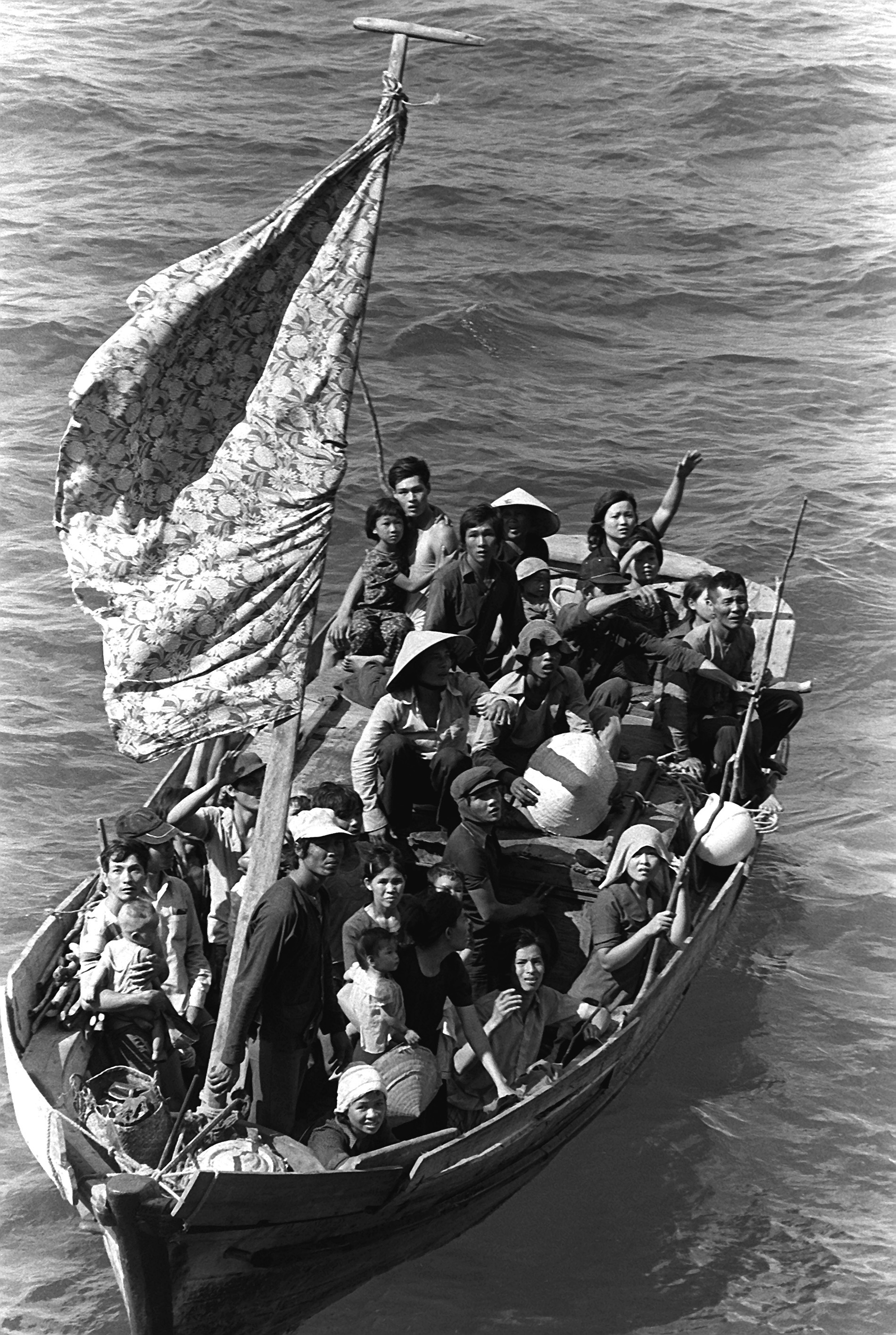
Vietnamese boat people awaiting rescue.

After the North Vietnamese takeover in April 1975, one million or more people were sent to "re-education" camps, often for several years, and the government attempted to destroy private enterprise, especially businesses owned by the Hoa. In September 1978, 1,220 "boat people" left Vietnam on an old ship and landed in Indonesia. That was the beginning of a flood of refugees arriving monthly by boat in Malaysia, Thailand, Indonesia, Hong Kong, and other countries. The number of boat people arriving monthly on foreign shores peaked at 56,000 in June 1979.

Most of the boat people left Vietnam in decrepit, leaky, overcrowded boats. They encountered storms, shortages of water and food, and, most seriously, pirates in the South China Sea and the Gulf of Thailand. Merchant ships encountering boats in distress often refused to pick up the refugees for fear that no country would allow them to unload the refugees.

Thai and Malay pirates attacked many of the small boats, raping and kidnapping women and stealing the possessions of the passengers. Authorities of the countries where they arrived often "pushed off" the refugee boats, refusing to allow them to land. The last of the boat people were repatriated from Malaysia in 2005.

The continued arrival of more and more boat people precipitated a political crisis with the Southeastern Asian countries refusing to allow additional refugees to land on their shores unless European and North American countries would promise resettlement to them. At a UN conference on refugees in Geneva in July 1979, the Western countries agreed to accept 260,000 refugees per year, up from 125,000, for resettlement, to facilitate processing of refugees, and to contribute additional funds to refugee assistance. Most importantly, the Vietnamese government promised to stem the flow of refugees and to cooperate in the Orderly Departure Program under which Vietnamese could apply for resettlement without leaving their homeland. The numbers of boat people leaving Vietnam quickly dropped off to more manageable numbers.

Between 1979 and 1982, the height of the humanitarian crisis, twenty Western countries, led by the United States, Canada, Australia, and France, accepted 623,800 Indochinese refugees for resettlement, most of them boat people. Resettlement continued until the 1990s. Under the Orderly Departure Program and Comprehensive Plan of Action more than 600,000 additional Vietnamese were resettled abroad between 1980 and 1997.

According to author Nghia M. Vo and the United Nations High Commissioner for Refugees (UNHCR), between 200,000 and 250,000 boat people died at sea.

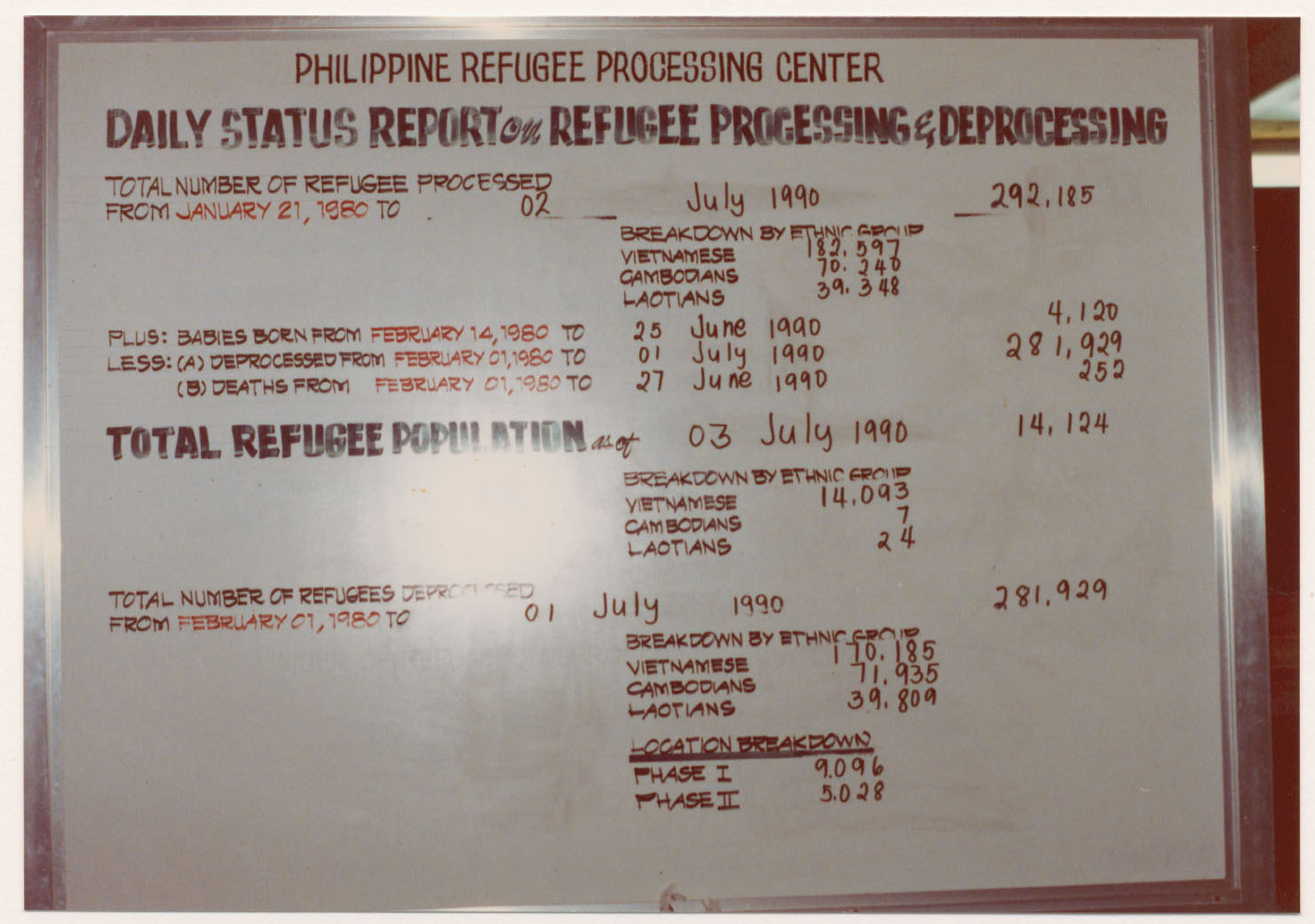
The Philippine Refugee Processing Center became the temporary home of many Indochinese refugees en route to resettlement countries in the 1980s.

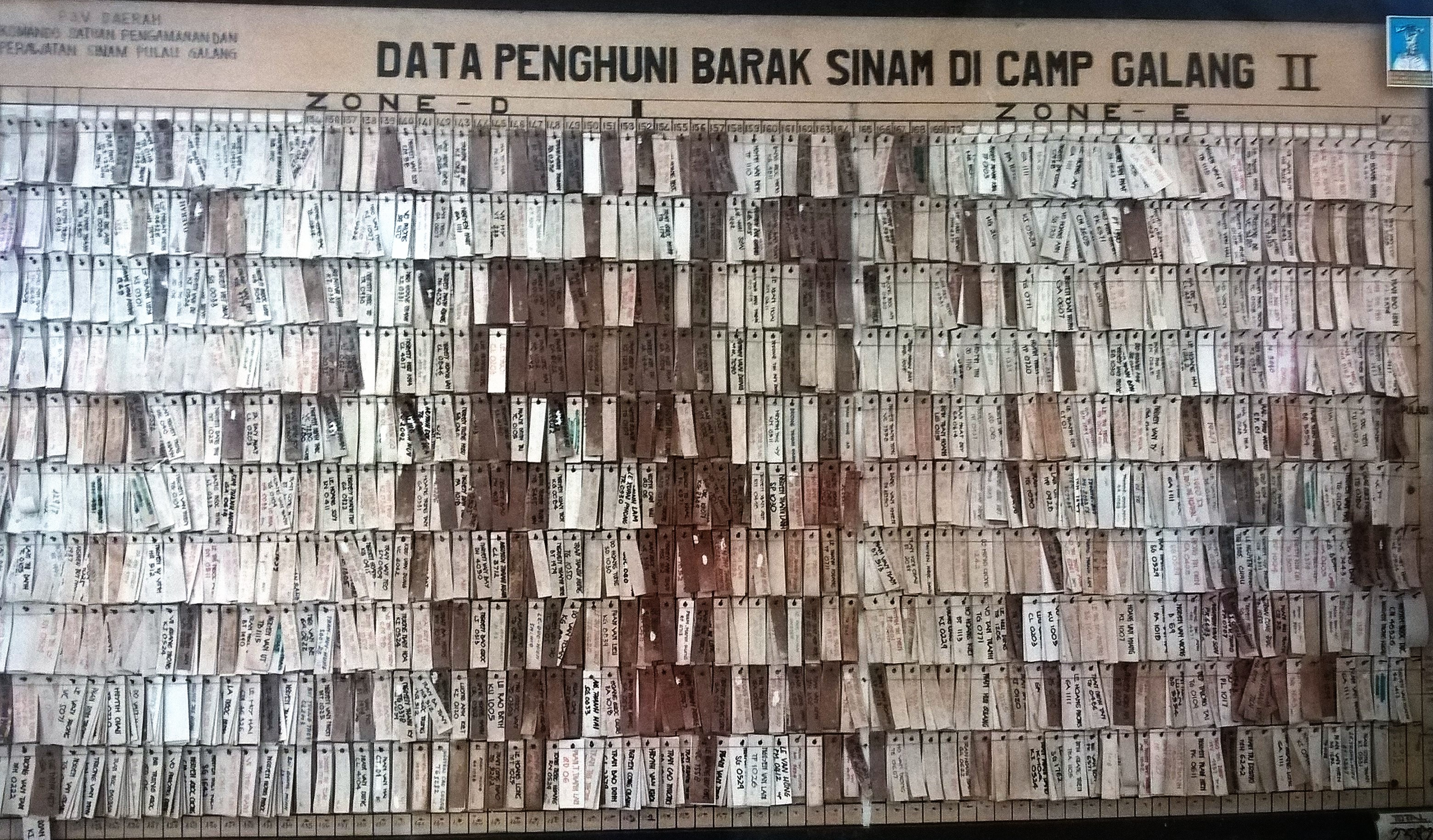
Stacks of refugee identification cards on Galang Refugee Camp in Indonesia. There were approximately 250,000 Vietnamese refuges recorded on the island.

== Vietnamese land refugees ==
About 40,000 Vietnamese made their way to Thailand by land through Cambodia in the 1980s. Most of them were housed in Thai border camps until resettled abroad.

== Cambodians ==
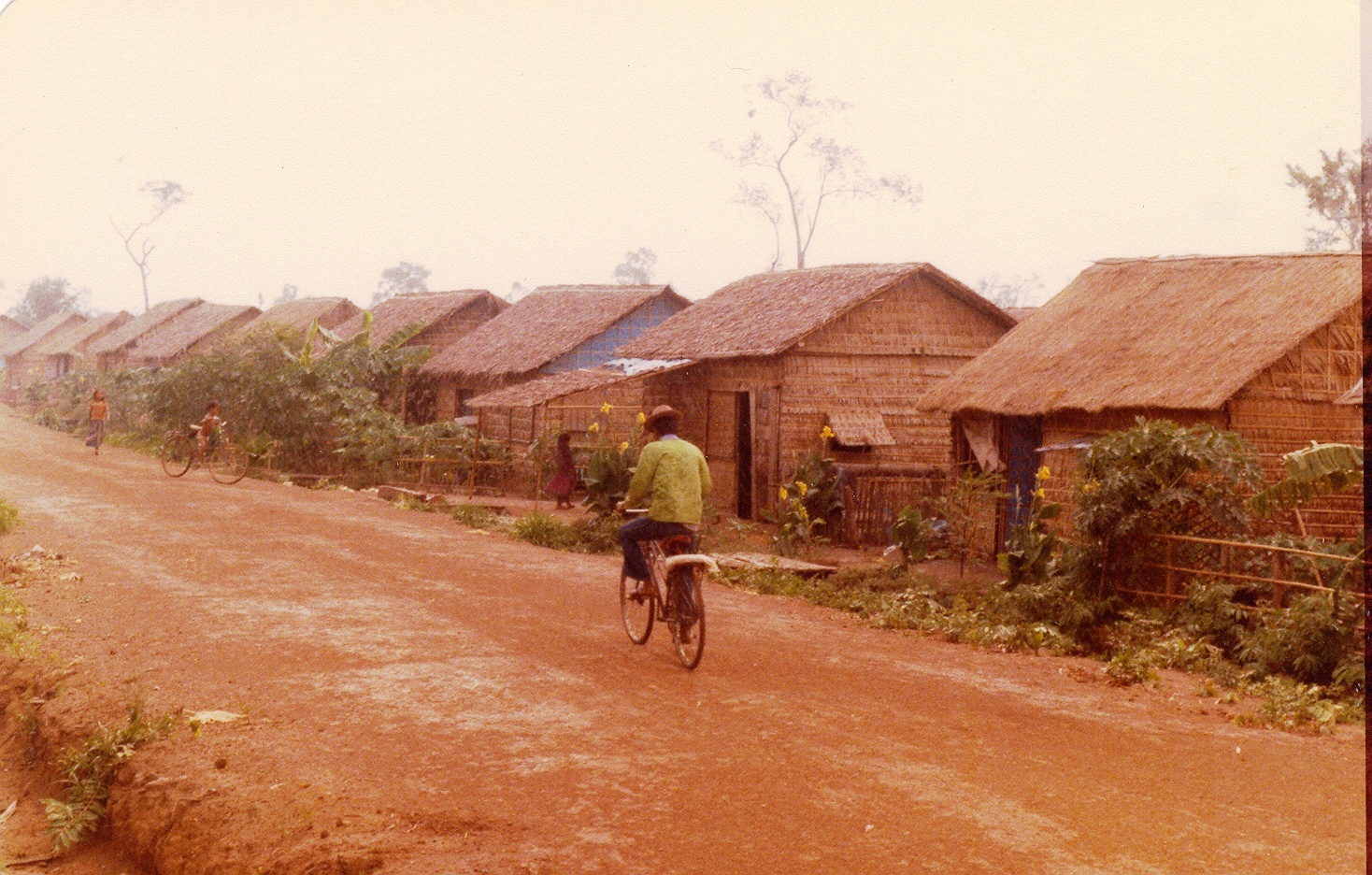
Refugee houses in Nong Samet camp in 1984. In the early days of the camp, refugees lived in tents or huts made of whatever material was available.

The conquest of Cambodia by the Khmer Rouge in April 1975 caused an outflow of more than 300,000 ethnic Chinese, ethnic Vietnamese, and Cambodians to Vietnam despite the unsettled political conditions there. However, only a few thousand Cambodians escaped the Khmer Rouge to Thailand as the border was guarded and seeded with minefields.

On December 25, 1978, Vietnam invaded Cambodia and overthrew the Khmer Rouge government, ending the Cambodian genocide. The Khmer Rouge and other resistance groups fled into the mountains and the border areas, but the people of the ravaged country—one to three million of whom had been killed by the Khmer Rouge—faced starvation and hundreds of thousands of them arrived at the border of Thailand seeking food and safety. The Thai refused to recognize the Cambodians as refugees but housed some of them in camps inside Thailand at Sa Kaeo and Khao-I-Dang.

Most Cambodians were stopped at the border and took up residence in chaotic camps straddling the border between Cambodia and Thailand. Early arrivals at Sa Kaeo, mostly Khmer Rouge and their families fleeing the Vietnamese army, were in the last extremity of starvation. By the end of 1979, about 750,000 Cambodians were believed to be in Thailand, in the border camps, or near the border attempting to cross into Thailand. The Thai "pushed back" many of the Cambodians attempting to cross, most notably at Preah Vihear where thousands of Cambodians died in a mine field.

The international response to the Cambodian humanitarian crisis was to set up a "land bridge". International aid and relief agencies began distributing food, seed, and farm tools to Cambodians who came to the border and returned to the interior of the country to resume farming. By January 1980, 10,000 Cambodians arrived every day on foot, bicycle, or oxcart, and each received 10 to 30 kilograms of rice. By January 1981, when the program ended, more than 700,000 Cambodians had received food, seeds, and farm implements and the threat of famine within Cambodia had abated.

In Thailand and in border camps, however, were hundreds of thousands of Cambodians. 260,000 of them were resettled abroad in the 1980s and 1990s. 390,000 were repatriated to Cambodia, mostly from 1991 to 1993, as the result of a peace agreement, the disarmament of contending factions, and the withdrawal of the Vietnamese army from Cambodia.

== Montagnards ==
About one million highland peoples, called Montagnards, lived in Vietnam in 1975. Although the Montagnards were firm allies of the United States, especially the Green Berets, very few of them were among the 1975 evacuees from Saigon. Their guerilla war against the Vietnamese communists continued for the next 15 years, and a few Montagnards fled across the border to remote, jungle areas of Cambodia sandwiched between the hostile Khmer Rouge and Vietnamese.

The Montagnards were largely forgotten but in 1986, 212 escaped to Thailand and were resettled in Raleigh, North Carolina. In 1992, the UNHCR discovered another group of 400 living in Cambodia. Humanitarian workers, the UNHCR, and former Green Berets took up their cause and, shortly, they were resettled in Greensboro, North Carolina. A total of 9,000 Montagnards were eventually resettled in the United States.

== Indochinese resettled and repatriated ==
The following table lists the number of Indochinese resettled in the leading countries and the world from 1975 to 1997. A few thousand have also been resettled since 1997, mostly in the United States.

Country	Vietnamese (including Hoa, Montagnard)	Laotians (including Hmong, other highlanders)	Cambodians	Total resettled	Notes
United States	883,317	251,334	152,748	1,287,399	
Vietnam			320,000	320,000	includes 150,000 Cambodians and 170,000 ethnic Chinese and Vietnamese who fled the Khmer Rouge in Cambodia
China	263,000	2,500		283,000	nearly all Hoa
Canada	163,415	17,274	21,489	202,178	
Australia	157,863	10,239	17,605	185,700	
France	46,348	34,236	38,598	119,182	
Germany	28,916	1,706	998	31,620	
United Kingdom	24,267	346	381	24,994	
New Zealand	6,099	1,350	5,995	13,344	
Netherlands	11,546	33	523	12,102	
Japan	8,231	1,273	1,223	10,727	
Norway	10,066	2	178	10,246	
Malaysia			10,000	10,000	All Cambodian refugees resettled in Malaysia were Cham Muslims
Switzerland	7,304	593	1,717	9,614	
Sweden	9,099	26	214	9,339	
Denmark	7,007	12	51	7,070	
Belgium	5,158	989	896	7,043	
Other countries	10,343	4,694	8,268	25,605	
Grand Total	1,642,179	324,107	580,884	2,547,170	

Source: Robinson, W. Courtland Terms of Refuge United Nations High Commissioner for Refugees, London: Zed Books, 1998 p. 270, 276, Appendix 2; Far Eastern Economic Review, June 23, 1978, p. 20

Indochinese repatriated, voluntarily or involuntarily, to their home countries with assistance from UNHCR totalled 525,000 between 1975 and 1997. These included 390,000 Cambodians, 127,000 Vietnamese, and 27,000 Laotians. Many more thousands returned of their own accord or remained surreptitiously in their country of refuge.

== In popular culture ==
The Vietnamese refugee crisis is depicted in the movies The Story of Woo Viet, Boat People, Turtle Beach, Green Dragon, The Beautiful Country, Journey from the Fall, Ride the Thunder, and Ru.

The Cambodian refugees crisis is depicted in the movies The Killing Fields, The Gate, and First They Killed My Father.

The Laotian refugees crisis is depicted in the movie Love is Forever (1983) and The Betrayal – Nerakhoon (2008).

In the 2004 science-fiction anime series Ghost in the Shell: S.A.C. 2nd GIG, the aftermath of a fictional 4th World War, also known as the 2nd Vietnam War for the seat of its main theatre, gives rise to a second wave of Indochina Refugees arrive in large numbers in Japan, as well as in diaspora to other parts of Asia such as China and Taiwan. Their developing and evolving society, and the crisis it generates, serve as the major plot these of the series.

== See also ==
- Bidong Island
- Comprehensive Plan of Action
- European migrant crisis; similar refugee crisis happened 40 years later
- Galang Refugee Camp
- Jerry Daniels
- Khao-I-Dang
- Lionel Rosenblatt
- Nong Chan Refugee Camp
- Nong Samet Refugee Camp
- Operation New Life
- Operation New Arrivals
- Orderly Departure Program
- Philippine Refugee Processing Center
- Preah Vihear
- Sa Kaeo Refugee Camp
- Sham Shui Po Barracks
- Vietnamese people in Hong Kong
- Wat Tham Krabok
- Yvette Pierpaoli
