= Christopher Okinda =

Kenyan actor (born 1980)

- Born: Christopher Odhiambo Okinda; December 15, 1980 (age 45); Mombasa, Kenya
- Education: St Mary's School, Yala
- Occupations: Actor, film director, producer, author, radio presenter
- Years active: 1993–present
- Parents: Alois Okinda (father); Elizabeth Apiyo Aruwa (mother)

Christopher Odhiambo Okinda (born 15 December 1980), is a Kenyan actor. He is best known for the roles in the films The Constant Gardener and The White Massai. Apart from acting, he is also a film director, producer, author and Radio presenter.

== Personal life ==
He was born on 15 December 1980 in Mombasa, Kenya to Elizabeth Apiyo Aruwa and Alois Okinda. His father was polygamous, therefore he was raised by his mother, with whom he lived. He first attended Aga Khan Primary School (Parklands, Kenya) and then Our Lady of Mercy Primary School in 1992. Later, he moved to St Peter's Mumias Boys primary in 1994 and finally St Mary's School (in Yala) in 1996.

== Career ==
In 2005, he started film debut with the thriller film The Constant Gardener directed by Fernando Meirelles. Okinda played a minor supportive role as 'Doctor' in the film. The film received positive critical acclaim and screened at several film festivals.

With the success of his maiden acting appearance, he was then selected to the 2005 The White Massai. Meanwhile, he founded the theater film Company 'Something Productions'. Through the company, he made the plays in his mother's native Dholuo language. Apart from acting, he currently work as the morning show radio host and creative director of 'Hot 96 FM' in Kenya.

== Filmography ==
Year	Film	Role	Genre	Ref.
2005	The Constant Gardener	Doctor	Film	
2005	The White Massai	Officer Info Switch	Film	
