= The Constant Gardener (film) =

2005 film by Fernando Meirelles

- Theatrical release poster
- Directed by: Fernando Meirelles
- Screenplay by: Jeffrey Caine
- Based on: The Constant Gardener by John le Carré
- Produced by: Simon Channing Williams
- Starring: Ralph Fiennes; Rachel Weisz; Danny Huston; Bill Nighy; Pete Postlethwaite
- Cinematography: César Charlone
- Edited by: Claire Simpson
- Music by: Alberto Iglesias
- Production companies: Focus Features; UK Film Council; Potboiler Productions; Scion Films
- Distributed by: Universal Pictures (United Kingdom, through United International Pictures); Kinowelt Filmverleih (Germany)
- Release dates: 2 September 2005 (United States); 11 November 2005 (United Kingdom)
- Running time: 128 minutes
- Countries: United Kingdom; Germany
- Language: English
- Budget: $25 million
- Box office: $82.4 million

The Constant Gardener is a 2005 drama thriller film directed by Fernando Meirelles. The screenplay by Jeffrey Caine is based on John le Carré's 2001 novel. The story follows Justin Quayle (Ralph Fiennes), a British diplomat in Kenya, as he tries to solve the murder of his wife Tessa (Rachel Weisz), an Amnesty International activist, alternating with flashbacks telling the story of their relationship.

The film's title derives from Justin's gentle but diligent attention to his plants throughout the film. The film was a critical and box office success and earned four Oscar nominations, with Weisz winning Best Supporting Actress.

== Plot ==
British diplomat and avid horticulturalist Justin Quayle is confronted by Amnesty International activist Tessa during a lecture in London. They strike up a romance, and marry after she accompanies him to his posting in Kenya. She befriends Belgian doctor Arnold Bluhm, leading to rumours of an affair. Tessa has no qualms confronting corruption, to the chagrin of Justin's superiors, and she loses a child late in pregnancy.

Tessa and Arnold connect recent local deaths to drug trials being conducted by the Kenyan-based company Three Bees using the drug Dypraxa. They write a damaging report on the drug and Tessa gives it to Justin's colleague Sandy Woodrow, the British High Commissioner, who sends it to Sir Bernard Pellegrin, head of the Africa Desk at the Foreign Office. Pellegrin responds with an incriminating letter to Sandy, which Tessa persuades him to show her, and she steals it before departing for Lokichogio with Arnold.

Sandy informs Justin that a white woman and black driver have been killed near Lake Turkana, and that Tessa and Arnold shared a room at Lodwar before hiring a car. Justin and Sandy identify Tessa's mutilated body, but Arnold's whereabouts remain unknown. Police confiscate Tessa's computer and files, but Justin finds her keepsake box, containing a letter from Sandy declaring his love for her and asking her to return Pellegrin's letter, and records of Three Bees' tests.

After Tessa's burial, Justin learns from his colleague Ghita that Tessa kept Arnold's secret that he was gay, as homosexuality is illegal in Kenya. Pursuing the truth about his wife's murder, he follows the trail of her report. Justin is briefly detained by police and confronts Three Bees' CEO Kenny Curtiss, but receives no answers.

Returning to London, Justin's passport is confiscated. He dines with Pellegrin, who lies that Arnold must have murdered Tessa, and believes that Justin has his incriminating letter. Justin meets with Tessa's cousin and lawyer Ham, and they access her computer files to reveal her investigation into Dypraxa and its manufacturer, Swiss-Canadian pharmaceutical conglomerate KDH, which hired Three Bees to test the drug on unsuspecting Kenyans as a treatment for tuberculosis.

Justin receives a threatening note and Ham provides him with a fake passport to travel to Germany to meet with Tessa's contact Birgit. She is part of a pharmaceutical watchdog group and is reluctant to speak due to the targeting of her group. Justin is attacked in his hotel room and warned to stop investigating. Arnold's body is found having been tortured to death, while the announcement of a safe Dypraxa causes KDH's share price to soar.

Returning to Kenya, Justin confronts Sandy, who admits that Tessa's report was silenced to save KDH from spending millions redeveloping the drug. Justin is approached by Curtiss, who has been betrayed by KDH, and brought to a mass grave of Dypraxa test subjects. Curtiss points Justin to Dr Lorbeer, Dypraxa's inventor, who has fled to Sudan. Tim Donohue, a friend in British intelligence, confirms that Pellegrin had Tessa and Arnold killed. Unable to convince Justin to return home, he gives him a gun.

Justin travels to confront Lorbeer, who is treating remote villagers to atone for the lives claimed by his drug. The village is attacked by raiders, but Justin and Lorbeer escape in a UN aid plane, and Lorbeer reveals that he has Pellegrin's letter. Tessa convinced him to record the truth about Dypraxa, but he changed his mind, instead informing KDH that Tessa and Arnold were en route to expose the company to the UN.

Justin convinces the pilot to mail Pellegrin's letter to Ham, and to drop him off at Lake Turkana. Removing the bullets from his gun, his final thoughts are of Tessa before he is killed by KDH's henchmen. In London at Tessa and Justin's memorial service, Pellegrin lies that Justin committed suicide in the same place his wife died.

Ham announces the reading of an epistle, but instead reads Pellegrin's letter, exposing the deaths caused by Dypraxa and the subsequent coverup. Pellegrin storms out as Ham implicates the British government, KDH, and public complacency regarding the human cost of medicine they take for granted.

== Cast ==
- Ralph Fiennes as Justin Quayle
- Rachel Weisz as Tessa Abbott-Quayle
- Danny Huston as Sandy Woodrow
- Hubert Koundé as Dr Arnold Bluhm
- Archie Panjabi as Ghita Pearson
- Bill Nighy as Sir Bernard Pellegrin
- Gerard McSorley as Sir Kenneth "Kenny" Curtiss
- Pete Postlethwaite as Dr Lorbeer
- Donald Sumpter as Tim Donohue
- Richard McCabe as Arthur “Ham” Hammond
- Juliet Aubrey as Gloria Woodrow
- Nick Reding as Crick
- Christopher Okinda as Doctor Brandt
- Keith Pearson as Porter Coleridge

== Inspiration and themes ==
The plot of the film is loosely based on a real-life case in Kano, Nigeria involving antibacterial testing by Pfizer on small children.

== Production ==
The film was shot partly in 16mm on location in Loiyangalani and the slums of Kibera, a section of Nairobi, Kenya. Circumstances in the area so affected the cast and crew that producer Simon Channing Williams led the creation of the Constant Gardener Trust in order to address issues of sanitation and education in the area.

Principal photography of the film occurred from May 10, 2004 to August 7, 2004.

Kate Winslet and Eva Green were considered for the female lead before Weisz was cast.

Lupita Nyong'o worked as a production assistant on the film.

== Reception ==
=== Box office ===
The film's worldwide gross was $82,466,670.

=== Critical response ===
On the film aggregator website Rotten Tomatoes, The Constant Gardener has a score of 83%, based on 192 critical reviews, with an average rating of 7.6/10. The consensus reads, "The Constant Gardener is a smart, gripping, and suspenseful thriller with rich performances from the leads." It also has a score of 82 out of 100 on Metacritic, based on 39 critics. Audiences polled by CinemaScore gave the film an average grade of "B" on an A+ to F scale.

Roger Ebert of the Chicago Sun-Times called it "one of the year's best films". USA Today noted that the film's "passion, betrayal, gorgeous cinematography, social commentary, stellar performances and clever wit puts it in a special category near perfection". However, Michael Atkinson of The Village Voice criticized the film as "a cannonballing mélange of hack-cuts, impressionistic close-ups, and tropical swelter".

== Release ==
=== Home media ===
DVD versions of the film were released in the United States and United Kingdom on January 1st, 2006 and March 13th, 2006, respectively.

== Author's dedication and afterword ==
John le Carré, in the first edition of the 2001 novel on which the film is based, provided both a dedication and a personal afterword. The dedication and part of the afterword (amended) are reproduced in the closing credits of the film. The first states: "This film is dedicated to Yvette Pierpaoli and all other aid workers who lived and died giving a damn." The latter continues (in the next credit): "Nobody in this story, and no outfit or corporation, thank God, is based upon an actual person or outfit in the real world. But I can tell you this. As my journey through the pharmaceutical jungle progressed, I came to realize that, by comparison with the reality, my story was as tame as a holiday postcard." The text appears over John le Carré's name.

== See also ==
- Abdullahi v. Pfizer, Inc.
- Medicine Man
