= The Constant Gardener =

2001 novel by John le Carré

- First UK edition cover
- Author: John le Carré
- Language: English, German, Swahili
- Publisher: Hodder & Stoughton
- Publication date: 4 January 2001
- Publication place: United Kingdom
- Media type: Print (Hardcover and Paperback)
- Pages: 557
- ISBN: 0-340-73337-3
- OCLC: 59510670
- LC Class: PR6062.E33 L43 2001

The Constant Gardener is a 2001 novel by British author John le Carré. The novel tells the story of Justin Quayle, a British diplomat whose activist wife is murdered. Believing there is something behind the murder, he seeks to uncover the truth and finds an international conspiracy of corrupt bureaucracy and pharmaceutical money.

The plot was based on a real-life case in Kano, Nigeria. The book was adapted into a feature film in 2005.

== Plot summary ==
Justin Quayle, a British diplomat in Nairobi, Kenya, is told that his activist wife, Tessa, was killed while travelling with a doctor friend in a desolate region of Africa. Investigating on his own, Quayle discovers that her murder, reportedly committed by her friend, may have had more sinister roots.

Justin learns that Tessa had uncovered a corporate scandal involving medical experimentation in Africa. KVH (Karel Vita Hudson), a large pharmaceutical company working under the cover of AIDS tests and treatments, is testing a tuberculosis drug that has severe side effects. Rather than help the trial subjects and begin again with a new drug, KVH covered up the side effects and improved the drug only in anticipation of a massive multi-drug-resistant tuberculosis outbreak.

Justin travels the world, often under assumed identities, to reconstruct the circumstances leading to Tessa's murder. As he begins to piece together Tessa's final report on the fraudulent drug tests, he learns that the roots of the conspiracy stretch further than he could have imagined; to a German pharmawatch NGO, an African aid station, and, most disturbingly to him, corrupt civil servants in the British Foreign Office.

John le Carré writes in the book's afterword: "by comparison with the reality, my story [is] as tame as a holiday postcard". The book is dedicated to Yvette Pierpaoli, a French activist who died during the course of her aid work.

== Film adaptation ==
In August of 2005, Focus Features released a film adaptation of The Constant Gardener directed by Fernando Meirelles, starring Ralph Fiennes and Rachel Weisz. Weisz won the Oscar, Golden Globe, and SAG Awards for her performance as Tessa. Screenwriter Jeffrey Caine was also nominated for an Academy Award for Best Adapted Screenplay. The film also received ten BAFTA nominations including Best Film, winning one for Best Editing. Meirelles, Fiennes, Weisz, and Caine were each nominated here as well.
