= Preah Vihear =

Ancient Buddhist temple in Cambodia

- Prasat Preah Vihear
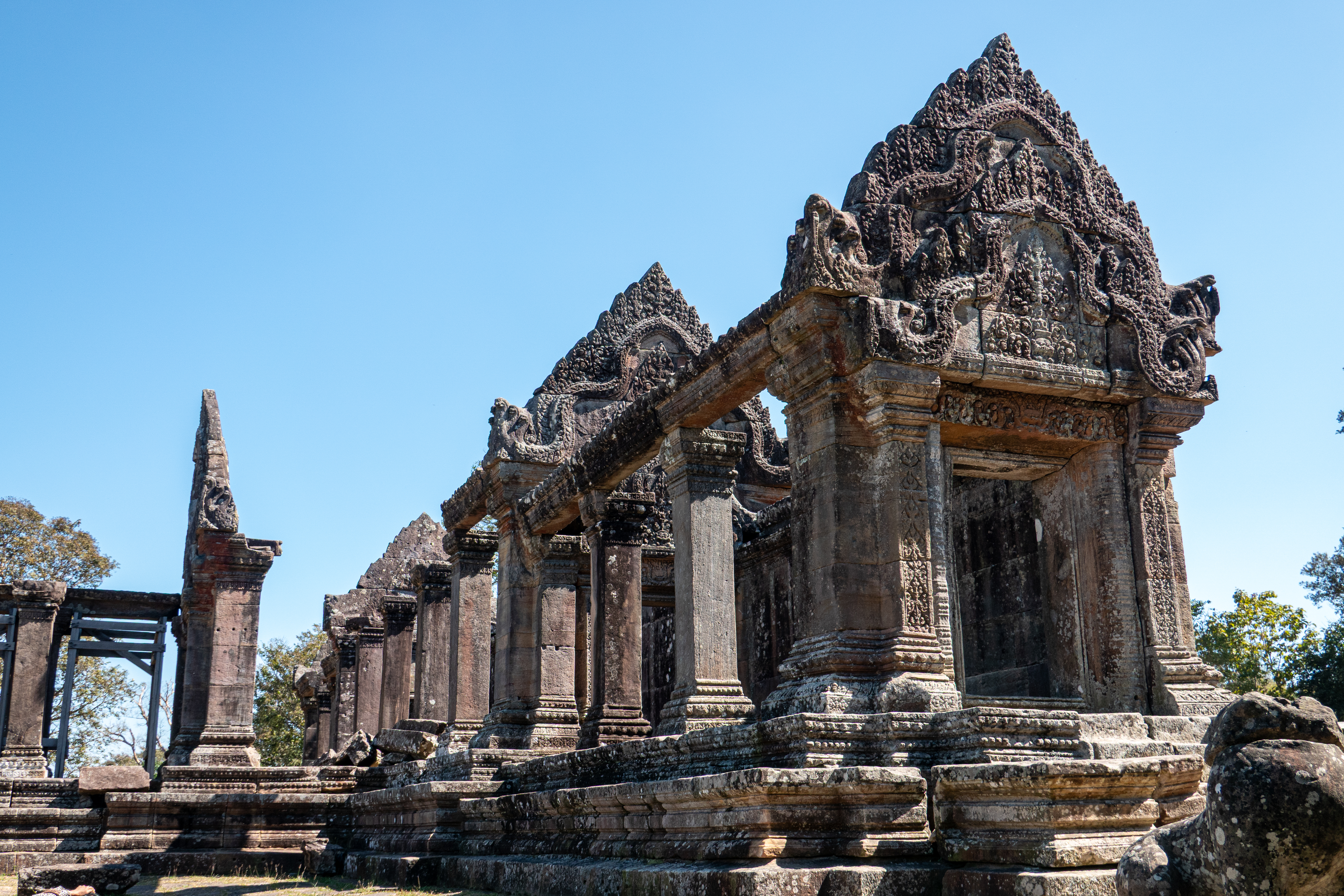

- Location in Cambodia

Religion
- Affiliation: Buddhism
- Festival: Shrine

Location
- Location: Choam Khsant District, Preah Vihear province
- Country: Cambodia
- Coordinates: 14°23′26″N 104°40′49″E

Architecture
- Creator: Suryavarman I and Suryavarman II
- Completed: 11th–12th centuries AD
- Inscriptions: K.383 K.380 K.381 K.382
- Elevation: 525 m (1,722 ft)

Website
- preahvihearauthority.gov.kh
- Location within Cambodia

UNESCO World Heritage Site
- Official name: Temple of Preah Vihear
- Criteria: Cultural: (i)
- Reference: 1224
- Inscription: 2008 (32nd Session)
- Area: 154.7 ha (382 acres)
- Buffer zone: 2,642.5 ha (6,530 acres)

Preah Vihear (lit. 'vihāra of the gods') (Khmer: ប្រាសាទព្រះវិហារ Prasat Preah Vihear) is an ancient edifice built by the Khmer Empire as a Hindu temple on top of a 525-metre (1,722 ft) cliff in the Dângrêk Mountains, in Cambodia. Over time, it became a Buddhist temple.

As a key edifice of the empire's spiritual life, Preah Vihear was supported and modified by successive kings and thus bears elements of several architectural styles. It is unusual among Khmer temples in being constructed along a long north–south axis, rather than having the conventional rectangular plan with orientation toward the east. The temple gives its name to the surrounding Preah Vihear province.

In 1962, after a lengthy dispute between Cambodia and Thailand over ownership, the International Court of Justice in the Hague ruled that the temple is in Cambodia. On 7 July 2008, Preah Vihear was listed as a UNESCO World Heritage Site. This prompted an escalation in the dispute between Cambodia and Thailand over the temple, which was settled in favour of Cambodia by another ICJ ruling in 2013.

== Location ==
The temple was built at the top of Poy Tadi, a steep cliff in the Dângrêk Mountain range that is the natural border between Cambodia and Thailand. The site is listed by Cambodia as being in Svay Chrum village, Kan Tout commune, in Choam Khsant District of Preah Vihear Province. It is 140 km from Angkor Wat and 418 km from Phnom Penh. In 1962, the ICJ ruled that the temple building belonged to Cambodia.

=== Site ===
The temple complex runs 800 m (2,600 ft) along a north–south axis, facing the plains to the north, from which it is cut off by the international border. It consists of a causeway and steps rising up the hill towards the sanctuary, which sits on the clifftop at the southern end of the complex (120 m or 390 ft above the northern end of the complex, 525 m or 1,722 ft above the Cambodian plain and 625 m or 2,051 ft above sea level). Although this structure is very different from the temple mountains found at Angkor, it serves the same purpose as a stylised representation of Mount Meru. The approach to the sanctuary is punctuated by five gopuras (these are conventionally numbered from the sanctuary outwards, so gopura five is the first to be reached by visitors). Each of the gopuras before the courtyards is reached by a set of steps and so marks a change in height. The gopuras also block a visitor's view of the next part of the temple until they pass through the gateway, making it impossible to see the complex as a whole from any one point. The fifth gopura, in the Koh Ker style, retains traces of the red paint with which it was once decorated, although the tiled roof has now disappeared. The fourth gopura is more recent, from the Khleang/Baphuon periods, and has on its southern outer pediment "one of the masterpieces of Preah Vihear" (Freeman, p. 162): a depiction of the Churning of the Sea of Milk. The third is the largest and is also flanked by two halls. The sanctuary is reached via two successive courtyards, in the outer of which are two libraries.

== Nomenclature ==
Plan of Prasat Preah Vihear

The official Cambodian name Prasat Preah Vihear (Khmer: ប្រាសាទព្រះវិហារ) adds the generic term prasat (from Sanskrit: प्रासाद}, romanized: prāsāda, lit. 'temple') to preah vihear (Khmer: ព្រះ, romanized: preah, lit. 'holy'; vihear—from Sanskrit: विहार, romanized: vihāra, lit. 'temple, monastery, spiritual abode'). In the Thai language, the structure is known as ปราสาทพระวิหาร (Phra Wihan / Phra Viharn). The site, as opposed to the structure itself, i.e., the massif, is referred to as a "mountain" (Khmer: ភ្នំ, romanized: phnom; Thai: เขา, romanized: khao); Cambodians refer to the temple site as Phnom Preah Vihear (ភ្នំព្រះវិហារ), whereas Thais refer to it as Khao Phra Wihan (เขาพระวิหาร)—giving its name to the officially designated Khao Phra Wihan National Park. These terms carry significant political connotations (see below: § Disputes over ownership since 2008).

== History ==
=== Khmer Empire ===
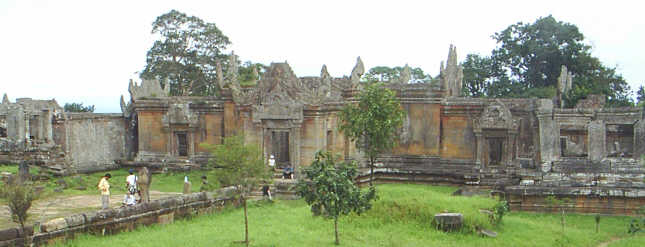
Entrance to the temple structure

Construction of the first temple on the site began in the early 9th century. Both then and in the following centuries, it was dedicated to the Hindu god Shiva in his manifestations as the mountain gods Sikharesvara and Bhadresvara. The earliest surviving parts of the temple, however, date from the Koh Ker period in the early 10th century, when the empire's capital was at the city of that name. Today, elements of the Banteay Srei style of the late 10th century can be seen, but most of the temple was constructed during the reigns of the Khmer kings Suryavarman I (1006–1050) and Suryavarman II (1113–1150). An inscription found at the temple provides a detailed account of Suryavarman II studying sacred rituals, celebrating religious festivals, and making gifts, including white parasols, golden bowls, and elephants, to his spiritual advisor, the aged Brahmin Divakarapandita. The Brahmin himself took an interest in the temple, according to the inscription, donating to it a golden statue of a dancing Shiva known as Nataraja. In the wake of the decline of Hinduism in the region, the site was converted to use by Buddhists.

=== Modern history and ownership dispute ===
Temple of Preah Vihear (Cambodia v. Thailand)
- Court: International Court of Justice
- Decided: 15 June 1962

Case history
- Subsequent action: Request for Interpretation of the Judgment of 15 June 1962 in the Case concerning the Temple of Preah Vihear (Cambodia v. Thailand) (Cambodia v. Thailand)

Case opinions
- Preah Vihear is situated on Cambodian territory; Thailand is under an obligation to withdraw any military or police force stationed there and to restore to Cambodia any objects removed from the ruins since 1954.

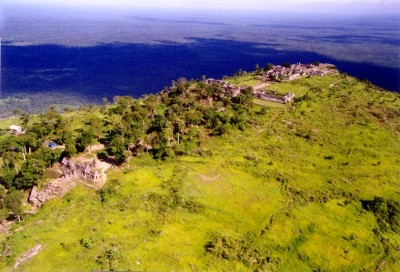
The temple is located on a hill, oriented along a north–south axis. The plain in the upper part of this picture is the Cambodian side to the south.

In modern times, Prasat Preah Vihear was rediscovered and became subject of a dispute between Thailand and the newly independent Cambodia. This came about due to the different maps each party used in national delimitation. In 1904, Siam and the French colonial authorities ruling Cambodia formed a joint commission to demarcate their mutual border to largely follow the watershed line of the Dângrêk mountain range, which placed nearly the entirety of the temple on Thailand's side. France, who was the protector of Cambodia at the time, agreed with Siam in the Franco-Siamese boundary treaty of 1904. The Mixed Commission was set up in 1905, and it was to carry out delimitation between Siam and Cambodia. In 1907, after survey work, French officers drew up a map to show the border's location. Cambodia used the map published by French geographers in 1908 (called "Annex I map"), which showed the temple on Cambodian territory, while Thailand used the provisions of the treaty of 1904, which reads:

"The frontier between Siam and Cambodia starts on the left shore of the Great Lake. From the mouth of the river Stung Roluos, it follows the parallel from that point in an easterly direction, until it meets the river Prek Kompong Tiam, then, turning northwards, it merges with the meridian from that meeting point as far as the Pnom Dang Rek mountain chain. From there it follows the watershed between the basins of Nam Sen and the Mekong on the one hand, and the Nam Moun on the other, and joins the Pnom Padang chain, the crest of which it follows eastwards as far as the Mekong. Upstream from that point, the Mekong remains the frontier of the Kingdom of Siam, in accordance with Article 1 of the Treaty of 3 October 1893".

The resulting topographic map, which was sent to Siamese authorities and used in the 1962 International Court of Justice (ICJ) ruling, showed the line deviating slightly from the watershed in the Preah Vihear area, placing all of the temples on the Cambodian side.

Following the withdrawal of French troops from Cambodia in 1954, Thai forces occupied the temple to enforce their claim. Cambodia protested and in 1959 asked the ICJ to rule that the temple and the surrounding land lay on Cambodian territory; the case became a volatile political issue in both countries. Diplomatic relations were severed, and threats of force were voiced by both governments.

The court proceedings focused not on questions of cultural heritage nor on which state was the successor to the Khmer Empire, but rather on Siam's supposed longtime acceptance of the 1908 map. The treaty of 1907, precisely defining the border between Thailand and Cambodia, was approved by both parties. The day after the signing, The Siam Observer newspaper, the official organ of the Thai government, declared: "If the balance of the territorial exchanges seems to tip in favor of France, the equilibrium will be reestablished by the concessions made by France regarding jurisdiction over Asiatic subjects and protégés." Siam subsequently made no protest against the treaty until it came under Japan's influence, thirty years later.

Arguing in the Hague for Cambodia was former U.S. Secretary of State Dean Acheson, while Thailand's legal team included a former British attorney general, Frank Soskice. Cambodia contended that the map showing the temple as being on Cambodian soil was the authoritative document. Thailand argued that the map was invalid and that it was not an official document of the border commission, and that it clearly violated the commission's working principle that the border would follow the watershed line, which would place most of it in Thailand. If Thailand had not protested the map earlier, the Thai side said, it was because Thai authorities had had actual possession of the temple for some period of time, due to the great difficulty of scaling the steep hillside from the Cambodian side, or it simply had not understood that the map was wrong.

=== ICJ judgment ===
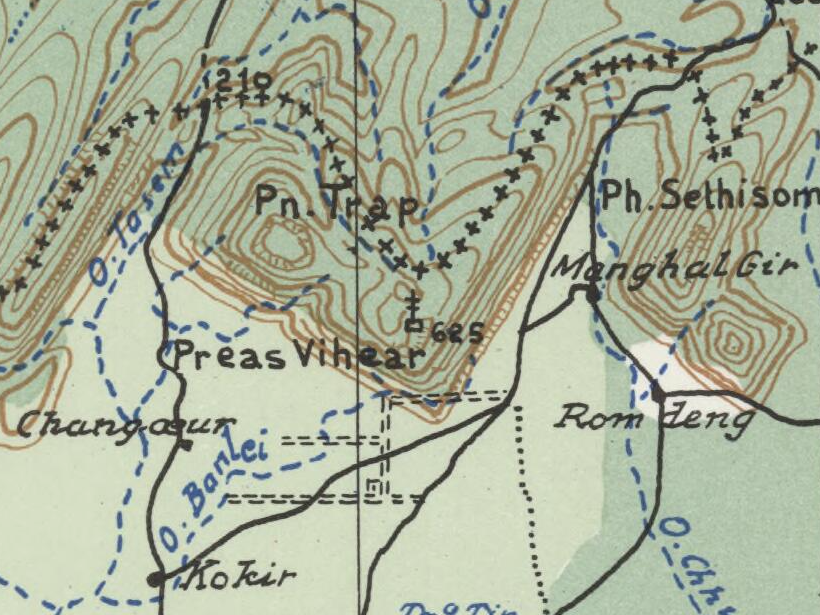
The positions of the temple and the border, as depicted in the Annex I Map, which formed the basis of the court's judgment

On 15 June 1962, the ICJ ruled 9 to 3 that the temple belonged to Cambodia, that Thailand was obliged to withdraw all troops stationed there and, by a vote of 7 to 5, that Thailand must return any antiquities such as sculptures that it had removed from the temple. The Annex I map did not bind both parties because it was not the work of the Mixed Commission per the treaty. However, both parties adopted the map, and the demarcation line in it therefore had a binding character. In its decision, the court noted that in over the five decades after the map was drawn, the Siamese/Thai authorities had not objected in various international forums to its depiction of the temple's location. Nor did they object when a French colonial official received the Siamese scholar and government figure Prince Damrong at the temple in 1930. Under the legal principle Qui tacet consentire videtur si loqui debuisset ac potuisset ("he who is silent is taken to agree"), the court ruled that Thailand had accepted and benefited from other parts of the border treaty. With these and other acts, it said, Thailand had accepted the map, and therefore Cambodia was the owner of the temple.

"It was clear from the record, however, that the maps were communicated to the Siamese Government as purporting to represent the outcome of the work of delimitation; since there was no reaction on the part of the Siamese authorities, either then or for many years, they must be held to have acquiesced. The maps were moreover communicated to the Siamese members of the Mixed Commission, who said nothing, to the Siamese Minister of the Interior, Prince Damrong, who thanked the French Minister in Bangkok for them, and to the Siamese provincial governors, some of whom knew of Preah Vihear. If the Siamese authorities accepted the Annex I map without investigation, they could not now plead any error vitiating the reality of their consent.

The Siamese Government and later the Thai Government had raised no query about the Annex I map prior to its negotiations with Cambodia in Bangkok in 1958. But in 1934–1935, a survey had established a divergence between the map line and the true line of the watershed, and other maps had been produced showing the Temple as being in Thailand. Thailand had nevertheless continued to also use and indeed to publish maps showing Preah Vihear as lying in Cambodia. Moreover, in the course of the negotiations for the 1925 and 1937 Franco-Siamese Treaties, which confirmed the existing frontiers, and in 1947 in Washington before the Franco-Siamese Conciliation Commission, Thailand was silent. The natural inference was that Thailand had accepted the frontier at Preah Vihear as it was drawn on the map, irrespective of its correspondence with the watershed line. "

Two of the dissenting judges expressly remarked on the lack of evidence of specific conduct by Thailand that somehow indicated Cambodian sovereignty. Judge Moreno Quintana noted that "[t]here has been no conclusive evidence showing any tacit recognition by Thailand of the alleged Cambodian sovereignty over the area in question. It is the facts, clear facts, which must be taken into account. Judge Wellington Koo wrote that "[i]n the present case I have examined the evidence and found no statement or declaration of any kind by Siam or Thailand which recognizes, or can be considered to recognize, Cambodia's title to sovereignty over the Temple area. As to conduct, far from implying any acceptance of the Annex I map, she has consistently indicated a belief on her part throughout the past decades that the area in question continues to belong to her own sovereignty."

However, recently revealed documents indicate that, as early as 1911, senior officials of the Siamese government were aware that the Annex I map showed Preah Vihear as being located within Cambodia. As a result of this discovery and the recollection of the person who had led the Siamese Delimitation Commission, local officials were instructed not to make any protest to the French authorities about French activities at the temple—something the government had been prepared to do if it believed the temple was in Siam.

Australian judge Sir Percy Spender wrote a scathing dissent for the minority on the court, however, pointing out that the French government had never mentioned Thai "acquiescence" or acceptance at any time, not even when Thailand stationed military observers at the temple in 1949. On the contrary, France always insisted that their map was correct and the temple was located on their side of the natural watershed. Thailand had modified its own maps, which in Spender's opinion was sufficient without having to protest to France. Spender said:

Whether the Mixed Commission did or did not delimit the Dangrek, the truth, in my opinion, is that the frontier line on that mountain range is today the line of the watershed.

The Court however has upheld a frontier line which is not the line of the watershed, one which in the critical area of the Temple is an entirely different one. This finds its justification in the application of the concepts of recognition or acquiescence. With profound respect for the Court, I am obliged to say that in my judgment, as a result of a misapplication of these concepts and an inadmissible extension of them, territory, the sovereignty in which, both by treaty and by the decision of the body appointed under treaty to determine the frontier line, is Thailand's, now becomes vested in Cambodia.

Thailand reacted angrily. It announced it would boycott meetings of the Southeast Asia Treaty Organization, with Thai officials saying this step was to protest a U.S. bias toward Cambodia in the dispute. As evidence, Thai officials cited Acheson's role as Cambodia's advocate; the U.S. government replied that Acheson was merely acting as a private attorney, engaged by Cambodia. Mass demonstrations were staged in Thailand, protesting the ruling. Thailand eventually backed down and agreed to turn the site over to Cambodia. Rather than lower the Thai national flag that had been flying at the temple, Thai soldiers dug up and removed the pole, with it still flying. The pole was erected at nearby Mor I Daeng cliff, where it is still in use. In January 1963, Cambodia formally took possession of the site in a ceremony attended by around 1,000 people, many of whom had made the arduous climb up the cliff from the Cambodian side. Prince Sihanouk, Cambodia's leader, walked up the cliff in less than an hour, then made offerings to Buddhist monks. He made a gesture of conciliation in the ceremony, announcing that all Thais would be able to visit the temple without visas, and that Thailand was free to keep any antiquities it may have taken away from the site.

=== Civil war ===
Civil war began in Cambodia in 1970; the temple's location high on top of a cliff meant it was readily defensible militarily. Soldiers loyal to the Lon Nol government in Phnom Penh continued to hold it long after the plain below fell to communist forces.

Even though the Khmer Rouge captured Phnom Penh in April 1975, Khmer National Armed Forces soldiers at Preah Vihear continued to hold out after the collapse of the Khmer Republic. The Khmer Rouge made several unsuccessful attempts to capture the temple, then finally succeeded on 22 May 1975 by shelling the cliff, scaling it, and routing the defenders, Thai officials reported at the time. The defenders simply stepped across the border and surrendered to Thai authorities.

Full-scale war began again in Cambodia in December 1978, when the Vietnamese army invaded to overthrow the Khmer Rouge. Khmer Rouge troops retreated to border areas. In January, the Vietnamese reportedly attacked Khmer Rouge troops holed up in the temple, but there were no reports of damage to it. Large numbers of Cambodian refugees entered Thailand after the invasion. Guerrilla warfare continued in Cambodia through the 1980s and well into the 1990s, hampering access to Preah Vihear. The temple opened briefly to the public in 1992, only to be re-occupied the following year by Khmer Rouge fighters. In December 1998, the temple was the scene of negotiations by which several hundred Khmer Rouge soldiers, said to be the last significant guerrilla force, agreed to surrender to the Phnom Penh government.

The temple opened again to visitors from the Thai side at the end of 1998; Cambodia completed the construction of a long-awaited access road up the cliff in 2003.

=== Expulsion of Cambodian refugees ===
External videos
- Q&A with James Taing on his documentary Ghost Mountain, about his father's experiences as a Cambodian refugee at Preah Vihear, C-SPAN

On 12 June 1979, the government of General Kriangsak Chomanan, who had come to power in Thailand by a military coup, informed foreign embassies in Bangkok that it was going to expel a large number of Cambodian refugees. He would allow the governments of the United States, France, and Australia to select 1,200 refugees to resettle in their countries. Lionel Rosenblatt, refugee coordinator of the American embassy, Yvette Pierpaoli, a French businesswoman in Bangkok, and representatives of the Australian and French governments rushed to the border to select the refugees that night. In three frantic hours, the foreigners picked out 1,200 refugees for resettlement from among the thousands being held by Thai soldiers behind barbed wire in the Buddhist temple of Wat Ko (Wat Chana Chaisri), in the town of Aranyaprathet, and loaded them on buses to go to Bangkok. The remaining refugees were then driven away, their destination unknown. It was later discovered that refugees had been collected from many locations and sent to Preah Vihear. An American embassy official stood beneath a tree along a dirt road leading to the temple, counted the buses, and estimated that about 42,000 Cambodians were taken to the temple.

Preah Vihear is situated at the top of a 2,000-foot high escarpment overlooking the Cambodian plains below. The refugees were unloaded from the buses and pushed down the steep escarpment. "There was no path to follow", one said. "The way that we had to go down was only a cliff. Some people hid on top of the mountain and survived. Others were shot or pushed over the cliff. Most of the people began to climb down using vines as ropes. They tied their children on their backs and strapped them across their chests. As the people climbed down, the soldiers threw big rocks over the cliff".

The United Nations High Commissioner for Refugees later estimated that as many as 3,000 Cambodians had died in the pushback and another 7,000 were unaccounted for. Kriangsak's apparent objective in this brutal operation was to demonstrate to the international community that his government would not bear alone the burden of hundreds of thousands of Cambodian refugees. If so, it worked. For the next dozen years, the UN and Western countries would pay for the upkeep of Cambodian refugees in Thailand, resettling thousands in other countries, and devising means by which Cambodians could return safely to their own country.

=== World Heritage Site ===
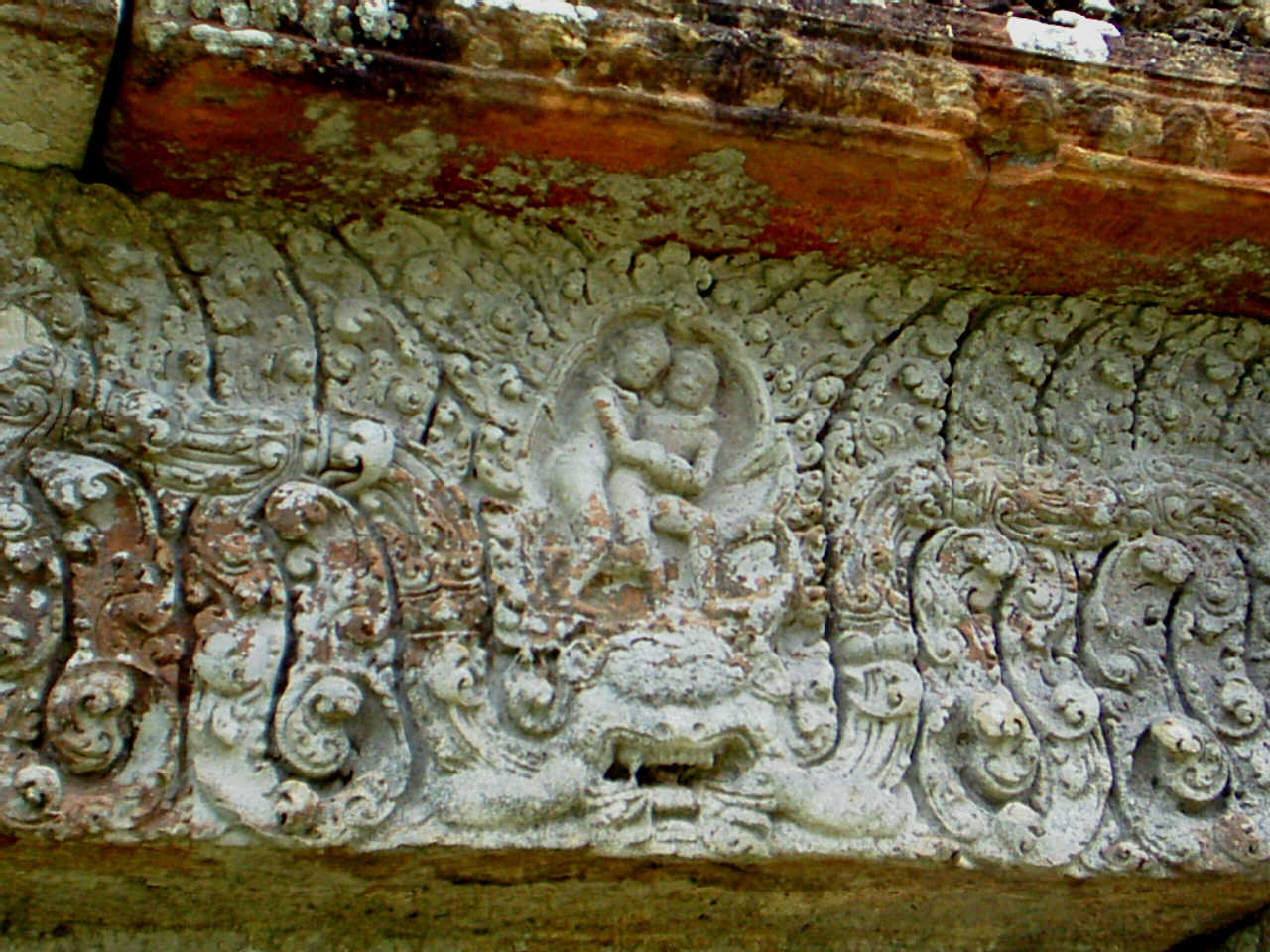
Lintel showing Shiva fighting Arjuna, gopura three

On 8 July 2008, the World Heritage Committee decided to add Prasat Preah Vihear, along with 26 other sites, to the World Heritage Site list, despite several protests from Thailand, since the map implied Cambodian ownership of disputed land next to the temple. As the process of heritage-listing began, Cambodia announced its intention to apply for World Heritage inscription by UNESCO. Thailand protested that it should be a joint effort, and UNESCO deferred debate at its 2007 meeting. Following this, both Cambodia and Thailand were in full agreement that Preah Vihear had "outstanding universal value" and should be inscribed on the World Heritage List as soon as possible. The two nations agreed that Cambodia should propose the site for formal inscription at the 32nd session of the World Heritage Committee in 2008, with the active support of Thailand. This led to a redrawing of the map of the area for proposed inscription, leaving only the temple and its immediate environs. However, Thailand's political opposition launched an attack on this revised plan (see Modern History and Ownership Dispute), claiming the inclusion of Preah Vihear could nevertheless "consume" the overlapping disputed area near the temple. In response to political pressure at home, the Thai government withdrew its formal support for the listing of Preah Vihear as a World Heritage site. Cambodia continued with the application, and, despite official Thai protests, succeeded on 7 July 2008.

=== Disputes over ownership since 2008 ===
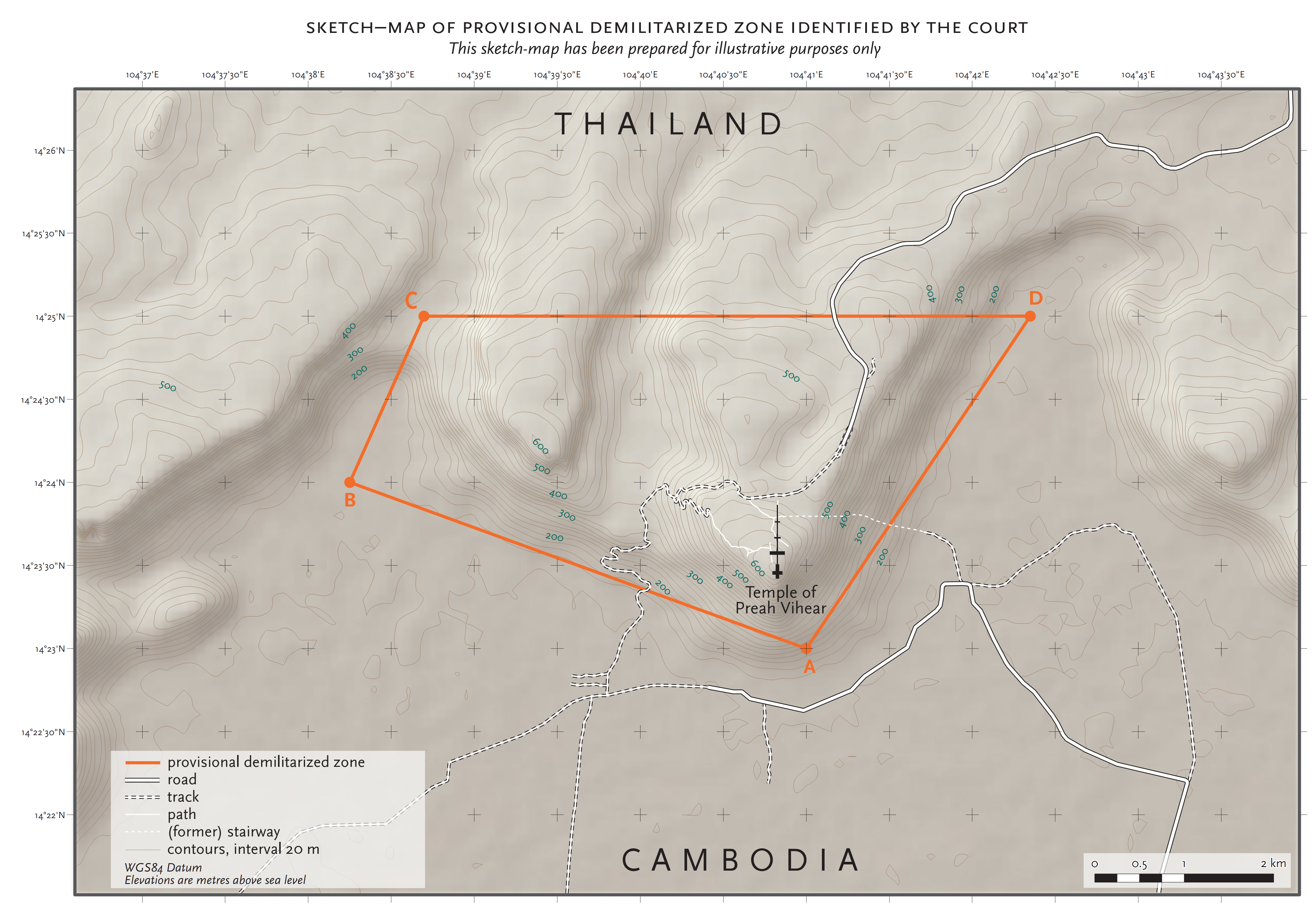
Provisional demilitarized zone around the temple, as ruled by the ICJ in 2011.

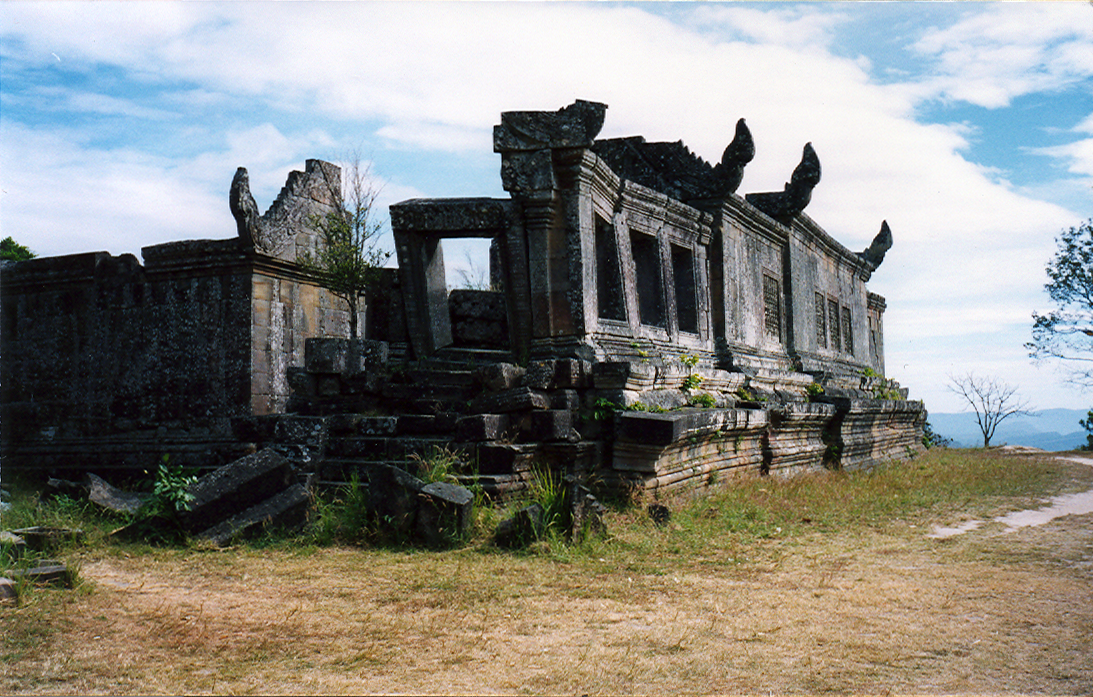
Temple structures in 2003

The conflict between Cambodia and Thailand over land adjoining the site has led to periodic outbreaks of violence. One such military clash occurred in October 2008. In April 2009, 66 stones at the temple were allegedly damaged by Thai soldiers firing across the border. In February 2010, the Cambodian government filed a formal letter of complaint with Google Maps for depicting the natural watershed as the international border instead of the line shown on the 1907 French map used by the International Court of Justice in 1962.

In February 2011, when Thai officials were in Cambodia negotiating the dispute, Thai and Cambodian troops clashed, resulting in injuries and deaths on both sides. Artillery bombardment in the area occurred during the conflict. The Cambodian government has claimed that damage occurred to the temple. However, a UNESCO mission to the site to determine the extent of the damage indicated that the destruction was a result of both Cambodian and Thai gunfire. Starting on 4 February 2011, both sides used artillery against each other, and both blamed the other for initiating the violence. On 5 February, in a formal letter to the U.N., Cambodia complained that "The recent Thai military actions violate the 1991 Paris Peace Accord, U.N. Charter and a 1962 judgment from the International Court of Justice". On 6 February, the Cambodian government claimed that the temple had been damaged. Cambodia's military commander said: "A wing of our Preah Vihear temple has collapsed as a direct result of the Thai artillery bombardment". However, Thai sources spoke only of minor damage, claiming that Cambodian soldiers had fired from within the temple. ASEAN, to which both states belong, offered to mediate the issue. However, Thailand insisted that bilateral discussions could better solve the issue. On 5 February, the right-wing People's Alliance for Democracy called for the resignation of Prime Minister Abhisit Vejjajiva for "failing to defend the nation's sovereignty".

A UNESCO World Heritage convention held in Paris in June 2011 agreed to accept Cambodia's management proposal for the temple. As a consequence, Thailand withdrew from the event, with the Thai representative explaining, "We withdraw to say we do not accept any decision from this meeting". Following a February 2011 request from Cambodia for Thai military forces to be ordered out of the area, judges at the ICJ, by a vote of 11–5, ordered that both countries immediately withdraw their military forces and further imposed restrictions on their police forces. The court said this order would not prejudice any final ruling on where the border in the area between Thailand and Cambodia should fall. Abhisit Vejjajiva said that Thai soldiers would not pull out from the disputed area until the military of both countries agree on the mutual withdrawal. "[I]t depends on the two sides to come together and talk", he said, suggesting that an existing joint border committee would be the appropriate place to plan a coordinated pullback. The ICJ ruled on 11 November 2013 that the land adjacent to the temple on the east and west (south being previously agreed as Cambodian, north as Thai) belongs to Cambodia, and that any Thai security forces still in that area should leave.

=== 2025 Cambodia-Thailand border conflict ===
During the 2025 Cambodia–Thailand border conflict, the Cambodian Ministry of Culture and Fine Arts said the temple suffered substantial damage from Thai attacks, with 562 sections of the complex affected. In response, the Thai government has said that it was targeting Cambodian military assets within the temple.

== Architecture ==
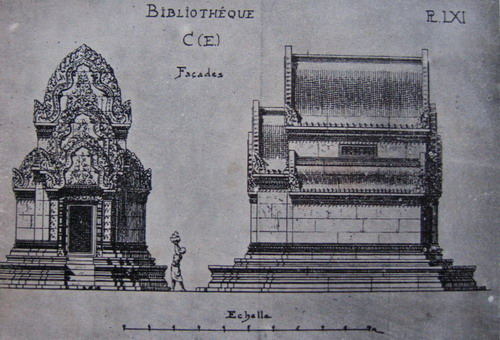
Illustration of temple structures

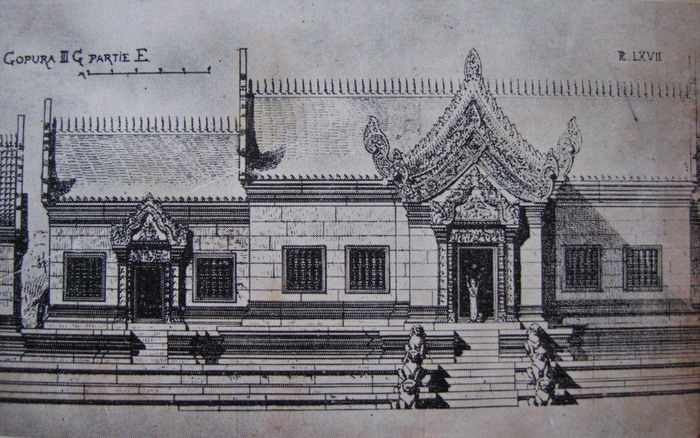
Drawing of temple structures

=== Plan at a glance ===
Large stairways and a long pillared causeway lead to the gopura of the first three levels of the mountain. There are nāga balustrades between the third, fourth, and the top level. There, the galleries and colonnades define areas for religious ceremonies and rituals performed in and around the main shrine containing the linga.

=== Materials ===
The gray and yellow sandstone used for the construction of Preah Vihear was available locally. Wood was used extensively to construct a support for the roof, which was covered in terracotta tiles. Bricks, despite their small size, were used instead of large rock slabs to construct the corbel arches. Bricks were easier to use when building corbelled roofs, as they bound together with mortar and were more compact and solid than stone slabs. The sandstone blocks used for the construction of the main tower are exceptionally large, weighing no less than five tons. Several include holes used for lifting.

==== Inscription ====
Several inscriptions have been found at Preah Vihear, the most interesting of which are summarised here.

- K.383: known as the Stele of Preah Vihear, or Stele of the Divakara, this inscription was written in Sanskrit and Khmer, probably between 1119 and 1121 CE. It narrates, by order of Suryavarman II, the life of the royal guru Divakara and how he served under five Khmer kings (Udayadiyavarman II, Harshavarman III, Jayavarman VI, Dharanindravarman I, and Suryaman II), who entrusted him with many gifts, both for himself and to be donated on their behalf to temples. Between the first and second decade of the 12th century, Divakara was asked by Suryavarman II to go on a pilgrimage to the temples to offer gifts, preside over ritual sacrifices, and carry out improvements and repair works. At Preah Vihear, Divakara offered precious objects to Shikhareshvara (the main god of the temple), such as a statue, probably of gold, of the dancing Shiva. He added a gold dais inlaid with precious stones, covered the temple floor with bronze plaques, and decorated the walls with plates of precious metal. He ordered that the towers, courts, and main entrance be redecorated annually. He also distributed payments to all those who worked at the temple. This inscription is engraved on a stele found inside the mandapa.
- K.380: this inscription appears on both sides of the southern door on the gopura of the fourth level. Written in Sanskrit and Khmer, probably between 1038 and 1049, it contains important history about Preah Vihear. It narrates the story of a local personage, Sukarman, who carried out the duties of recorder in the sanctuary and keeper of archives of the kingdom. It also tells of a royal decree requiring certain people to swear an oath of allegiance to Shikhareshvara.
- K.381: this inscription was sculpted on the southern doorjamb of the eastern palace's portico, on the third level. Written in Sanskrit and Khmer during 1024, it narrates the story of Tapasvindra-pandita, head of a hermitage, who was asked to dispose of presentation in favour of Shikhareshvara.
- K.382: this inscription was carved on a pillar and was found badly damaged in front of the central sanctuary and later taken to the Bangkok National Museum. Inscribed in 1047, it refers to Suryavarman I, who commissioned the inscription, but contains little information that is important to Preah Vihear.

==== Mountain stairway ====
When visitors pass the modern entrance gate, they are faced with a steep stairway consisting of 163 steps made of large stone slabs, many of which are cut directly into the rock surface. The stairway is 8 meters wide and 78.5 meters long. It was originally flanked by rows of lion statues, of which only a few remain, close to the modern entrance gate. In its last 27 meters, the stairway narrows to a width of only 4 meters and is flanked by seven small terraces on either side, which were once decorated with the lion statues. The difficulty of climbing the stairway symbolises the laborious path of faith needed to approach the sacred world of the gods.

==== Lion head reservoir ====
Between Gopura IV and III, some 50 meters to the east of the second pillared avenue, there is a square, stone-paved reservoir, 9.4 meters on each side. Each side of the reservoir has 12 steps, each 20 to 25 centimeters high. Near this small reservoir, there is a redented, square brick base 6 meters on each side. It is supposed that this was used as the pedestal for a statue or a small construction made in perishable materials, suggesting a ritual use of this small reservoir. According to previous reports, on the southern side of this pool there was a stone lion's head with a water outlet from its mouth. It was visible only when the water level of the reservoir was very low. This lion spout is no longer at the site, and its whereabouts are unknown.

== Gallery ==
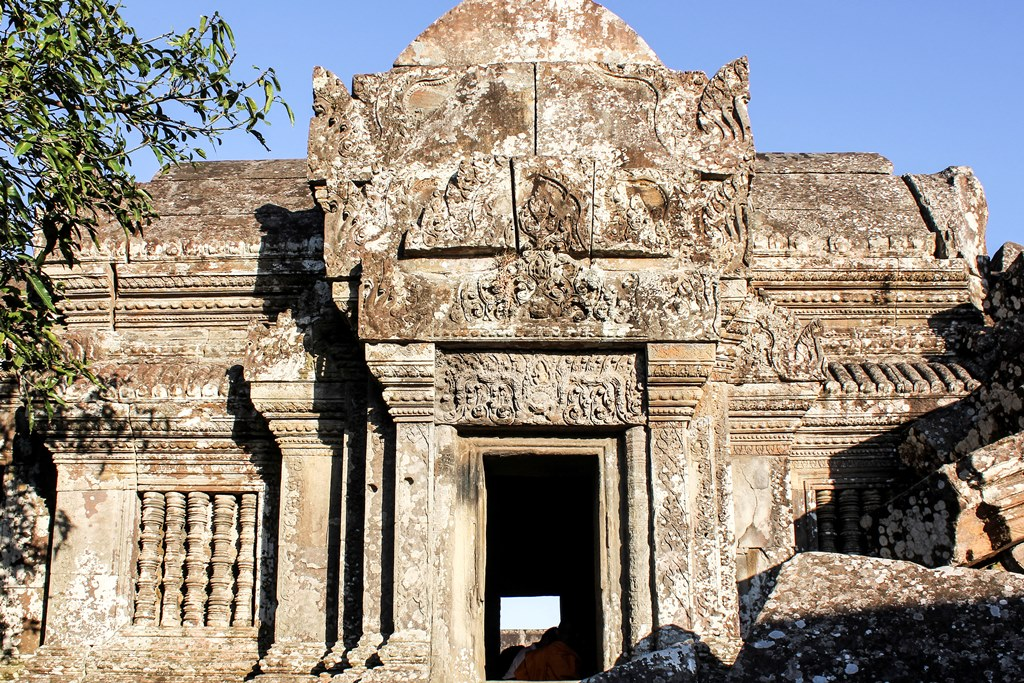

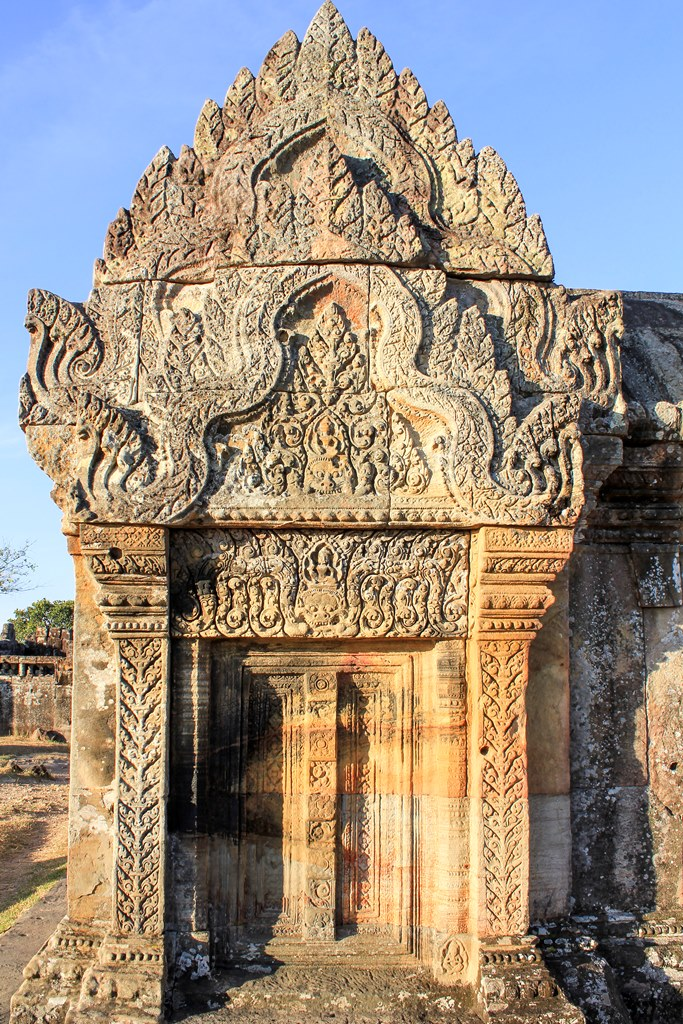

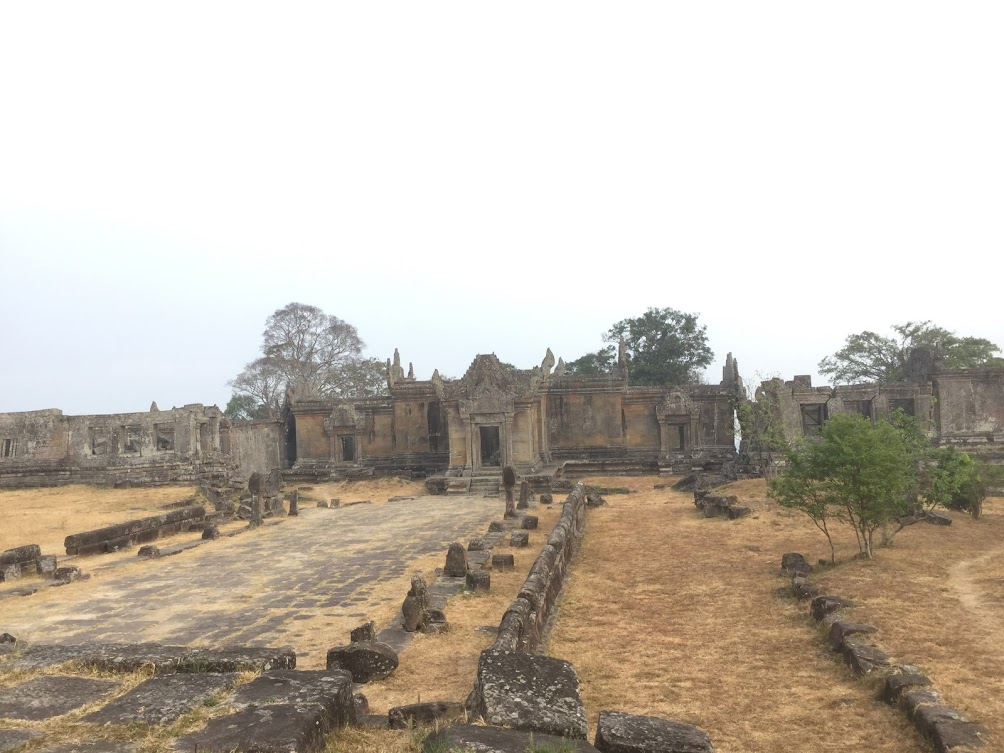

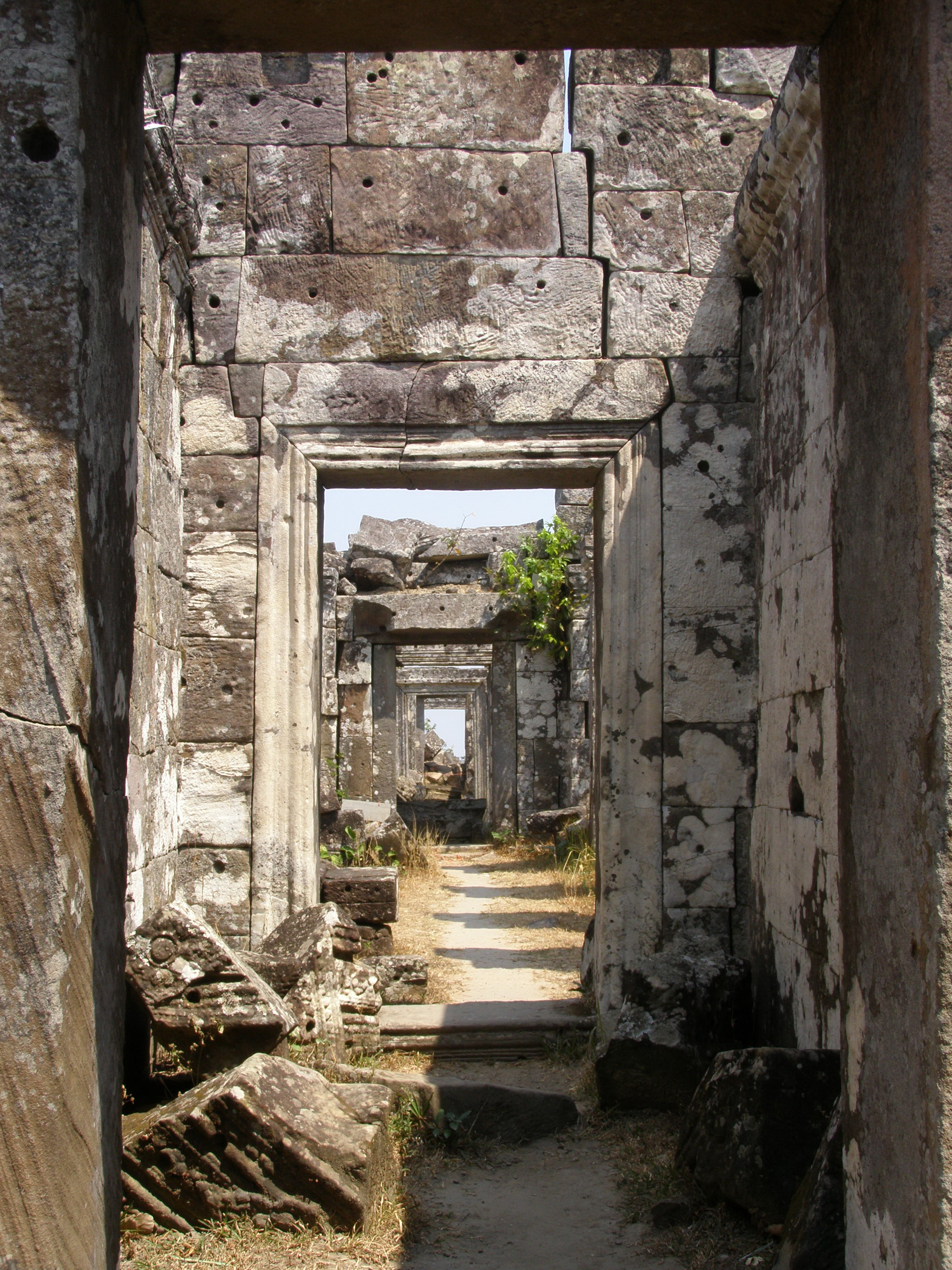

== See also ==
- List of World Heritage Sites in Cambodia
- Cambodian–Thai border stand-off

== Sources ==
- Coe, Michael D. (2003). Angkor and the Khmer Civilization. Thames & Hudson. ISBN 0-500-28442-3.
- Higham, Charles (2001). The Civilization of Angkor. University of California Press. ISBN 0-520-23442-1.
- Thompson, Larry Clinton (2010). Refugee Workers in the Indochina Exodus, 1975–1982. McFarland & Co. ISBN 0-7864-4529-7
- Missling, Sven. "A Legal View of the Case of the Temple Preah Vihear". In: World Heritage Angkor and Beyond: Circumstances and Implications of UNESCO Listings in Cambodia [online]. Göttingen: Göttingen University Press, 2011 (generated 23 May 2020). Available on the Internet: World Heritage Angkor and Beyond: Circumstances and Implications of UNESCO Listings in Cambodia.
- Bruno Bruguier, Juliette Lacroix (2013). Preah Khan, Koh Ker et Preah Vihear. Les provinces occidentales. Guide archéologique du Cambodge, Tome 5. JSRC. ISBN 9789996361203.
