= Refugees International =

Non-governmental organization

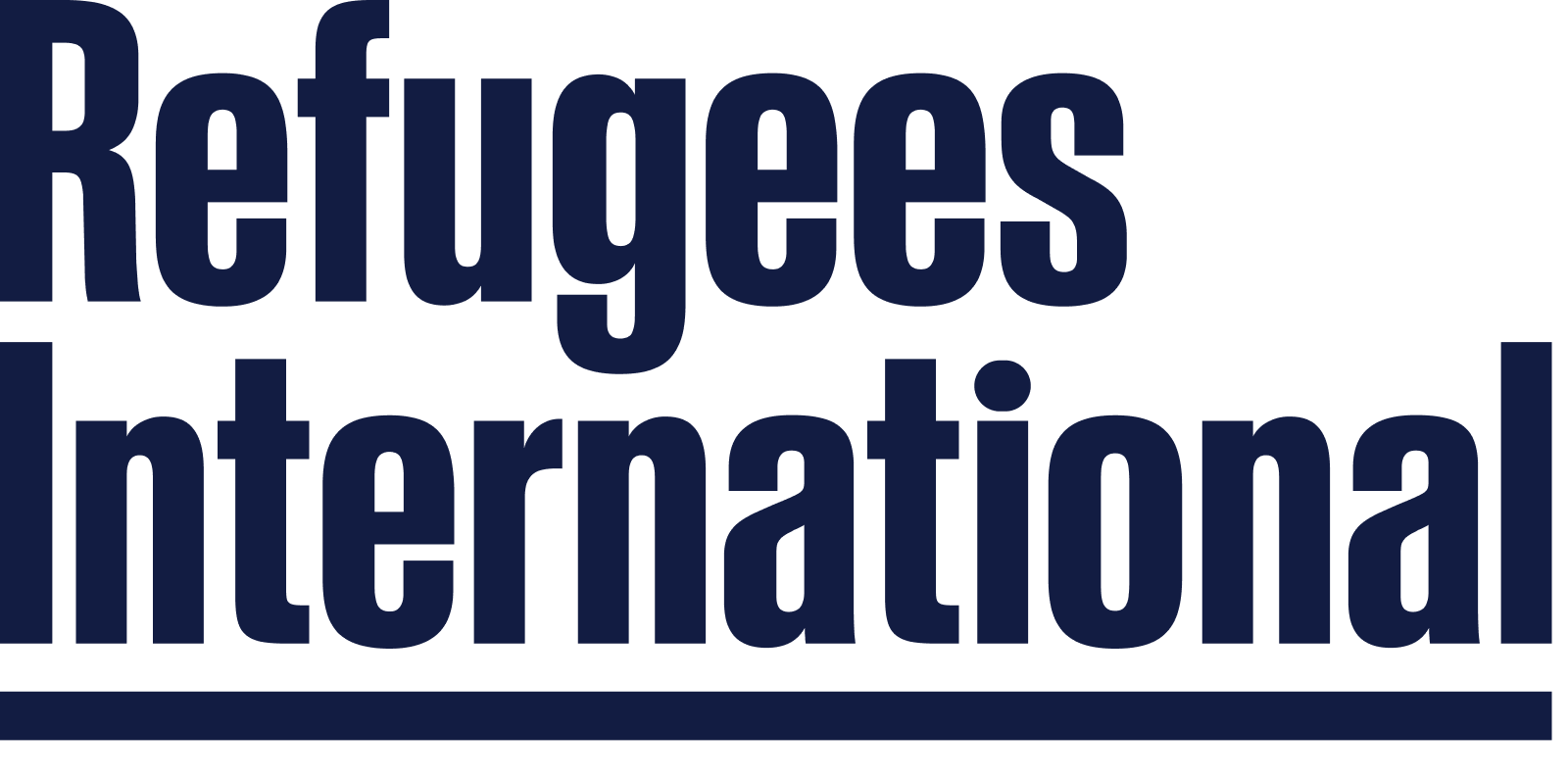
- Founded: 1979
- Type: Non-profit; NGO
- Location(s): Washington, D.C., and New York City
- Region served: Central African Republic, Democratic Republic of Congo, Mali, Myanmar, Somalia, South Sudan, Syria
- Fields: Advocacy, humanitarian affairs, human rights, research (conducted through field missions to locations refugees crises and areas of displacement)
- Key people: Jeremy Konyndyk, President
- Website: www.refugeesinternational.org

Refugees International (RI) is a humanitarian organization that advocates for lifesaving assistance, human rights, and protection for displaced people and promotes solutions to displacement crises. It does not accept United Nations or government funding.

== History ==
Refugees International was founded by Sue Morton in 1979 as a citizens' movement to protect Indochinese refugees. Morton resided in Tokyo and Singapore in the first year of Refugees International. In Washington, D.C., the founding Director of Refugees International was Dianne L. Lawson, who incorporated Refugees International in the U.S. (Washington, D.C.), and oversaw the first public actions taken by Refugees International, a full-page ad in The Washington Post, on July 19, 1979, in which Refugees International requested that the Executive and Legislative Branches of the U.S. Government act to rescue Vietnamese and Cambodians (Kampucheans) at sea. On the date the ad appeared in The Washington Post, Morton and Lawson were part of a march, led by then Senator Paul Simon (D-IL) and the singer Joan Baez, from the Lincoln Memorial to the north side of the White House. At the end of that march, the crowd sang "Amazing Grace" and, to the crowd's surprise, President Jimmy Carter strode out from the doors of the White House and announced that he had just ordered the U.S. 7th Fleet to pick up all refugees on boats who were fleeing from Southeast Asia.

Refugees International, powered by only volunteers at its beginning, hired paid staff and expanded its scope beyond Southeast Asia in 1990, advocating for protection for Liberian refugees in Guinea and Kuwaitis in the Iraq-Jordan desert. It now conducts field missions to identify displaced people's needs for basic services such as food, water, health care, housing, access to education and protection from harm. Based on their findings during humanitarian emergencies, the organization appeals to policy makers and aid agencies and promotes the strategic benefits of United States foreign aid. The organization is currently focused on displacement crises in and around Colombia, Democratic Republic of Congo, Mali, Myanmar, Somalia, South Sudan, and Syria.

== Independence ==
Refugees International does not accept government or UN funding, allowing their advocates to be independent. RI leverages donations from individuals, foundations, and corporations.

== Leadership ==
- Jeremy Konyndyk, current president; previously served in the Biden administration as USAID's lead official on COVID-19 and in the Obama administration as the director of the Office of U.S. Foreign Disaster Assistance at USAID.
- Eric P. Schwartz, president from June 2017 until February 2022; previously served as United States Assistant Secretary of State for Population, Refugees, and Migration.
- Michel Gabaudan, president from September 2010 until June 2017; previously served in the Office of the United Nations High Commissioner for Refugees as the Regional Representative for the United States and the Caribbean and now is the UNHCR's Regional Representative for Western Europe.
- Dan Glickman, was president for only three months, from April 1, 2010, until June 2010, when he resigned; former United States Secretary of Agriculture, U.S. Representative, Chairman/CEO of the Motion Picture Association of America.
- Kenneth Bacon, became president in 2001 and led the organization until he died in August 2009.
- Yvette Pierpaoli, European representative, 1992-1999; killed in automobile accident in Albania in 1999.
- Lionel Rosenblatt, former Coordinator of Refugee Affairs at the U.S. Embassy in Bangkok, Thailand. Served as President 1990-2001 and President emeritus thereafter.

George Soros, Richard Holbrooke and Sam Waterston are former board members.
