= St. Peters Mumias Boys Primary =

Kenyan primary school

St. Peters Mumias Boys Primary, also known as "Mumias Boys", is a Kenyan primary school in the Kakamega County in the former Western Province of Kenya. It was established by the Mill Hill Fathers Missionaries in 1929. It is among the many other schools falling within the Roman Catholic Diocese of Kakamega.

== Academic Rivalry ==
St. Peters Mumias boys notably competes fiercely with other high flying schools within the District such as Booker Academy (a school run by the Mumias Sugar company), St. Anne's Girls Primary and Mumias Central primary school which also menially benefits financially from the sugar Company. In the Kenyan national examination, the Top results normally see-saws between this schools nationally.

== co curriculum activates ==
In 1996 under the stewardship of Mr Owandati the school became the first primary school from western to bag the coveted drama festivals title.

== 1998 national Examination cancellation ==
In 1998, the final examinations of about 2/3 of all the students who sat for the national examination K.C.P.E, had their results canceled due to reports and allegations of rampant cheating and dishonesty. this fact did tarnish the name of an otherwise close to perfect academic giant in Western Province.
