= Lionel Rosenblatt =

American diplomat (1943–2026)

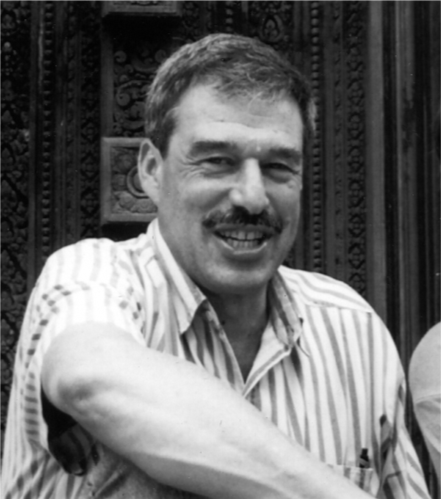
- Rosenblatt in Cambodia, 1998
- Born: December 10, 1943; New York City, U.S.
- Died: April 11, 2026 (aged 82); Washington, D.C., U.S.
- Occupations: Diplomat; refugee advocate
- Spouse: Ann Grosvenor (m. 1971)

Lionel Alexander Rosenblatt (December 10, 1943 – April 11, 2026) was an American diplomat who was refugee coordinator at the United States Embassy in Thailand, and president of Refugees International, an advocacy organization for refugees. Rosenblatt was one of the foremost advocates for resettling Indochinese refugees in the United States during the 1970s and 1980s.

== Early life and education ==
Rosenblatt was born in Manhattan on December 10, 1943, the son of David B. and Carol Blumenthal Rosenblatt. His father was a nuclear scientist who worked at Brookhaven National Laboratory. Rosenblatt graduated from Harvard College and attended Stanford Law School for a year before joining the Foreign Service of the Department of State. In the 1960s and early 1970s he was stationed in Vietnam, Sri Lanka, and Thailand. He married Ann Grosvenor in April 1971.

== Fall of Saigon ==
In early 1975, Rosenblatt was one of a small group of officers at the State Department who pushed for the evacuation of significant numbers of Vietnamese associated with the U.S. war effort in South Vietnam. With the North Vietnamese army advancing to capture Saigon, Rosenblatt and fellow diplomat L. Craig Johnstone were concerned about the slow place of evacuating Vietnamese who had worked for or with the United States in South Vietnam. In April, defying State Department orders, they flew to Saigon and arranged for the evacuation of 200 Vietnamese friends and colleagues.

Returning to Washington, Rosenblatt and Johnstone were called to the office of Secretary of State Henry Kissinger who sternly rebuked them for their unauthorized visit to Saigon, then smiled, shook their hands, and offered them their choice of jobs in the Department of State. Rosenblatt chose to continue working with refugees.

== Refugee Coordinator ==
From 1976 to 1981, Rosenblatt spent most of his time in Bangkok, Thailand, as the Refugee Coordinator of the U.S. Embassy. Working under the leadership of Shepard C. Lowman at the State Department, Rosenblatt presided over a large organization that processed hundreds of thousands of Vietnamese, Laotian, and Cambodian refugees for entry into the United States and protected and provided aid to hundreds of thousands more who resided in refugee camps scattered all over Southeast Asia. He retired early from the Foreign Service in 1988.

== Refugees International ==
In 1990, Rosenblatt became President of Refugees International, a Washington-based advocacy organization, and served in that position until 2001. With colleagues such as Yvette Pierpaoli, he traveled to humanitarian crisis areas worldwide, advocating assistance to refugees and durable solutions to humanitarian problems.

In 1995, Rosenblatt traveled to Chechnya in a fruitless search for the missing humanitarian Fred Cuny. Cuny's body was never found.

== Death ==
Rosenblatt died of leukemia in Washington, D.C., on April 11, 2026, at the age of 82.

== Awards and honors ==
In 1975, Rosenblatt received the William R. Rivkin award from the American Foreign Service Association for his work rescuing Vietnamese refugees.

In 1981, Rosenblatt was conferred the title of Commander of the Most Exalted Order of the White Elephant by the Royal Government of Thailand for his refugee work.

In 1982–1983, Rosenblatt was selected for a sabbatical leave by the Una Chapman Cox Foundation. He devoted his sabbatical to assisting Indochinese refugees.

The 1990 made-for-television movie Last Flight Out had a character named Larry Rose based on Rosenblatt. The movie dramatized Rosenblatt's visit to Saigon in April 1975.

In 2009, Rosenblatt received the Julia Taft Award for "outstanding contributions to the humanitarian and development community".

In 2010, Rosenblatt was declared an Honorary Doctor of Humane Letters by Concordia University. The award recognized his work with the indigenous people of Southeastern Asia, especially Hmong refugees in Thailand.

Rosenblatt was a member of the Council on Foreign Relations.

== Publications ==
- Rosenblatt, Lionel A. and Thompson, Larry (1995), "Humanitarian Emergencies: Ten Steps to Save Lives and Resources," SAIS Review, Vol. 15, No. 2, p. 91–109.
- Rosenblatt, Lionel and Thompson, Larry (1998), "The Door of Opportunity: Creating a Permanent Peacekeeping Force," World Policy Journal, Vol. 15, No. 1, pp. 36–42.
