= Yvette Pierpaoli =

French humanitarian

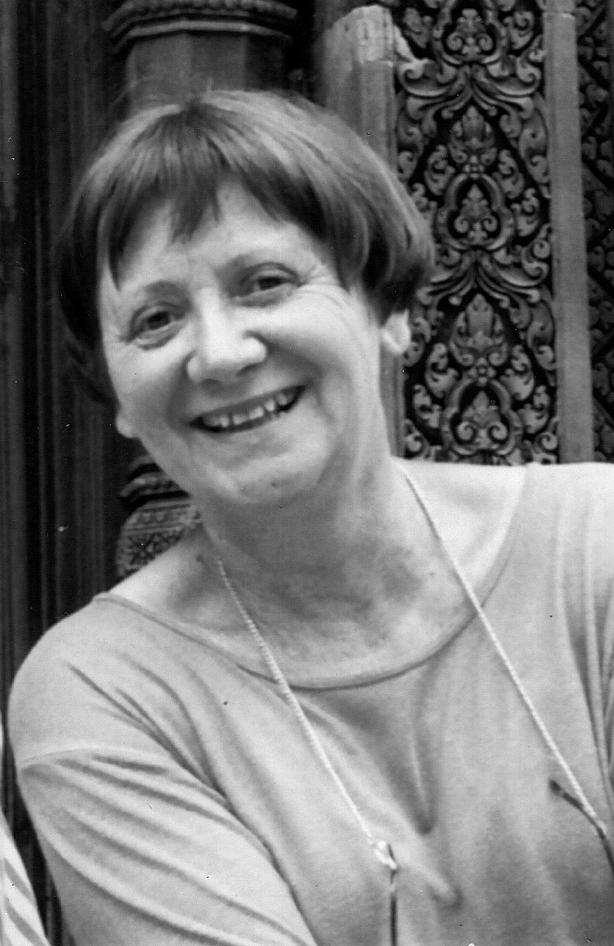
Yvette Pierpaoli at Angkor Wat, Cambodia in February 1998.

Yvette Pierpaoli (18 March 1938 – 18 April 1999) was a French humanitarian who lived in Cambodia and worked in many countries around the world. John le Carré dedicated his novel The Constant Gardener to her.

== Early life ==
Pierpaoli was born in Le Ban-Saint-Martin, the fifth child of an Italian father and a French mother. She first became interested in the Far East during a geography lesson about Indochina. Her turbulent character manifested itself in an aggressive attitude towards her family and classmates, earning her the nickname "the pest". After leaving school at the age of fifteen, Pierpaoli found a job as an office clerk. During that time she became interested in amateur radio communication and was one of the first French amateur radio operators. In 1958, after a confrontation with her father, she left the family home and went to Paris.

== Indochinese refugees ==
Pierpaoli came into contact with the Asian community in Paris. After a love affair with a Kampuchean medical student, she became pregnant and had a daughter. In 1967, aged 29, she traveled to Cambodia with her baby daughter. In Phnom Penh she proved to be an excellent businesswoman, selling small planes, tractors and chemicals and trading in rice. By 1974, a large number of refugees were pouring into Phnom Penh, fleeing the advance of the Khmer Rouge. Moved by their plight, Pierpaoli devoted much of her time to helping refugee children, adopting one of them and supporting many others. She became head of Continental Air Services, Inc in Cambodia, which flew regularly between Phnom Penh and Bangkok on behalf of the U.S. Embassy and other organizations. She was described by a journalist as "an adventurer with a big heart, works for the CIA." Pierpaoli denied working for the CIA, although the CIA was a source of funding for Continental.

In 1974, Pierpaoli met author John le Carré in Phnom Penh. He described her as a "small, sparky, tough, brown-eyed provincial Frenchwoman" with "an absolutely non-negotiable, visceral requirement...to get food and money to the starving, medicines to the sick, shelter for the homeless, paper for the stateless...This did not in any way prevent her from being a resourceful and frequently shameless businesswoman, particularly when she was pitched against people whose cash, in her unshakable opinion, would be better in the pockets of the needy."

As Phnom Penh came under siege by the Khmer Rouge, Pierpaoli moved to Bangkok. After the Khmer Rouge victory in April 1975, she began visiting refugee camps on the border of Thailand to help Cambodians who fled their country and sought refuge in Thailand. Plying the border with a small car, she brought them food and medicine and took into her house in Bangkok as many as she could help escape. In 1979, the Thai government forcibly repatriated thousands of Cambodian refugees. Pierpaoli, along with American Lionel Rosenblatt, rescued as many refugees as possible before they were forced across the border, especially at Preah Vihear, where 40,000 Cambodians were pushed off a cliff into a minefield. Thousands died as they attempted to cross the minefield.

== Refugees International ==
In 1985, Pierpaoli left her business and returned to France, settling near Uzès. She met a young monk from Guatemala, who described the plight of his country, just emerging from civil war. She founded a charity, collected money and went to Zaculeu, a village in Guatemala. Joined by several volunteers, she undertook to rebuild the houses, to dig wells and to return the land to cultivation, demonstrating that "a single person can sometimes achieve what large organizations cannot....I realized what made me different from others in how I conceptualized humanitarian work. They assumed that a project had to have ideas, personnel, and materials, and funds, all the elements of a project, first. In my mind, things happened in the opposite way....The idea of having to decide in advance how things were going to happen in order to arrive at a fixed objective seemed unnatural to me."

Pierpaoli published her autobiography Woman of a Thousand Children in 1992 and became the European Representative of Refugees International (RI) the same year. During the 1990s, along with colleagues RI President Rosenblatt and Advocacy Director Larry Clinton Thompson, she undertook missions to humanitarian disaster areas in Mali, Niger, Bangladesh, Albania, and Southeast Asia. On April 18, 1999, while on a mission to assist refugees from Kosovo, she was one of four people killed in an automobile accident while traveling from Tirana to Kukës, Albania.
